= Revelation 17 =

- ← chapter 16 chapter 18 →
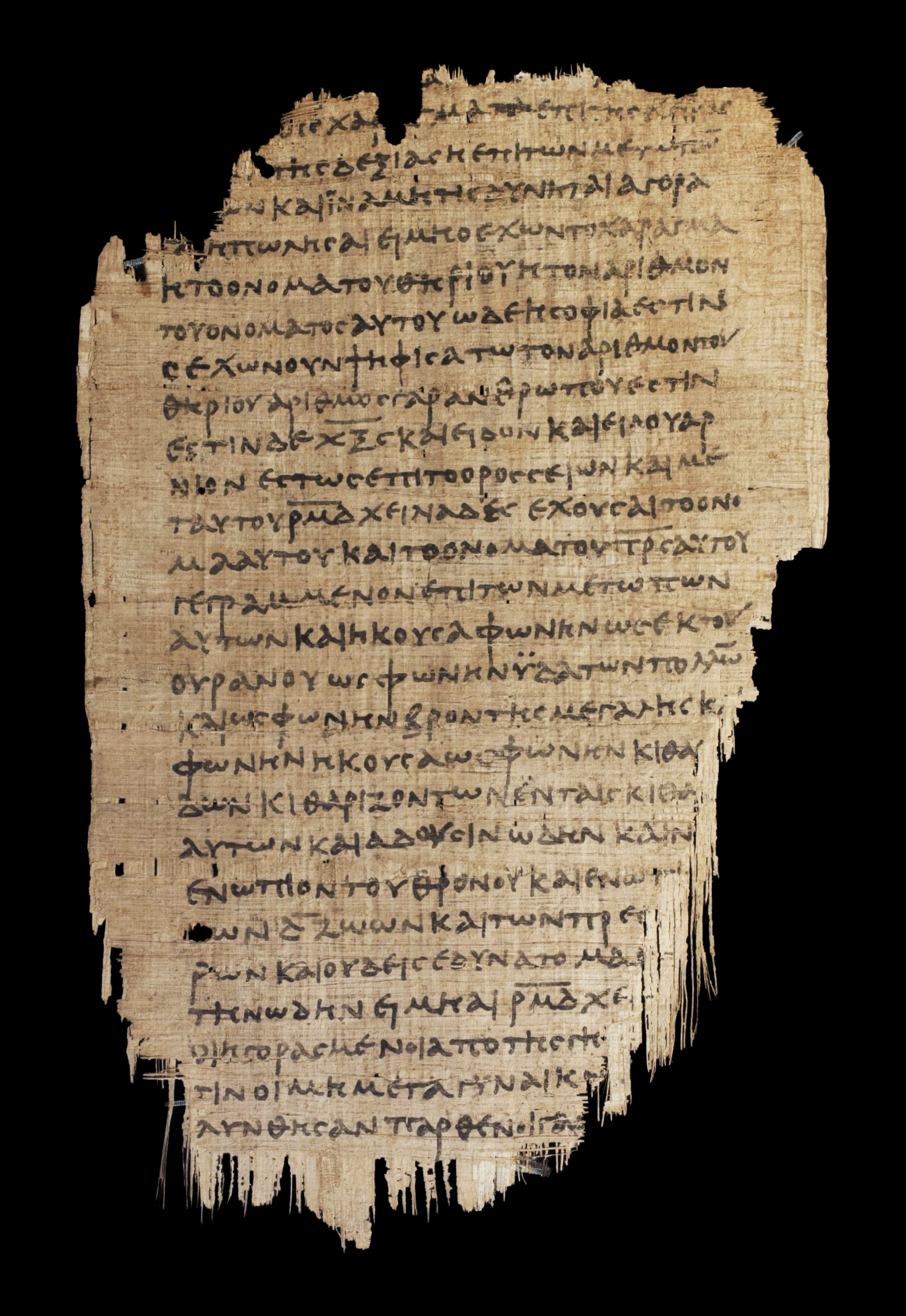
- Revelation 13:16-14:4 on Papyrus 47 from the third century.
- Book: Book of Revelation
- Category: Apocalypse
- Christian Bible part: New Testament
- Order in the Christian part: 27

Revelation 17 is the seventeenth chapter of the Book of Revelation or the Apocalypse to John in the New Testament of the Christian Bible. The book is traditionally attributed to John the Apostle, but the identity of the author remains a point of academic debate. This chapter describes the judgment of the Whore of Babylon ("Babylon the Harlot").

== Text ==
The original text was written in Koine Greek. This chapter is divided into 18 verses.

=== Textual witnesses ===
Some early manuscripts containing the text of this chapter are among others: (Note: The Book of Revelation is missing from Codex Vaticanus.)

- Papyrus 47 (3rd century; extant verses 1-2)
- Codex Sinaiticus (330-360)
- Codex Alexandrinus (400-440)

=== New Testament references ===
- Revelation 17:14: 1 Timothy 6:15 (and also Revelation 19:16)

== The vision of the harlot (17:1–6a) ==
After being mentioned only briefly in Revelation 14:8 and 16:19, Babylon is given a full description in this section.

=== Verse 1 ===
Then one of the seven angels who had the seven bowls came and talked with me, saying [to me], “Come, I will show you the judgment of the great harlot who sits on many waters,"

- "One of the seven angels": provides a characteristic literary link to the previous chapter. German theologian Johann Gottfried Eichhorn suggested that the first of the seven angels with the seven bowls is intended: Biblical Greek: εἱς is equivalent to Biblical Greek: πρῶτος. Heinrich Meyer disagrees: "It is in no way to be conjectured which of the vial-angels it was".

The words "to me" do not appear in Codex Alexandrinus or in the Vulgate translation.

=== Verse 2 ===
with whom the kings of the earth committed fornication, and the inhabitants of the earth were made drunk with the wine of her fornication.”

Lutheran Pietist theologian Johann Bengel notes a parallel with Tyre, which "committed fornication with the kingdoms of the earth" in Isaiah 23:17–18.

=== Verse 5 ===
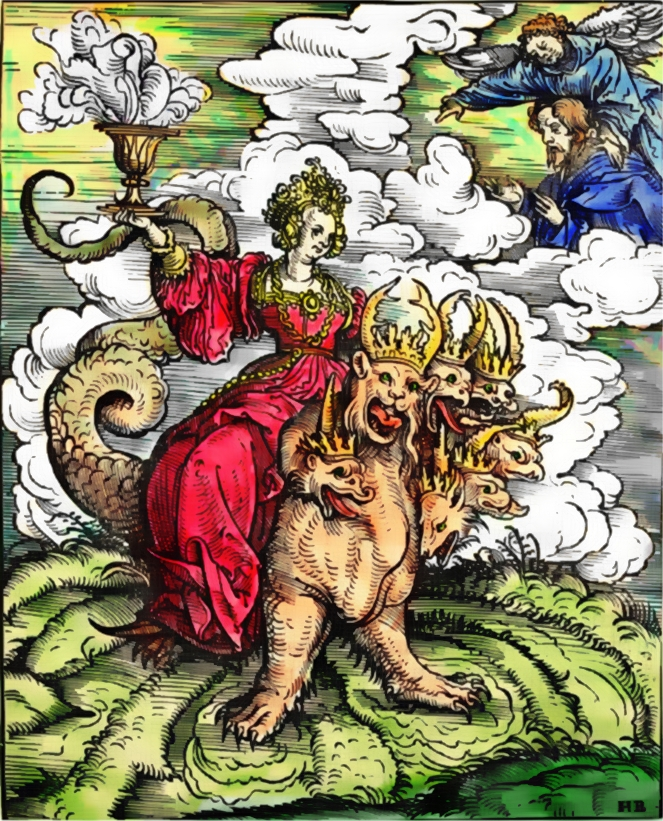
A 1523 woodcut by Hans Burgkmair, for Martin Luther's translation of the New Testament, depicting the Whore of Babylon riding the seven-headed Beast (a hand-coloured copy)

And on her forehead a name was written:

MYSTERY, BABYLON THE GREAT,
THE MOTHER OF HARLOTS
AND OF THE ABOMINATIONS
OF THE EARTH.

The King James Version, New King James Version, and Young's Literal Translation (1862) include the word 'mystery' (or 'secret' - YLT) within her title, but in many other English translations the word is descriptive of the name: "a name of mystery" (Revised Standard Version, English Standard Version), "a name that has a secret meaning" (Good News Bible).

=== Verse 6 ===
I saw the woman, drunk with the blood of the saints and with the blood of the martyrs of Jesus.
And when I saw her, I marveled with great amazement.

This verse contains two descriptions of Christians which seem to refer to the same group (not two groups) of people.

== The interpretation of the harlot (17:6b–18) ==
In response to John's astonishment at the vision of the harlot, an interpretation is given as much about the beast as about the harlot, because 'her fate is closely related to the career of the beast'.

=== Verse 6 ===
I could see that she was drunk—drunk with the blood of the martyrs of Jesus she had killed. I stared at her in horror.

=== Verse 7 ===
Then the angel said to me, “Why are you astonished? I will explain to you the mystery of the woman and of the beast, with the seven heads and the ten horns, that carries her.

=== Verse 8 ===
The beast, which you saw, was, and is not, and is to ascend out of the bottomless pit and go to destruction. Those who dwell on the earth whose names are not written in the Book of Life from the foundation of the world will marvel when they see the beast that was, and is not, and is to come.

Whereas one of Revelation's key designations for God is the term 'the one who was and who is and who is to come' (1:4, 8), in this verse the beast is twice described in a similar term, but with the significant different in the middle which is negative: 'is not', because unlike God, the beast is not eternal and his second coming "will prove a fraud" and "go to destruction".

=== Verse 9 ===
Here is the mind which has wisdom: The seven heads are seven mountains on which the woman sits.

- "Seven mountains": The definition of the mountains with the seven heads makes an unequivocal identification with Rome, 'which is famous for its seven hills'.

=== Verse 10 ===
There are also seven kings. Five have fallen, one is, and the other has not yet come. And when he comes, he must continue a short time.

- "Seven kings": is better to be recognized as the number of completeness, because the attempts to use this passage to identify the ruling Roman emperor when the Book of Revelation was written fail due to the impossibility to know 'from which emperor the counting should begin or whether all emperors should be counted'. It represents 'the complete sequence of kings', but not yet quite at the end because there is 'one short reign' still to come.
- "A short time": or "a little while": is 'the conventional period of eschatological imminence' (cf. 6:11; Heb 10:37).

=== Verse 11 ===
The beast that was, and is not, is himself also the eighth, and is of the seven, and is going to perdition.

- "Perdition": or "destruction".

=== Verse 16 ===
And the ten horns which you saw on the beast, these will hate the harlot, make her desolate and naked, eat her flesh and burn her with fire.

- "Naked": compare to allusions in the Old Testament: Isaiah 47:2–3; Ezekiel 16:37–39.

=== Verse 17 ===
For God hath put in their hearts to fulfil his will, and to agree, and give their kingdom unto the beast, until the words of God shall be fulfilled.

=== Verse 18 ===
And the woman which thou sawest is that great city, which reigneth over the kings of the earth.

== See also ==
- Book of Daniel
- Jesus Christ
- John's vision of the Son of Man
- Names and titles of Jesus in the New Testament
- Whore of Babylon
- Related Bible parts: Isaiah 47, Ezekiel 16, Zechariah 12, Revelation 4, Revelation 6, Revelation 13, Revelation 14, Revelation 15, Revelation 16

== Bibliography ==
- Bauckham, Richard (2007). "81. Revelation". In Barton, John; Muddiman, John (eds.). The Oxford Bible Commentary (first (paperback) ed.). Oxford University Press. pp. 1287–1306. ISBN 978-0199277186.
