= List of New Testament minuscules (2901–) =

A New Testament minuscule is a copy of a portion of the New Testament written in a small, cursive Greek script (developed from Uncial).

== Legend ==
- The numbers (#) are the now standard system of Caspar René Gregory, often referred to as the Gregory-Aland numbers.
- Included among the cataloged minuscules are the following types of manuscripts, color coded:

Grey represents continuous text manuscripts containing only New Testament portions
Beige represents manuscripts with New Testament portions and a catena (quotations from church fathers)
Light cyan represents manuscripts of single-author commentaries who included the full Scripture text.
Light red represents manuscripts of single-author commentaries who included both the full Scripture text and a catena.
Light purple represents manuscripts of commentaries where the Scripture text was abridged.
White represents manuscript numbers no longer in use.

- Dates are estimated to the nearest 100 year increment where specific date is unknown.
- Content generally only describes sections of the New Testament: Gospels, The Acts of the Apostles (Acts), Pauline epistles, and so on. Sometimes the surviving portion of a codex is so limited that specific books, chapters or even verses can be indicated. Linked articles, where they exist, generally specify content in detail, by verse.
- Digital images are referenced with direct links to the hosting web pages, with the exception of those at the INTF. The quality and accessibility of the images is as follows:

Gold color indicates high resolution color images available online.
Tan color indicates high resolution color images available locally, not online.
Light tan color indicates only a small fraction of manuscript pages with color images available online.
Light gray color indicates black/white or microfilm images available online.
Light blue color indicates manuscript not imaged, and is currently lost or ownership unknown.
Light pink color indicates manuscript destroyed, presumed destroyed, or deemed too fragile to digitize.
Violet color indicates high resolution ultraviolet images available online.

† Indicates the manuscript has damaged or missing pages.
^{P} Indicates only a portion of the books were included.
^{K} Indicates manuscript also includes a commentary.
^{S} Indicates lost portions of manuscript replaced via supplement of a later hand.
^{abs} (abschrift) Indicates manuscript is copy.
[ ] Brackets around Gregory-Aland number indicate the manuscript belongs to an already numbered manuscript, was found to not be a continuous text manuscript, was found to be written in modern Greek versus Koine Greek, was proved a forgery, or has been destroyed.

== Minuscules 2901–3018 ==
#	Date	Contents	Pages	Institution and refs.	City, State	Country	Images
2901	13th–14th	Gospels	422	Albanian National Archives, ANA 92	Tirana	Albania	CSNTM, INTF
2902	13th	Gospels	308	Albanian National Archives, ANA 93	Tirana	Albania	CSNTM, INTF
2903	12th13th	2 Peter †, John's, Jude, Pauline Epistles †	108	Albanian National Archives ANA 98	Tirana	Albania	CSNTM
2904	11th–12th	Luke 6:45–22:56 †	31	Benaki Museum, Fonds Ancien 63	Athens	Greece	CSNTM, INTF
2905	13th	Gospels	244	Benaki Museum, SK 1	Athens	Greece	CSNTM, INTF
2906	12th	Luke, John †	48	Private Property	Nicosia	Cyprus	Frag.
2907	10th	Gospels^{S}†	284	Private Collection		United Kingdom	CSNTM, INTF
2908	14th	Matthew and John Gospel fragments †	4	Albanian National Archives, ANA Fragment 7	Tirana	Albania	CSNTM, INTF
2909	16th	Gospels, Pauline Epistles (Revelation copied from a printed edition)	123	St. Panteleimon Monastery, 15, f.1-38. 222-317	Mount Athos	Greece	INTF
[2910]=2909							
2911	14th	Gospels	259	Union Theological Seminary, 69	New York, NY	USA	DS, CSNTM
2912	14th–15th	Matthew 21:36-28:20; Mark; Luke 1:1-40	86	Albanian National Archives, ANA 76	Tirana	Albania	CSNTM, INTF
2913	14th	Gospels †	4	Albanian National Archives, ANA Fragment 12	Tirana	Albania	CSNTM, INTF
2914	11th	John 14:24-15:12; 16:30-17:18 †	2	Christ's College, Fragment B	Cambridge	UK	CSNTM, INTF
2915	13th	Luke 11:52-12:39	2	Municipal Library, 43	Tyrnavos	Greece	
2916	13th	Gospels	270	Gennadius Library, Gennadius Κ 20	Athens	Greece	CSNTM, INTF
2917	12th	Revelation	26	National Library, Coislin 202 bis (fol. 1-26)	Paris	France	INTF
2918	1273	Acts, Pauline Epistles, Revelation	206	Vatican Library, Borg.gr.18 (fol. 239-444)	Vatican City	Vatican	INTF
2919	14th–15th	Revelation	15	Vatican Library, Reg.gr.179 (fol. 156-169)	Vatican City	Vatican	INTF
2920	15th	Revelation	30	Marciana National Library, Gr. Z. 10 (394), fol. 382-421	Venice	Italy	INTF
2921	15th	Revelation	20	Herzog August Library, Codd. Aug. 16.7.4°, fol. 186-205	Wolfenbüttel	Germany	INTF
2922	13th	Revelation	22	Esphigmenou Monastery, 67, fol. 209-229	Mount Athos	Greece	INTF
2923	14th	Revelation	32	Iviron Monastery, 60, fol. 199-230	Mount Athos	Greece	INTF
2924	12th–13th	Revelation 14:10-15:2†	2	Royal Site of San Lorenzo de El Escorial, T. III. 17, fol. 175.176	San Lorenzo de El Escorial	Spain	INTF
2925	16th	Gospels†	99	Gennadius Library, Gennadius 266	Athens	Greece	CSNTM, INTF
2926	16th	Acts, Pauline Epistles, Revelation†	74	Greek Orthodox Patriarch of Jerusalem, Saba 676, fol. 1-60.251-263	Jerusalem	Israel	LOC, INTF, CSNTM
2927	11th	Gospel of John 4:23-6:7†	4	Vatopedi Monastery, 1211, f. 12-15	Mount Athos	Greece	
[2928]=2860							
2929	10th	Gospels	228	Museum of the Bible, G.C.MS.000139	Washington, DC	USA	CSNTM
2930	1331	Gospels	178	Iviron Monastery, 1405	Mount Athos	Greece	
2931	1643	Revelation 16:21-22:21†	40	National Library, Supplement Grec 475, fol. 1-40	Paris	France	BnF, INTF
2932	10th	John 10:18-31 †	1	Yale University Library, Beinecke MS 1114	New Haven, CT	USA	YUL, CSNTM, INTF
2933	11th?	Luke 1:1-6 †	1	National Library, NLG 118	Athens	Greece	CSNTM
2933	11th?	Luke 1:1-6 †	1	National Library, NLG 118	Athens	Greece	CSNTM
2933	11th?	Luke 1:1-6 †	1	National Library, NLG 118	Athens	Greece	INTF
2934	11th–14th	Acts 3:2-5, 8-11; 1 John 2:29-3:3, 5:11-15, 18-21†	2	National Library, NLG 2676	Athens	Greece	CSNTM
2934	11th–14th	Acts 3:2-5, 8-11; 1 John 2:29-3:3, 5:11-15, 18-21†	2	National Library, NLG 2676	Athens	Greece	INTF
2935	16th	Mark	44	National Library, NLG 2771, 109a - 153a	Athens	Greece	CSNTM, INTF
2936	1228	Theophylact Commentary on Romans 7:15–16:24†; 1 Corinthians 1:1–16:16<†; 2 Corinthians 1:6–13:14†; Galatians - Philippians; Colossians 1:1-4:11†; 1 Thessalonians 1:3-5:28†; 2 Thessalonians - Hebrews	335	National Library, NLG 3139	Athens	Greece	CSNTM, INTF
2937	10th	Gospels	263	Greek Orthodox Patriarchate, 122	Alexandria	Egypt	
2938	10th–11th	John 2:14-24	1	Tufts University, Welch Collection AC.40.17	Waltham, MA	USA	
2939	10th	Gospels†^{s}	199	Herzogin Anna Amalia Library, Q 743	Weimar	Germany	HAAL
2940	11th–12th	Matthew 28:1-20	2	National Library, 4189, fol. 184-185	Athens	Greece	
2941	11th–12th	Matthew 24:38-25:14	2	Berlin State Library, Ms. or. quart. 805, Bl. 1v-2r	Berlin	Germany	
2942	15th	Matthew	260	Yale University Library, Beinecke MS 714 (fol. 15r-121r)	New Haven, CT	USA	YUL, CSNTM
2943	14th	Luke 3-23†; John 1-11†	54	Owner Unknown			Sotheby's
2944	14th	John 1:1-25; 8:34-10:34†	12	Dunham Bible Museum, Houston Baptist University, 2018.56 + 2019.3	Houston, TX	USA	
2945	c. 1100	Gospels	319	Braidense National Library, Ms. Donazione Castiglioni 4	Milan	Italy	
2946	11th	John 13:27-30	1	Owner unknown (sold 6 July 2016)			Dreweatts
2947	12th	Gospels	421	Iviron Monastery, 2107	Mount Athos	Greece	
2948	1323	Gospels	301	Iviron Monastery, 2110	Mount Athos	Greece	
2949	13th	Gospels	260	Iviron Monastery, 2105	Mount Athos	Greece	
2950	12th	Gospels	278	Iviron Monastery, 2113	Mount Athos	Greece	
2951	13th	Gospels	254	Iviron Monastery, 2112	Mount Athos	Greece	
2952	10th	Acts	72	Laurentian Library, Conv. Soppr. 191 (f. 1-71)	Florence	Italy	BML
2953	12th	Matthew 26:59-75	1	Bryn Mawr College, 2012.11.103	Bryn Mawr, PA	USA	BMC
2954	12th	Gospels	293	Museum of Oltenia, MS. 22	Craiova	Romania	MO
2955	16th	Gospels†	79	V.A. Urechia Library, Ms. V/2	Galati	Romania	
2956	12th	Luke 20:17-21	1	Concattedrale di S. Maria Assunta	Gerace	Italy	
2957	c. 1540	Theophylact Commentary on John	214	Duke University, Greek MS 053	Durham, NC	USA	DU
2958	10th/11th	Matthew / John	7	Vatican Library, Vat. gr. 788B, fol. 2r, 6v, 3r (sic)	Vatican City	Vatican City	
2959	11th/12th	1 Peter 4:4-5:4	1	Vernadsky National Library, Ф. V (OTIS), 3620	Kiev	Ukraine	
2960	13th	Pauline Epistles	20	Vernadsky National Library, Φ. 72 (КГр), 4	Kiev	Ukraine	
2961	11th–12th	Theophylact Commentary on 1 and 2 Corinthians	347	Saint Catherine's Monastery, Gr. 308	Sinai	Egypt	LOC
2962	10th	Paul's Epistles	309	Bodleian Library, Auct. T. 1. 7 (Misc. 185)	Oxford	United Kingdom	
2963	1290	Gospels	154	National Library of France, Suppl. Gr. 1259, fol. 1-154	Paris	France	BnF
2964	11th/12th	Matthew, John	187	National Library, Gr. 200	Paris	France	BnF
2965	1360–1380	John (Nicetas Catena)	502	Regional Museum, MIK 6370	Mikulov	Czech Republic	MS
2966	10th/11th	Romans	2	Vernadsky National Library, Φ. I (Лм), 137/1	Kiev	Ukraine	
2967	12th	Gospels	309	Iviron Monastery, (2108)	Mount Athos	Greece	
2968	12th	Gospels	278	Iviron Monastery, (2109)	Mount Athos	Greece	
2969	12th	Gospels	326	Iviron Monastery, (2114)	Mount Athos	Greece	
2970	18th	Revelation 1:1-21:9	52	Evangelistria Monastery, 71	Skiathos	Greece	
2971	14th	Gospels	198	Dikigorikos Syllogos Library, 1	Rethymno	Crete, Greece	
2972							
2973	18th	Gospels	108	Pantokratoros Monastery, 2005	Mount Athos	Greece	MAR
2974	14th–15th	Gospels	285	Protaton Church, 83, fol. 1-285	Mount Athos	Greece	MAR
2975	14th	Matthew (Nicetas Catena)	143	Bodleian Library, Auct. E.2.2, ff. 1–109 and 244–277	Oxford	United Kingdom	
2976	1316	Theophylact Commentary on Luke	15	National Library, Grec 214, fol. 221-235	Paris	France	BnF
2977	14th	Theophylact Commentary on John	183	National Library, Grec 233	Paris	France	BnF
2978	16th	Pauline Epistles, General Epistles	37	Vallicelliana Library, F. 9, fol. 21-52	Rome	Italy	
2979	14th	Theophylact Commentary on John	170	Saint Catherine's Monastery, Gr. 307	Sinai	Egypt	LoC
2980	1552	Gospel of Luke	275	Municipal Library, 13	Perpignan	France	ML
2981	16th	Matthew 5:17-35; 7:3, 6, 7, 9-23	2	Vatican Library, Vat. gr. 2275, ff. 45–46	Vatican City	Vatican City	DVL
2982	17th	Zigabenus Commentary on Matthew 1:1-7, 20-25; 2:7-3:1	9	Vatican Library, Vat. gr. 2275, fol. 155-163	Vatican City	Vatican City	DVL
2983	17th	Theophylact Commentary on John 1:5-7	1	Vatican Library, Vat. gr. 2275, fol. 184	Vatican City	Vatican City	DVL
2984	14th	Theophylact Commentary on Matthew	78	Yale University Library, Beinecke MS 235, fol. 136r-213v	New Haven, CT	United States	YUL
2985	15th	Theophylact Commentary on John	215	Vatican Library, Vat. gr. 1753, fol. 246-461	Vatican City	Vatican City	DVL
2986	14th	Gospel of John 14:19-21:25; 8:3-11	39	University Library, A.III.51	Basel	Switzerland	
2987	12th	Pauline Epistles, General Epistles	268	Royal Site of San Lorenzo de El Escorial, Y. II. 1	San Lorenzo de El Escorial	Spain	RBME
2988	14th/15th	Theophylact Commentary on Matthew	88	National Library of Austria, Theol. gr. 209, fol. 56-143	Vienna	Austria	
2989	13th	Theophylact Commentary on Luke, John	158	National Museum, 76	Ohrid	Macedonia	
2990	11th	Gospel of Luke	38	Angelica Library, Ang. gr. 67, fol. 139-177	Rome	Italy	IC
2991		Revelation	144	National Library of Spain, 4589, fol. 1-144	Madrid	Spain	NLS
2992	14th	Revelation	50	National University Library, Peyron, 12	Turin	Italy	
2993	12th	Matthew (Nicetas Catena)	114	Biblioteca Nazionale Universitaria, B.III.25	Turin	Italy	
2994	11th	Matthew and Luke	55	Dikigorikos Syllogos Library, 2	Rhethymno, Crete	Greece	
2995	14th	Theophylact Commentary on the Gospels	1	Monastery of Korona, 6	Karditsa	Greece	
2996	13th/14th	Acts	8	Ecclesiastical Historical and Archival Institute of the Patriarchate of Bulgaria, EHAI 908, fol. 231-238	Sofia	Bulgaria	
2997	16th	Theophylact Commentary on the Gospels	1	Greek Orthodox Patriarchate, Saba 300	Jerusalem		
2998	14th	Theophylact Commentary on the Gospels	152	Great Meteoron Monastery, 373	Meteora	Greece	
2999	16th	Zigabenus Commentary on the Pauline Epistles	137	Bavarian State Library, Cod. graec. 259	Munich	Germany	BSL
3000	11th/12th	Gospels	275	Herzogin Anna Amalia Library, Oct 452	Weimar	Germany	HAAL
3001	1230	Theophylact Commentary on John	132	Herzogin Anna Amalia Library, Fol. 516	Weimar	Germany	HAAL
3002	14th	Gospels	166	Archbishopric Collection, 65	Nicosia	Cyprus	
3003	10th	Gospel of Mark	3	Library of the Russian Academy of Science, RAIK 15	Saint Petersburg	Russia	
3004	ca. 1775	Revelation	484	National Library of Spain, 4836	Madrid	Spain	NLS
3005	ca. 1775	Revelation	125	National Library of Spain, 4663, fol. 7-132	Madrid	Spain	NLS
3006	1717	Revelation	39	Ecclesiastical Historical and Archival Institute of the Patriarchate of Bulgaria, EHAI 876, fol. 133-174	Sofia	Bulgaria	
3007	10th	Revelation 1:1	2	Laurentian Medicean Library, Pluteo VI.19, fol. 173-174	Florence	Italy	
3008	13th/14th	Luke 1:74-2:14	1	Parrocchia di S. Maria del Gamio e delle Armi, frammento 42	Saracena	Italy	
3008	13th/14th	Luke 2:46-3:9	1	Chiesa Monumentale di San Guliano	Castrovillari	Italy	
3009	14th	Matthew, Mark, and Luke	155	St. John the Theologian Monastery, 304, fol. 162-316	Patmos	Greece	
3010	15th	Matthew 1:12-5:7	7	National Library of Austria, Hist. gr. 88, fol. 245-251	Vienna	Austria	
3011	15th/16th	Luke 1:26-79	3	Communale Augusta Library, G 11, fol. 79-81	Perugia	Italy	
3012	15th	John 1:1-5:6	10	Fitzwilliam Museum, MS CFM 30	Cambridge	United Kingdom	FM
3013							
3014	13th/14th	Gospels	371	Dousikou Monastery, 121	Trikala	Greece	
3015	10th	John 11:57-12:40	2	Bodleian Library, Lincoln College, Ms. Gr. 23	Oxford	United Kingdom	
3016	10th	Gospels	270	German National Library, Klemmsammlung I,101 (Olim Eing. 1973/532)	Leipzig	Germany	
3017	10th/11th	Gospels	242	German National Library, Klemmsammlung I, 102 (Olim Eing. 1973/531)	Leipzig	Germany	
3018	14th	Gospels	137	Karakalou Monastery, Monastery 100	Mount Athos	Greece	

[top]

== See also ==
- List of New Testament papyri
- List of New Testament uncials
- List of New Testament minuscules (1–1000)
- List of New Testament minuscules (1001–2000)
- List of New Testament minuscules (2001–)
- List of New Testament minuscules ordered by Location/Institution
- List of New Testament lectionaries

== Bibliography ==
- Aland, Kurt; M. Welte; B. Köster; K. Junack (1994). Kurzgefasste Liste der griechischen Handschriften des Neues Testaments. Berlin, New York: Walter de Gruyter. p. 95. ISBN 3-11-011986-2.
- "Liste Handschriften". Münster: Institute for New Testament Textual Research.
- Parpulov, Georgi (2021). Catena Manuscripts of the Greek New Testament (PDF). Piscataway New Jersey: Gorgias Press. p. 241. ISBN 978-1-4632-4260-2.
