= Song of Moses (disambiguation) =

There are two songs in the Hebrew Bible known as the Song of Moses:

- The Song of the Sea (Exodus 15), commencing with the Latin incipit Cantemus Domino: "I will sing to the Lord, for he has triumphed gloriously; the horse and his rider he has thrown into the sea." (Exodus 15:1)
- The Song of Moses (Deuteronomy 32), commencing with the Latin incipit Audite caeli: "Give ear, O heavens, and I will speak, and let the earth hear the words of my mouth." (Deuteronomy 32:1)

The song of the Saints in Revelation 15:3-4 is described as the "song of Moses, the servant of God".

The Latin name Canticum Moysis may be used for either of the songs.

The Song of Moses is also the title of an oratorio written by the English composer Thomas Linley the Younger in 1777.
