= Revelation 16 =

- ← chapter 15 chapter 17 →
- Revelation 13:16-14:4 on Papyrus 47 from the third century.
- Book: Book of Revelation
- Category: Apocalypse
- Christian Bible part: New Testament
- Order in the Christian part: 27

Revelation 16 is the sixteenth chapter of the Book of Revelation or the Apocalypse of John in the New Testament of the Christian Bible. The book is traditionally attributed to John the Apostle, but the precise identity of the author remains a point of academic debate. This chapter describes the seven bowls, vials or phials of God's wrath, poured out on the wicked and the followers of the Antichrist after the sounding of the seven trumpets, on the command of "a loud voice from the temple" heard by the author.

== Text ==
The original text was written in Koine Greek. This chapter is divided into 21 verses.

=== Textual witnesses ===
Some early manuscripts containing the text of this chapter are among others: (Note: The Book of Revelation is missing from Codex Vaticanus.)

- Papyrus 47 (3rd century; complete)
- Codex Sinaiticus (330-360)
- Codex Alexandrinus (400-440)
- Codex Ephraemi Rescriptus (ca. 450; extant verse 1-12)
- Papyrus 43 (6th/7th century; extant verse 1-2)

=== Old Testament references ===
- Revelation 16:19: Jeremiah 25:15

=== New Testament references ===
- Revelation 16:15: Matthew 24:44

== The seven bowls (16:1–21) ==
=== Verse 1 ===
Then I heard a loud voice from the temple saying to the seven angels, "Go and pour out the bowls of the wrath of God on the earth."

- "From the temple": from the words in Biblical Greek: ἐκ τοῦ ναοῦ, romanized: ek tou naou, "from the temple", or "from the sanctuary", do not appear in some ancient versions, and Tischendorf omitted them from his critical edition. German Protestant theologian Heinrich Meyer argues that the inclusion of these words "is guaranteed by A, C, א, and some other manuscripts, "and is entirely suitable".

== The fourth bowl (16:8–9) ==
=== Verse 8 ===
And the fourth angel poured out his vial upon the sun; and power was given unto him to scorch men with fire.

- "Men": from Biblical Greek: ἄνθρωπος, romanized: anthrōpos in generic use refers to 'both men and women'.

=== Verse 9 ===
And men were scorched with great heat, and blasphemed the name of God, which hath power over these plagues: and they repented not to give him glory.

- "Men": from Biblical Greek: ἄνθρωπος, romanized: anthrōpos in generic use refers to 'both men and women'.

== The sixth bowl (16:12–16) ==
=== Verse 12 ===
Then the sixth angel poured out his bowl on the great river Euphrates, and its water was dried up, so that the way of the kings from the east might be prepared.

- "From the east": translated from the Greek phrase with literal meaning "from the rising of the sun" here in the sense of 'a geographical direction' (cf. Revelation 7:2; 16:12; 21:13).

=== Verse 16 ===
And they gathered them together to the place called in Hebrew, Armageddon.

- "Armageddon": identified with Har-megiddo, "the mountain of Megiddo", which may refer to 'the slaying of Josiah in the valley of Megiddo', which 'became proverbial for any great sorrow' (2 Chronicles 35:22; 2 Chronicles 35:25; Zechariah 12:11) or 'to the slaughter of Sisera's army at the waters of Megiddo', by Barak, (Judges 5:19).

== See also ==
- Armageddon
- Book of Daniel
- Jesus Christ
- John's vision of the Son of Man
- Names and titles of Jesus in the New Testament
- Seven bowls
- Related Bible parts: Zechariah 12, Revelation 4, Revelation 6, Revelation 13, Revelation 14, Revelation 15, Revelation 17
