= Whore of Babylon =

Female figure and also place of evil mentioned in the Book of Revelation

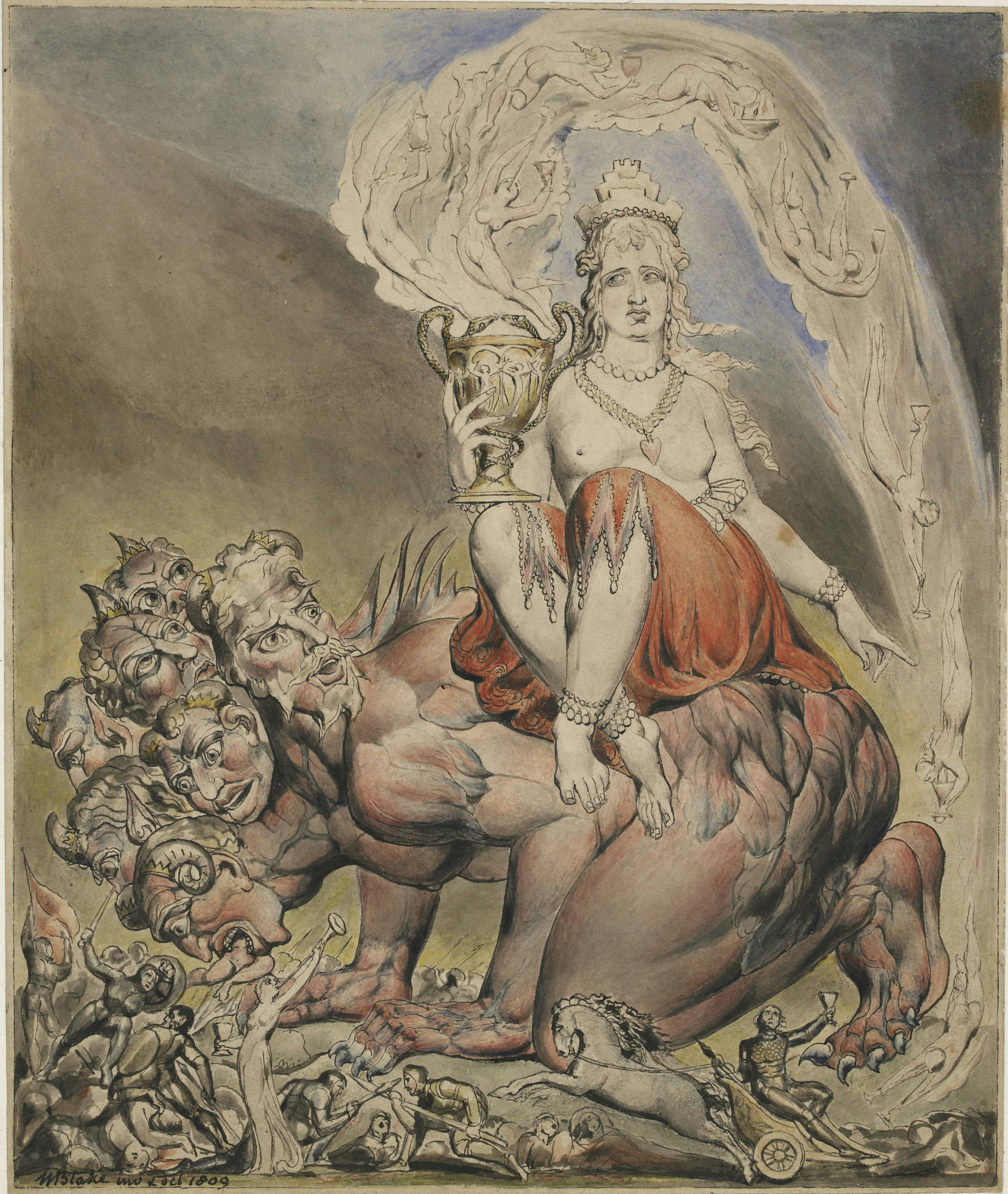
1809 painting of the Whore of Babylon by William Blake

Babylon the Great, commonly known as the Whore of Babylon, refers to both a symbolic female figure and a place of malevolence as mentioned in the Book of Revelation of the New Testament. Her full title is stated in Revelation 17:5 as "Mystery, Babylon the Great, the Mother of Harlots and Abominations of the Earth" (Greek: μυστήριον, Βαβυλὼν ἡ μεγάλη, ἡ μήτηρ τῶν πορνῶν καὶ τῶν βδελυγμάτων τῆς γῆς, romanized: mystḗrion, Babylṑn hē megálē, hē mḗtēr tôn pornôn kaì tôn bdelygmátōn tês gês).

She is further identified as a representation of "that great city, which reigneth over the kings of the earth" in Revelation 17:18.

== Passages from Revelation ==
The "great whore" of the Book of Revelation is featured in chapter 17:

^{1}And there came one of the seven angels which had the seven vials, and talked with me, saying unto me, Come hither; I will shew unto thee the judgment of the great whore that sitteth upon many waters: ^{2}With whom the kings of the earth have committed fornication, and the inhabitants of the earth have been made drunk with the wine of her fornication. ^{3}So he carried me away in the spirit into the wilderness: and I saw a woman sit upon a scarlet coloured beast, full of names of blasphemy, having seven heads and ten horns. ^{4}And the woman was arrayed in purple and scarlet colour, and decked with gold and precious stones and pearls, having a golden cup in her hand full of abominations and filthiness of her fornication: ^{5}And upon her forehead was a name written, MYSTERY, BABYLON THE GREAT, THE MOTHER OF HARLOTS AND ABOMINATIONS OF THE EARTH. ^{6}And I saw the woman drunken with the blood of the saints, and with the blood of the martyrs of Jesus: and when I saw her, I wondered with great admiration. [...] ^{9}And here is the mind which hath wisdom. The seven heads are seven mountains, on which the woman sitteth. ^{10}And there are seven kings: five are fallen, and one is, and the other is not yet come; and when he comes, he must continue a short space. ^{11}And the beast that was, and is not, even he is the eighth, and is of the seven, and goes into perdition. ^{12}And the ten horns which thou saw are ten kings, which have received no kingdom as yet; but receive power as kings one hour with the beast. [...] ^{15}And he said unto me, The waters which thou sawest, where the whore sitteth, are peoples, and multitudes, and nations, and tongues. [...] ^{18}And the woman which thou sawest is that great city, which reigns over the kings of the earth.

— Revelation 17:1–6, 9–12, 15, 18, King James Bible

== Symbolism ==
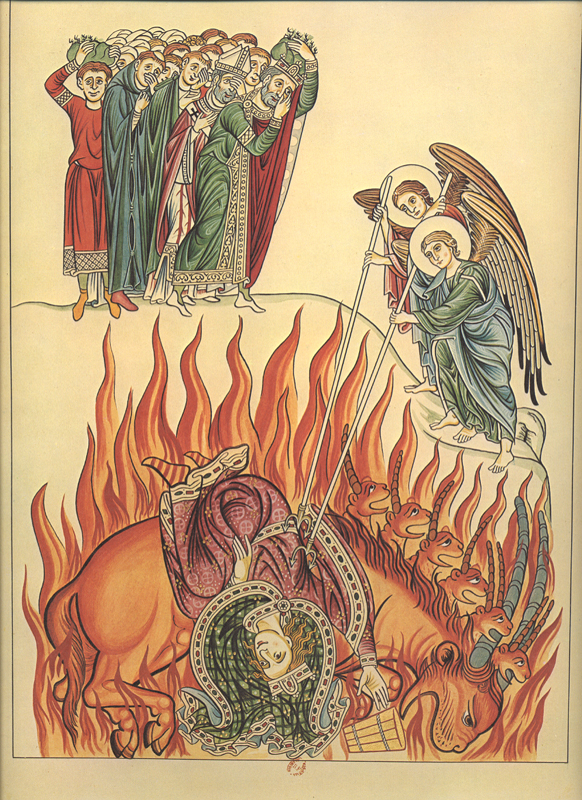
The whore of Babylon as illustrated in Hortus deliciarum by Herrad of Landsberg, 1180

The Whore is associated with the Beast of Revelation by connection with an equally evil kingdom. The word whore can also be translated metaphorically as 'Idolatress'. The Whore's apocalyptic downfall is prophesied to take place in the hands of the image of the beast with seven heads and ten horns. There is much speculation within Christian eschatology on what the Whore and Beast symbolize as well as the possible implications for contemporary interpretations.

Caroline Vander Stichele demonstrated that the narrative of the Whore of Babylon follows many of the same patterns of the personification of capital cities as women who commit "prostitution/whoredom" and/or "adultery" in the prophetic books of the Hebrew Bible. These capital cities, representing the states they govern, are alleged to have committed various sins that have rendered them sexually promiscuous, and therefore they will eventually be annihilated through various well-deserved violent punishments sent by the Israelite God Yahweh.

=== Rome ===
In the First Epistle of Peter (1 Peter 5:13), the author implies they are in "Babylon", which has been held to be a coded reference to Rome. Many Biblical scholars believe that "Babylon" is a metaphor for the pagan Roman Empire at the time it persecuted Christians, before the Edict of Milan in 313. According to Eusebius of Caesarea Babylon would be Rome or the Roman Empire:

And Peter makes mention of Mark in his first epistle which they say that he wrote in Rome itself, as is indicated by him, when he calls the city, by a figure, Babylon, as he does in the following words: «The church that is at Babylon, elected together with you, salutes you; and so does Marcus my son.»(1 Peter 5:13)

Some biblical scholars recognize that "Babylon" is a cipher for Rome or the Roman Empire but believe Babylon is not limited to the Roman city of the first century. Craig Koester says outright that "the whore is Rome, yet more than Rome." It "is the Roman imperial world, which in turn represents the world alienated from God." In 4 Ezra, 2 Baruch and the Sibylline Oracles, "Babylon" is a cryptic name for Rome. In Revelation 17:9 it is said that she sits on "seven mountains", (Note: Both the King James Version Bible and the New International Version use the words "seven hills") typically understood as the seven hills of Rome. A Roman coin minted under the Emperor Vespasian (c. 70 AD) depicts Rome as a woman sitting on seven hills.

According to the International Standard Bible Encyclopedia, "The characteristics ascribed to this Babylon apply to Rome rather than to any other city of that age: (a) as ruling over the kings of the earth (Revelation 17:18); (b) as sitting on seven mountains (Revelation 17:9); (c) as the center of the world's merchandise (Revelation 18:3, 11–13); (d) as the corrupter of the nations (Revelation 17:2; 18:3; 19:2); (e) as the persecutor of the saints (Revelation 17:6)."

=== Jerusalem ===
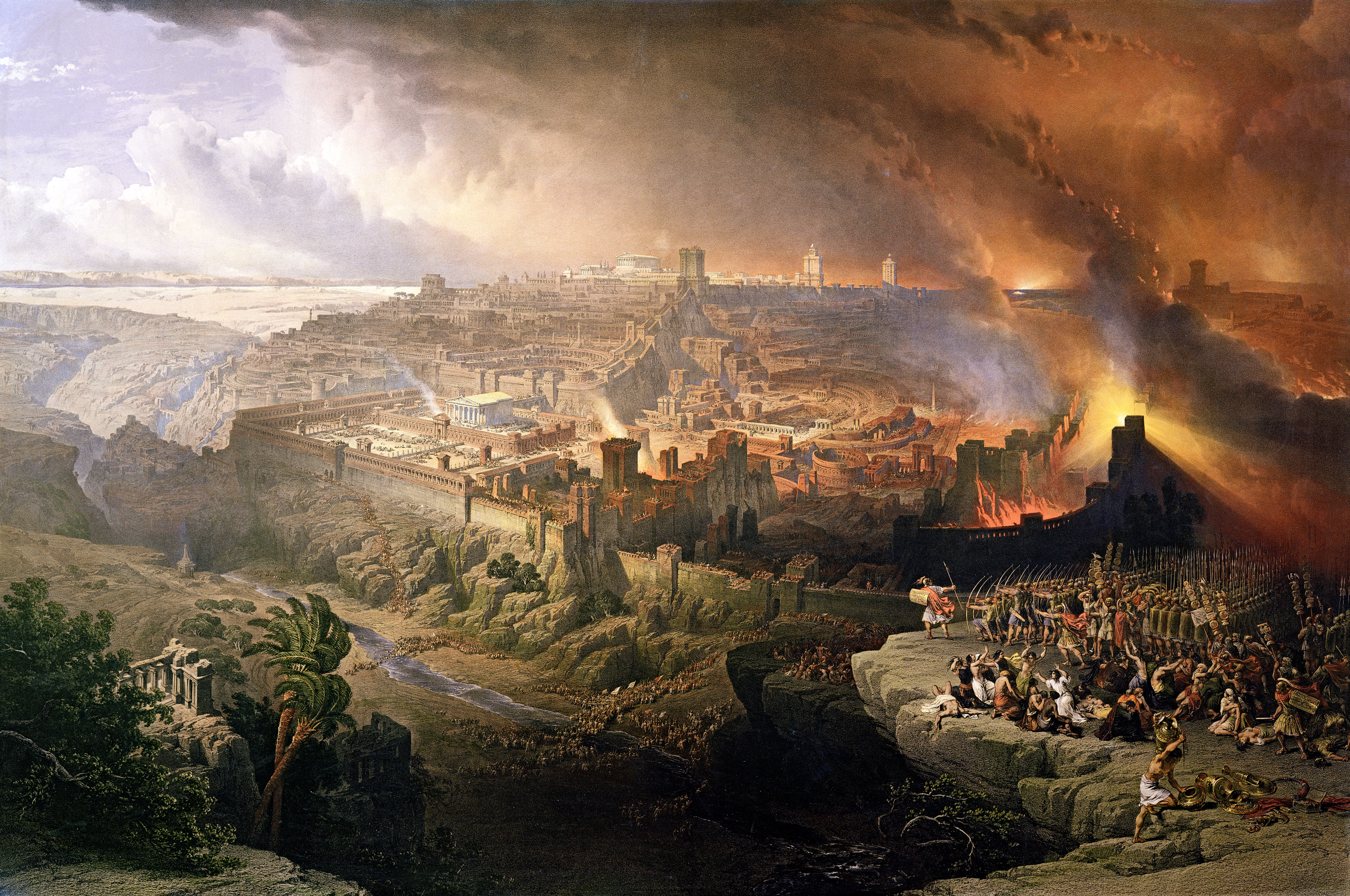
The Siege and Destruction of Jerusalem, by David Roberts (1850)

Biblical scholars such as Alan James Beagley, David Chilton, J. Massyngberde Ford, Peter Gaskell, Kenneth Gentry, Edmondo Lupieri, Bruce Malina, Iain Provan, J. Stuart Russell, Milton S. Terry point out that although Rome was the prevailing pagan power in the 1st century, when the Book of Revelation was written, the symbolism of the whore of Babylon refers not to an invading infidel or foreign power. It refers to an apostate false queen, a former "bride" who has been unfaithful and who, even though she has been divorced and cast out because of unfaithfulness, continues to falsely claim to be the "queen" of the spiritual realm. This symbolism did not fit the case of Rome at the time. Proponents of this view suggest that the "seven mountains" in Revelation 17:9 are the seven hills on which Jerusalem stands and the "fall of Babylon" in Rev 18 is the fall and destruction of Jerusalem in 70 AD.

Several Old Testament prophets referred to Jerusalem as being a spiritual harlot and a mother of such harlotry (Isaiah 1:21; Jeremiah 2:20; 3:1–11; Ezekiel 16:1–43; 23, as well as Epistle to the Galatians 4:25). Some of these Old Testament prophecies, as well as the warnings in the New Testament concerning Jerusalem, resemble the text concerning Babylon in Revelation. This suggests that John of Patmos may have been citing those prophecies in his description of Babylon.

For example, in Matthew 23:34–37 and Luke 11:47–51, Jesus assigned all of the bloodguilt for the killing of the prophets and of the saints to the Pharisees of Jerusalem. In Revelation 17:6 and 18:20,b24, similar phrasing is used in charging the bloodguilt to Babylon. This is also bolstered by Jesus' statement that "it's not possible for a prophet to be killed outside of Jerusalem." (Luke 13:33).

== Historicist and idealistic interpretations ==
=== Catholic view ===
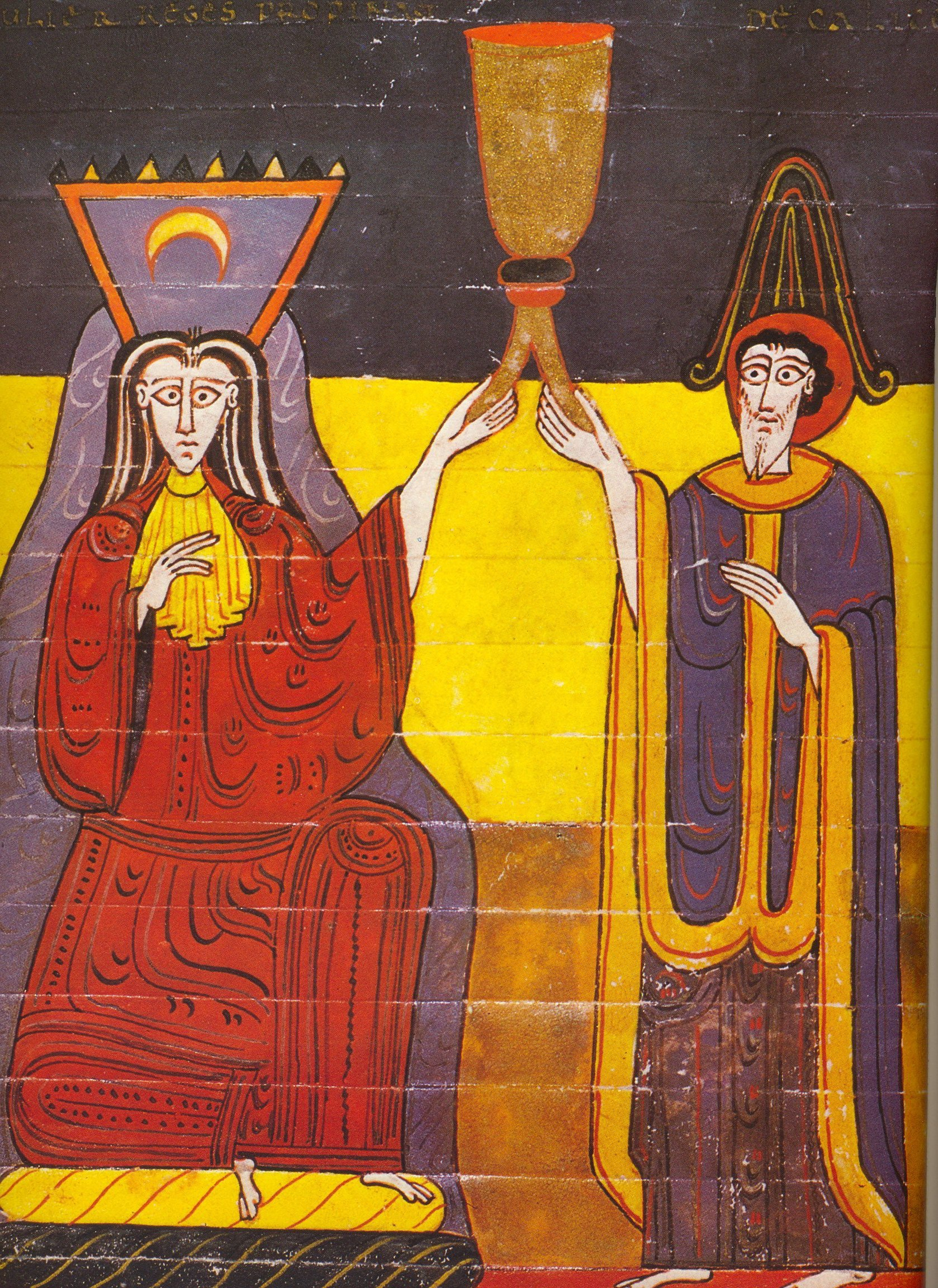
For medieval Spanish Catholics, the Whore of Babylon (a Christian allegory of evil) was incarnated by the Emirate of Córdoba.

In the most common medieval and Catholic view, deriving from Augustine of Hippo's The City of God (early 5th century), Babylon and Jerusalem referred to two spiritual cities which were spiritually at war with one another, throughout all of history:

Babylon [from Babel] is interpreted confusion, Jerusalem vision of peace. [...] They are mingled, and from the very beginning of mankind mingled they run on unto the end of the world. [...]✓Two loves make up these two cities: love of God makes Jerusalem, love of the world makes Babylon.

They also represented two principles at war with one another, inside each individual person, even inside seemingly worldly Christian monarchs; thus Augustine could boast approvingly, "believing [Christian] monarchs of this world came to the city of Rome, as to the head of Babylon: they went not to the temple of the Emperor, but to the tomb of the Fisherman."

Some sedevacantists believe that the post-concilliar church is the Whore of Babylon.

=== Reformation view ===
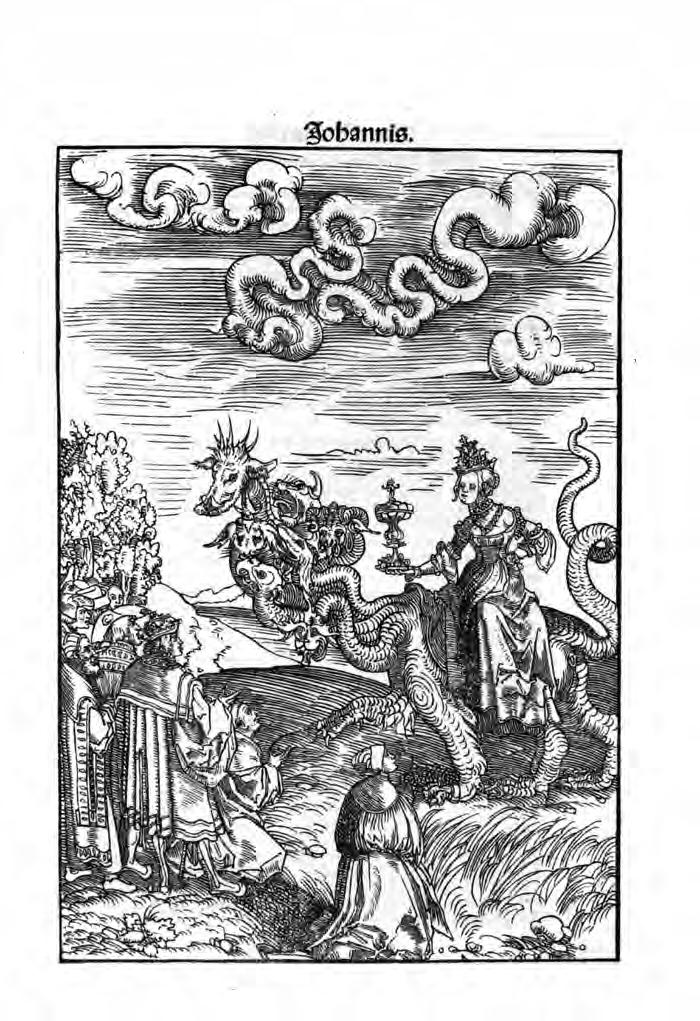
Whore of Babylon wearing the papal tiara from a woodcut in Luther Bible

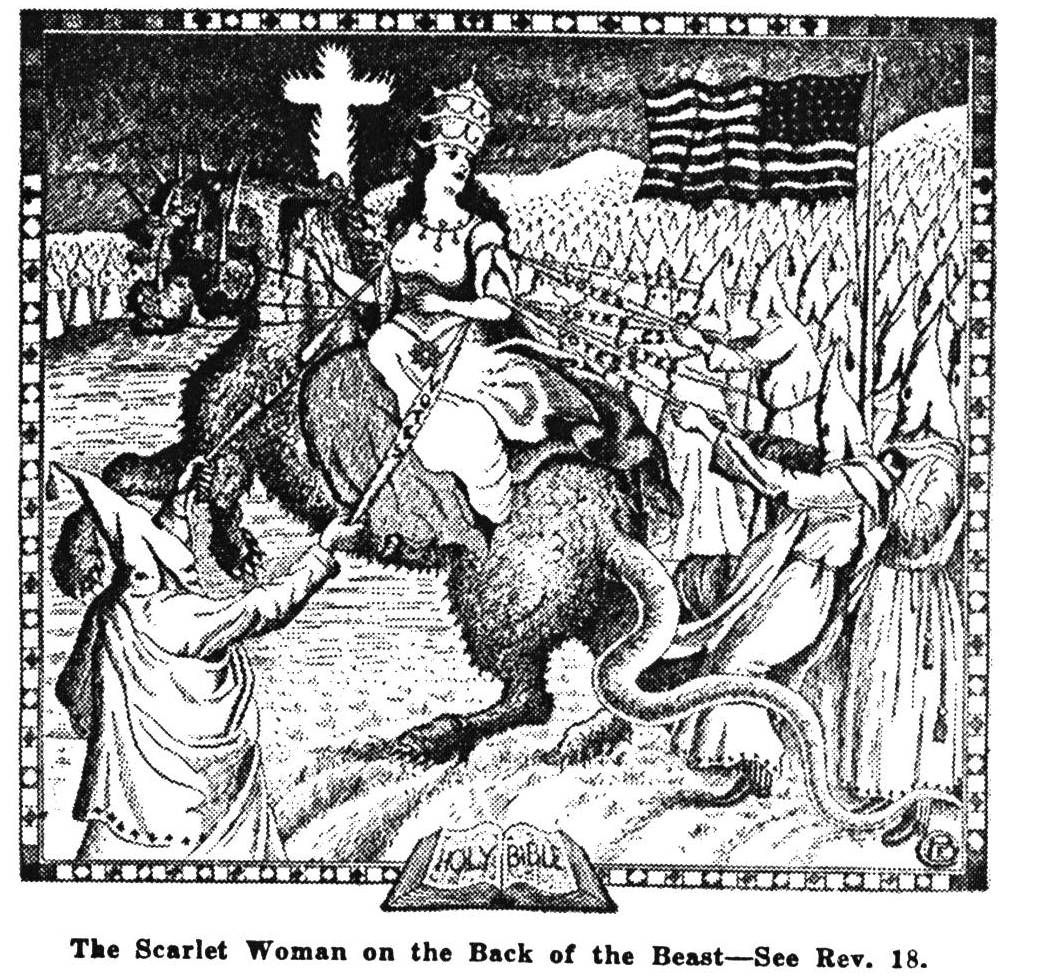
Ku Klux Klan cartoon depicting the Whore of Babylon wearing the papal tiara, 1925

Historicist interpreters commonly used the phrase "Whore of Babylon" to refer to the Catholic Church. Reformation writers Martin Luther (1483–1546, author of On the Babylonian Captivity of the Church), John Calvin (1509–1564), and John Knox (1510–1572, author of The First Blast of the Trumpet Against the Monstruous Regiment of Women) taught this association.

Most early Protestant Reformers believed, and the modern Seventh-day Adventist Church teaches, that in Bible prophecy a woman represents a church. The connection noted on the seven hills of Rome is argued to locate the church.

Identification of the Pope as the Antichrist was written into Protestant creeds such as the Westminster Confession of 1646. The identification of the Roman Catholic Church with the Whore of Babylon is kept in the Scofield Reference Bible (whose 1917 edition identified "ecclesiastical Babylon" with "apostate Christendom headed by the Papacy"). An image from the 1545 edition of Luther's Bible depicts the Whore as wearing the papal tiara.

=== Latter-day Saint view ===
The Church of Jesus Christ of Latter-day Saints (LDS Church) views the Whore of Babylon and its Book of Mormon equivalent, the "great and abominable church", as having dominion over the entire earth and representing a powerful collection of groups and carnal individuals seeking wealth, sexual immorality, dominion, and the persecution or death of saints. The Whore of Babylon, or the Devil's Church, consists of all organisations not associated with the followers of Christ or that are against his followers. Ultimately, the Whore of Babylon's fate is to be destroyed in the last days.

=== Seventh-day Adventist view ===
Seventh-day Adventists believe that the whore of Babylon represents the fallen state of traditional Christianity, especially the fallen state of Christianity in the Catholic Church (cf. the Great Apostasy). Other churches (predominantly Protestant) are generally considered either part of the harlot or her daughters. Adventists further hold the view that the persecution of the "saints" in Revelation 17:6 represents the persecution of believers who rejected the doctrines which were introduced by the Roman Catholic Church because they were based on pagan Roman beliefs. The persecution of anyone who opposed the Catholic Church during the Middle Ages, especially by the Inquisition, and the persecution of the Waldensians and the Huguenots are cited as examples of this persecution.

Seventh-day Adventists interpret Revelation 17:18 as a prophecy about the false church, which has power over the kings of the earth. They consider the pope to be in apostasy for allowing pagan rituals, beliefs and ceremonies to come into the church. They consider the Papacy, as a continuation of the Roman Empire, to be a fulfillment of 2 Thessalonians 2:7: "For the secret power of lawlessness is already at work; but the one who now holds it back will continue to do so till he is taken out of the way."

Ellen G. White's The Great Controversy (1858) states that "Spiritual Babylon" would have worldwide influence, affecting "all nations", that the Imperial Roman Empire could not meet the criteria, because she wrote that it only had influence in the Old World. Like many reformation-era Protestant leaders, her writings also describe the Catholic Church as a fallen church, and it plays a nefarious eschatological role as the antagonist against God's true church and that the pope is the Antichrist.

=== Jehovah's Witnesses view ===
Jehovah's Witnesses, whose early teachings were strongly influenced by Adventism but have since diverged, believe that the Whore of Babylon represents "the world empire of false religion", referring to all other religious groups including, but not limited to, Christendom. Jehovah's Witnesses literature frequently refers to the "Great Harlot" of Babylon and the subsequent attack on her by the political powers, signaling the beginning of the "great tribulation". They believe that the empire of false religion has persecuted God's people, and that "false religion" has committed "fornication" with the world's political and commercial elements, based on their interpretation of Revelation 17:1–2.

=== View in Thelema ===
Babalon (also known as the "Scarlet Woman" or "Mother of Abominations") is a goddess found in Thelema, a religious system which was established in 1904 with the writing of The Book of the Law by English writer Aleister Crowley. The spelling of the name as "Babalon" was revealed by Crowley in his The Vision and the Voice. Her name and imagery are featured in Crowley's Liber Cheth vel Vallum Abiegni.

In her most abstract form, Babalon represents the female sexual impulse and the liberated woman. In the creed of the Gnostic Mass she is also identified with Mother Earth, in her most fertile sense. Along with her status as an archetype or goddess, Crowley believed that Babalon had an earthly aspect or avatar; a living woman who occupied the spiritual office of the 'Scarlet Woman'. This office, first identified in The Book of the Law is usually described as a counterpart to his own identification as "To Mega Therion" (The Great Beast). The role of the Scarlet Woman was to help manifest the energies of the Aeon of Horus. Crowley believed that several women in his life occupied the office of Scarlet Woman, for which see the list below.

Babalon's consort is Chaos, called the "Father of Life" in the Gnostic Mass, being the male form of the creative principle. Chaos appears in The Vision and the Voice and later in Liber Cheth vel Vallum Abiegni. Separate from her relationship with her consort, Babalon is usually depicted as riding the Beast. She is often referred to as a sacred whore, and her primary symbol is the chalice or graal.

As Crowley wrote in his The Book of Thoth, "she rides astride the Beast; in her left hand she holds the reins, representing the passion which unites them. In her right she holds aloft the cup, the Holy Grail aflame with love and death. In this cup are mingled the elements of the sacrament of the Aeon."

== See also ==
- Anti-Catholicism
- Barbēlō
- Book of Daniel
- Great Apostasy
- Rastafari § Exile in Babylon
- The Two Babylons
- Woman of the Apocalypse
