= The Beast (Revelation) =

Character in the Book of Revelation

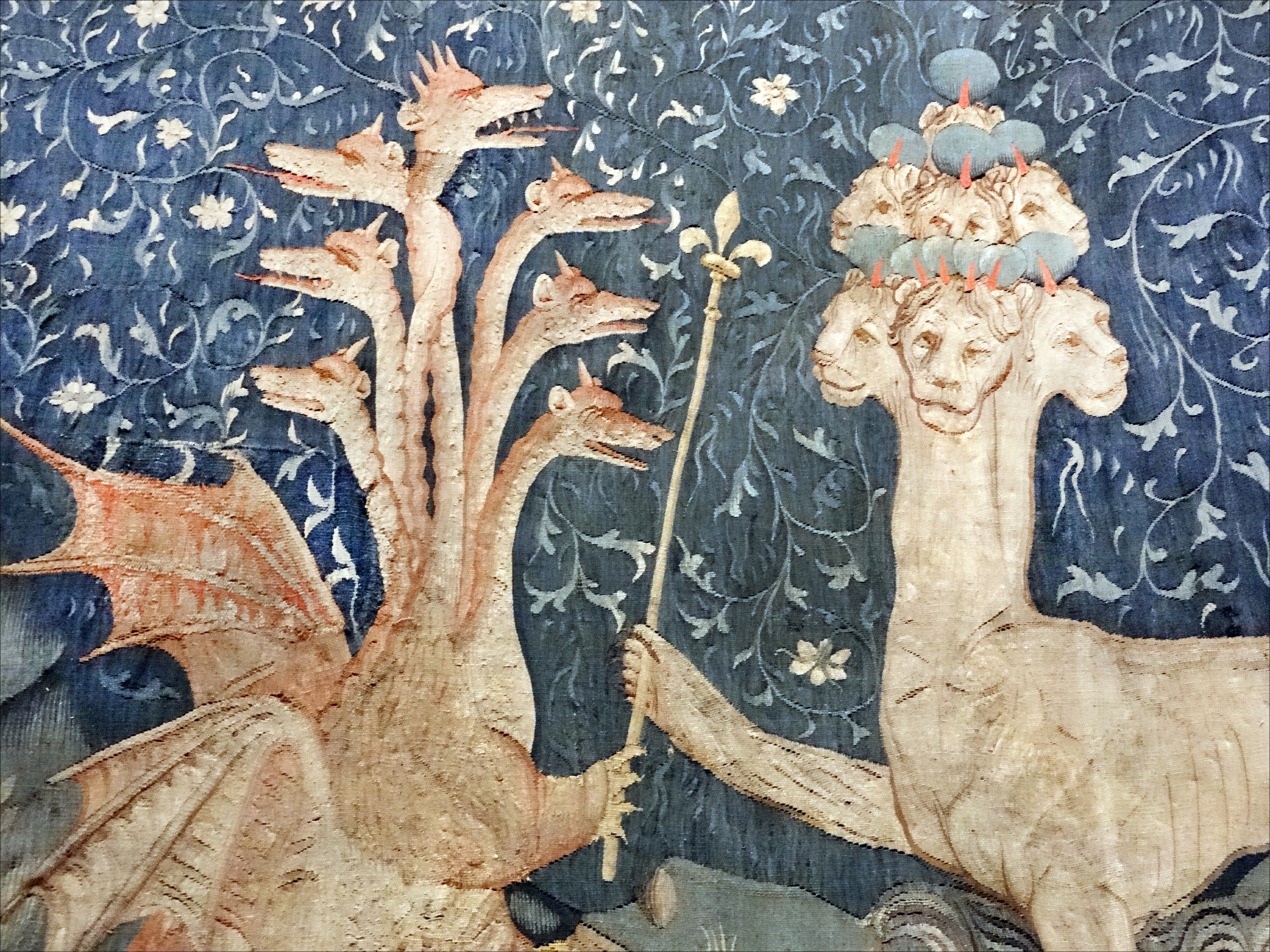
Satan (the dragon; on the left) gives to the beast of the sea (on the right) power represented by a sceptre in a detail of panel III.40 of the medieval French Apocalypse Tapestry, produced between 1377-82.

The Beast (Koine Greek: Θηρίον, Thērion) may refer to one of three beasts described in the Book of Revelation.

Revelation 12-13 describes these three beasts as follows:

1. The dragon (later revealed in the text to be Satan)
2. The beast of the sea (commonly interpreted as the Antichrist)
3. The beast of the earth (later revealed in the text to be the false prophet)

However, many people have different beliefs about the meaning of these beasts.

In Revelation 13:1–10, the beast of the sea rises "out of the sea" and is given authority and power by the dragon. It persecutes God's people in the 2nd part of Revelation 13. To buy and sell, everyone is required to have its name or number on their forehead or right hand (Rev 13:16-17). It speaks blasphemous words against God, will rule the world for 42 months (Revelation 13:5-7), and is described as resembling a leopard, a lion, and a bear—which are three of the animals in Daniel 7. It suffers a fatal head wound which is miraculously healed, bewildering the world's population and causing many to worship it.

In Revelation 13:11–18, the beast of the earth, later known as the false prophet, comes "out of the earth," exercises all the authority of the Sea Beast, forces everyone on earth to worship the Sea Beast, and convinces the people, through signs and wonders, to make an image of the Sea Beast.

In their fight against God, the Sea Beast and the False Prophet ally with the Dragon to persecute the "saints" and those who do not "worship the image of the beast [of the sea]" and influence earthly kings through three unclean spirits to gather for the battle of Armageddon. These two beasts are ultimately defeated by Christ and thrown into the lake of fire mentioned in Revelation 19:18–20, while Satan, the dragon, is imprisoned in the bottomless pit for 1,000 years. After being released from the bottomless pit after the millennial reign, Satan deceives the nations one last time, ultimately ending in Satan being defeated and thrown in the lake of fire.

== Book of Revelation ==
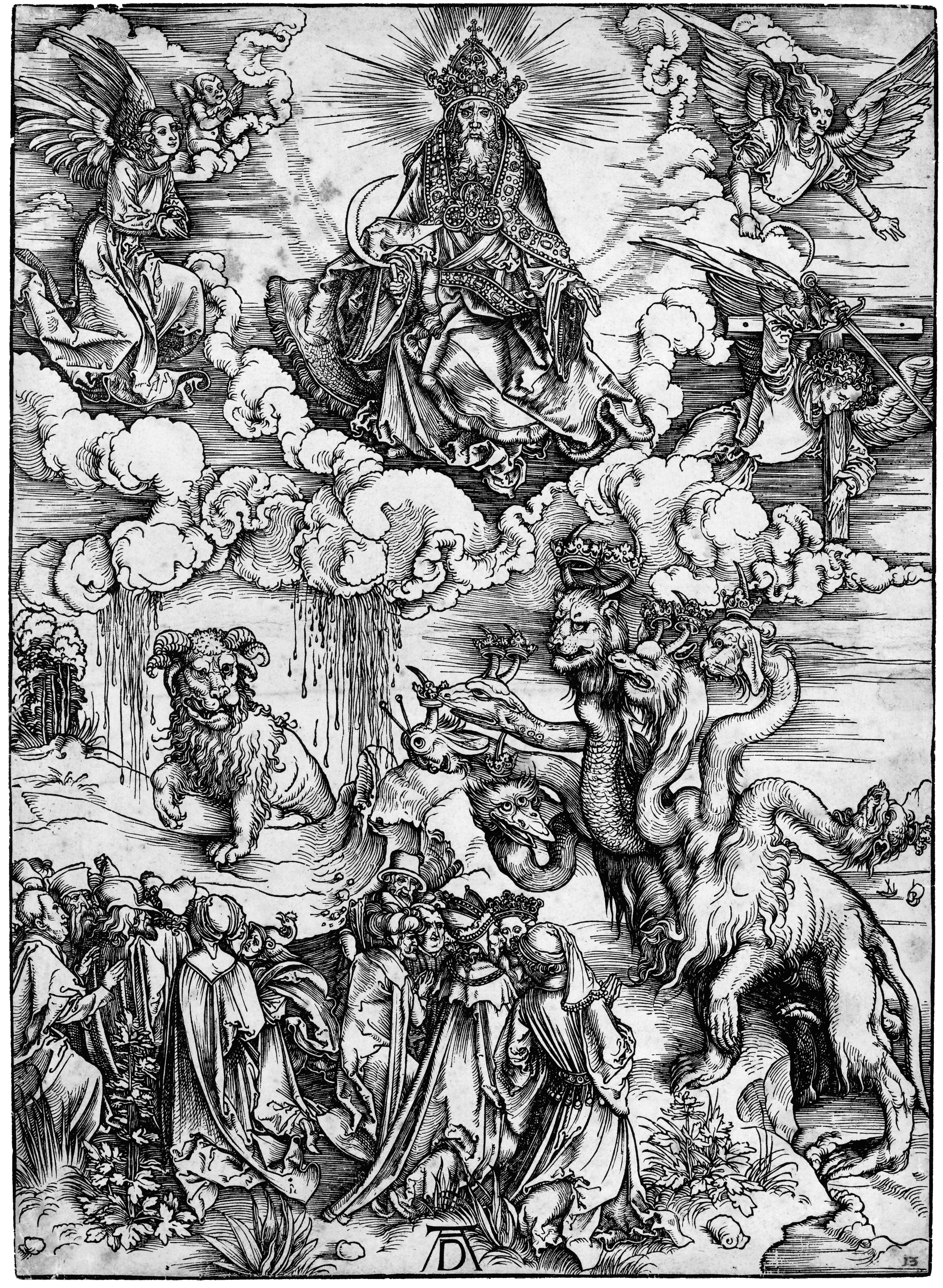
The Revelation of St John: 12. The Sea Monster and the Beast with the Lamb's Horn. A woodcut by Albrecht Dürer

=== Beast from the Sea (The Antichrist) ===
The description of the Sea Beast is found in Revelation chapters thirteen and seventeen. Chapter thirteen gives the fullest description.

It rises out of the sea (Rev 13:1). The four animals of Daniel 7 also arise from the sea, explained as four kingdoms arising from the earth (Dan 7:3, 17). In Revelation, the "many waters" on which the harlot sits are explained as "peoples and multitudes and nations and tongues" (Rev 17:1, 15).

The beast has seven heads and ten horns (Rev 13:1), equal to the total number of heads and horns in Daniel 7, indicating some relationship.

The beast has crowns on its horns (Rev 13:1).

The beast "was like a leopard, and his feet were like those of a bear, and his mouth like the mouth of a lion" (Rev 13:2). These are the first three animals in Daniel 7, but in reverse order.

"The dragon gave him his power and his throne and great authority" (Rev 13:2).

"I saw one of his heads as if it had been slain" (Rev 13:3). Revelation 17 describes these heads as representing kings and also mountains on which the woman sits.

The beast in Revelation 17 also suffers a severe fatal wound to the head.

"His fatal wound was healed" (Rev 13:3).

"The whole earth was amazed and followed after the beast" (Rev 13:4). Similarly, in Revelation 17, when the beast comes out of the abyss, "those who dwell on the earth... will wonder when they see the beast" (Rev 13:8; 17:8).

"They worshiped the dragon because he gave his authority to the beast; and they worshiped the beast" (Rev 13:4). "Worship" is perhaps the key word in Revelation 13. It appears many times. In Revelation 14, three angels warn the world to worship the Creator alone. The end-time may be understood as a crisis over who to worship.

Apart from giving authority to the Sea Beast, the Dragon does nothing in Revelation 13. All the work is done by the Sea Beast, the Earth Beast, and the Image of the Beast. So, the people worship the Beast directly but the Dragon only indirectly.

"There was given to him — a mouth speaking arrogant words and blasphemies... he opened his mouth in blasphemies against God, to blaspheme His name and His tabernacle" (Rev 13:5-6). The 11th horn of Daniel 7 similarly has "a mouth uttering great boasts." "He will speak out against the Most High." (Dan 7:20, 25)

"Authority to act for forty-two months was given to him" (Rev 13:5). He received authority over "the saints" and over all people (Rev 13:7). The 11th horn of Daniel 7 will "wear down the saints of the Highest One ... and they will be given into his hand for a time, times, and half a time" (Dan 7:25). It has been argued that the 42 months are equal to the "time, times, and half a time." (3½ times = 3½ years = 42 months)

=== Beast from the Earth (The False Prophet) ===
The Beast from the Earth is primarily described in Revelation chapter thirteen. This beast comes out of the earth whose overall appearance is not described, other than having "two horns like a lamb", and speaking "like a dragon". His purpose is to promote the authority of the Sea Beast with the ability to perform great signs, even making fire come down out of Heaven. This Earth Beast is also called the false prophet. He speaks like a dragon commanding the people of the Earth to make an image "to" the beast that was wounded by a sword (the Sea Beast). It is declared that anyone who does not worship the Sea Beast or its image would be killed. This lamb-horned beast from the earth also causes all people to receive the mark of the beast "in their right hand or in their forehead."

=== The Scarlet Beast ===
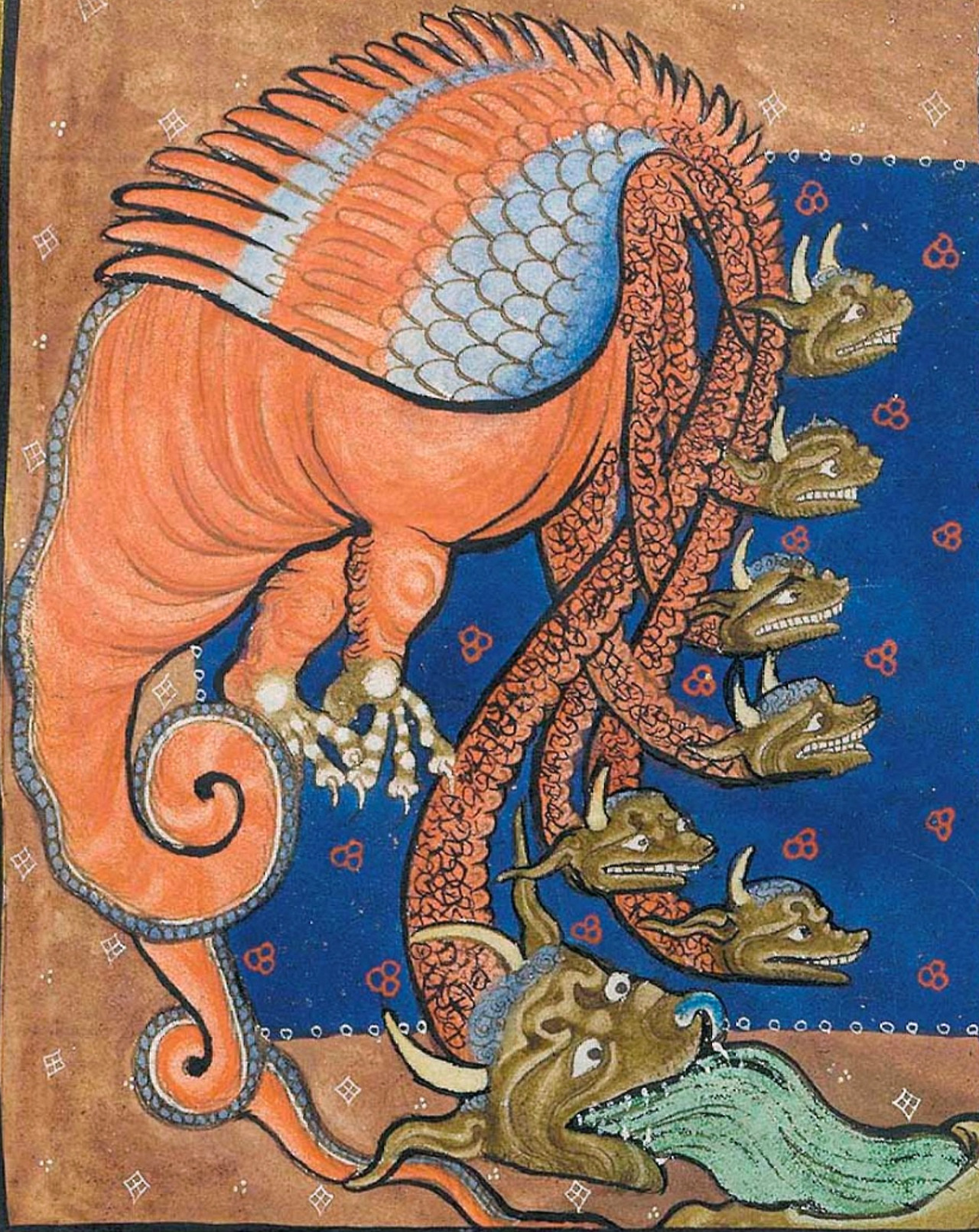
Seven heads and ten horns in the Trinity Apocalypse

Revelation 17 mentions another beast described as "a scarlet coloured beast", although it is most likely the same as the Sea Beast mentioned in Revelation 13.

Just like the Dragon and the Sea Beast, it has seven heads and ten horns (Revelation 17:3), implying that these three are of the same species. Since there are also seven heads and ten horns among the four animals of Daniel 7, and since the animals of Daniel 7 exist until Christ's return, the seven heads and ten horns of the beasts in Revelation imply that they are related to the animals of Daniel 7.

The scarlet beast is shown being ridden by a harlot who "reigns over the kings of the earth", (Revelation 17:18) whereas the beast of the sea is not described as being ridden, and is given "power and great authority." The seven heads represent both seven mountains and seven kings, and the ten horns are ten kings who have not yet received kingdoms. Of the seven kings, five have fallen, one is, the other has not yet come. The beast itself is an eighth king who is of the seven and "was and is not and shall ascend out of the bottomless pit, and go into perdition."

=== Image of the Beast ===
Those who dwell on the earth are deceived into making an image (interpreted as a statue or a Satanic counterfeit to image of God) of the Sea Beast as a means to worship its authority. The false prophet breathes life into the "image of the beast", so that the image becomes alive and is able to speak. It also declares death to anyone who does not worship the authority of the Sea Beast. Those who are killed for not conforming to the authority of the Sea Beast are blessed through the "first resurrection" that allows them to rule in Christ's presence as priests during the one thousand-year reign. The second death has no power over these individuals who were victorious over the beast by not being deceived, even though they lost their lives on Earth by his authority.

=== Mark of the Beast ===
The number of the beast (Koine Greek: Ἀριθμὸς τοῦ θηρίου, Arithmós toû thēríou) is associated with the Beast in chapter 13, verse 18 of the Book of Revelation. In most manuscripts of the New Testament and in English translations of the Bible, the number of the beast is "six hundred sixty-six" or χ̅ξ̅ϛ̅ (in Greek numerals, χ̅ represents 600, ξ̅ represents 60 and ϛ̅ represents 6). Papyrus 115 (which is the oldest preserved manuscript of the Revelation as of 2017), as well as other ancient sources like Codex Ephraemi Rescriptus, give the number of the beast as χιϛ or χιϲ (transliterable in Arabic numerals as "616") (χ̅ι̅ϛ̅), not 666; critical editions of the Greek text, such as the Novum Testamentum Graece, note χιϛ as a variant.

In Roman Numerals, in use when the Book of Revelation was written, the mark of the beast in Revelation 17:9 is rendered DCLXVI 'The Roman numeral for 666, DCLXVI, has exactly one occurrence of all symbols whose value is less than 1000 in decreasing order (D = 500, C = 100, L = 50, X = 10, V = 5, I = 1).'

The seven heads of the beast are described in Revelation as representing seven hills.

Rome was built on seven hills.

The mark of the beast is interpreted differently in the four main views of Christian eschatology.

=== Fate of the False Prophet ===
Heaven opens and a figure on a white horse appears, followed by "the armies which were in heaven".

And out of his mouth goeth a sharp sword, that with it he should smite the nations: and he shall rule them with a rod of iron: and he treadeth the winepress of the fierceness and wrath of Almighty God. And he hath on his vesture and on his thigh a name written, King Of Kings, And Lord Of Lords. And I saw an angel standing in the sun; and he cried with a loud voice, saying to all the fowls that fly in the midst of heaven, Come and gather yourselves together unto the supper of the great God; That ye may eat the flesh of kings, and the flesh of captains, and the flesh of mighty men, and the flesh of horses, and of them that sit on them, and the flesh of all men, both free and bond, both small and great.

The beast and the kings of the earth and their armies gather to prepare for war against them. The beast is taken, along with the false prophet, and they are thrown alive into "the lake of fire" and the rest are killed. In chapter twenty, after the dragon is freed from the abyss and deceives the nations, the dragon is thrown into the lake of fire, where the beast and the false prophet are and will be tormented day and night forever and ever.

== Interpretations ==
=== Preterism ===
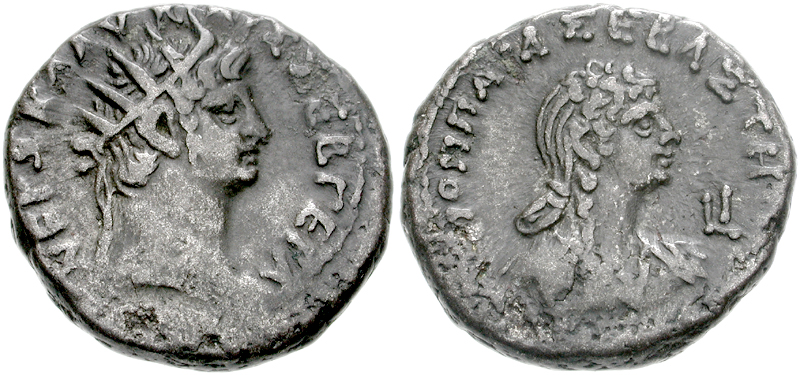
A coin bearing the Greek name and image of Nero, with radiant crown symbolizing the sun

Preterism is a Christian eschatological view that interprets prophecies of the Bible, especially the Books of Daniel and Revelation, by reference to events that had already happened. Preterist academic scholars generally identify the first beast from the sea with the Roman Empire, particularly with Emperor Nero.

The beast from the earth is generally identified with the Roman imperial cult. Sometimes there is a particular identification with a personage such as a chief administrator of Roman rule in Ephesus and Asia Minor. This is probably the provincial governor (or proconsul) who would have overseen the political and religious operations of the area from his capital in Ephesus or the High Priest of the provincial imperial cult. The imperial cult in Ephesus was set up by Domitian in AD 89. (Ephesus is the location of one of the Seven Churches in Asia to whom the Book of Revelation was addressed.)

This interpretation is based upon the angel's explanation of the beast in Revelation 17:7, that the beast's seven heads are seven kings (Revelation 17:10) and that Nero, is the sixth king "who is", who was possibly alive and the emperor reigning at the time John was writing the book. (Note: The consensus among 20th century scholars is that John wrote during the reign of Domitian, around 95 A.D., but that some date it earlier. See Beale (1999).) The five kings who have fallen are seen as Julius, Augustus, Tiberius, Caligula and Claudius; Galba is the one who "has not yet come, but when he does come, he must remain for a little while". (Revelation 17:10). Moreover, Rome was known in antiquity as the city of seven hills (Revelation 17:9) and Revelation was a warning about events that were "shortly" to take place (Revelation 1:1).

In Revelation 13:5–8, the beast was given a mouth speaking in blasphemies against God and his name. Inscriptions have been found in Ephesus in which Nero is called "Almighty God" and "Savior". In verse 4, the beast is worshiped by the world alongside the dragon that gave it authority. Nero and Caligula "abandoned all reserve" in promoting emperor worship—they were the only two who demanded divine honors while still alive. Nero claimed to be the sun-god Apollo.

Revelation 13:7 speaks of the power given to the beast to make war with the saints. Nero was the first of the imperial authorities to persecute Christianity. Tacitus records the scene in Rome when the persecution of Christians (or Chrestians) broke out: "And their death was aggravated with mockeries, insomuch that, wrapped in the hides of wild beasts, they were torn to pieces by dogs, or fastened to crosses to be set on fire, that when the darkness fell they might be burned to illuminate the night."

Revelation 13:5 says that the beast would continue for 42 months. The Neronic persecution was instituted in AD 64 and lasted until his death in June AD 68, which is three and a half years, or 42 months. Nero was even called the beast. Apollonius of Tyana specifically states that Nero was called a beast:

In my travels, which have been wider than ever man yet accomplished, I have seen man, many wild beasts of Arabia and India; but this beast, that is commonly called a Tyrant, I know not how many heads it has, nor if it be crooked of claw, and armed with horrible fangs. ...And of wild beasts you cannot say that they were ever known to eat their own mother, but Nero has gorged himself on this diet.

The manner of Nero's death corresponds with the prophecy of Revelation 13:10: "If anyone is destined for captivity, to captivity he goes; if any one kills with the sword, with the sword he must be killed." According to Tertullian, Nero was the first to assail the Christian sect with the imperial sword. He committed suicide by the sword at age 30.

After Nero's death in AD 68, Rome saw a quick succession of short-lived emperors (Galba, Otho, and Vitellius) and a year of civil wars until Vespasian eventually took control in AD 69. The Roman Empire destabilized so greatly that Tacitus reported: "Many believed the end of the empire was at hand". According to Suetonius, to the surprise of the world, "the empire which for a long time had been unsettled and, as it were, drifting through the usurpation and violent death of three emperors, was at last taken in and given stability by the Flavian family". This may be a reference to the mortal wound on one of the heads of the beast "inflicted by the sword" which was later healed (Revelation 13:3, 13:14). D. K. Wong (2003) wrote that the "healing of the wound" alludes to the so-called Nero Redivivus legend ("revival of Nero" myth). A rumour said that Nero had just disappeared to Parthia, and would one day reappear.

Finally, the readers of Revelation were told to "calculate the number of the beast, for the number is that of a man; and his number is six hundred and sixty-six" (Rev. 13:18). John did not expect his readers "who had understanding" to have any difficulty identifying the beast, since they could simply calculate the meaning of this number: "Neron Kaisar" (Νερων Καισαρ the Greek rendering, documented by archaeological finds), transliterated into Hebrew נרון קסר (Nrwn Qsr). When using standard mispar hechrechi encoding of gematria, adding the corresponding values yields 666, as shown:

| Resh (ר) | Samech (ס) | Qof (ק) | Nun (נ) | Vav (ו) | Resh (ר) | Nun (נ) | Total |
| 200 | 60 | 100 | 50 | 6 | 200 | 50 | 666 |

The variant number 616 found in some manuscripts of the Greek text of Revelation may represent the alternative Hebrew spelling נרו קסר (Nrw Qsr) based on the Latin form "Nero Caesar". The variant probably existed to keep consistent the meaning of Nero as the beast.

| Resh(ר) | Samech (ס) | Qof (ק) | Vav (ו) | Resh (ר) | Nun (נ) | TOTAL |
| 200 | 60 | 100 | 6 | 200 | 50 | 616 |

=== Historicism ===
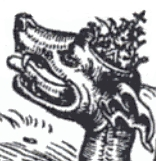
Beast wearing papal tiara from Luther's translation of the New Testament from 1522.

Historicism is a method of interpretation in Christian eschatology which interprets biblical prophecies as actual historical events and identifies symbolic beings with historical persons or societies in the history of the church. This interpretation was favored by the Protestant reformers such as John Wycliff, John Calvin, and Martin Luther, as well as other prominent figures such as Isaac Newton.

According to this interpretation, the beast and false prophet were most commonly identified with the papacy in its political and religious aspects.

The identification with the papacy is a viewpoint echoed by Seventh-day Adventist writers. According to the Seventh-day Adventist Church, the "image to the beast" represents Protestant churches which will form an alliance with the papacy, and the "mark of the beast" refers to a future universal Sunday law. Adventists have interpreted the number of the beast, 666, as corresponding to a Latin title Vicarius Filii Dei of the pope. The number 666 is calculated by using a form of gematria where only the letters which refer to Latin numerals are counted.

| V | I | C | A | R | I | U | S | F | I | L | I | I | D | E | I | TOTAL |
| 5 | 1 | 100 | 0 | 0 | 1 | 5 | 0 | 0 | 1 | 50 | 1 | 1 | 500 | 0 | 1 | 666 |

In 1866, Uriah Smith was the first to propose the interpretation to the Seventh-day Adventist Church. In The United States in the Light of Prophecy he wrote,

The pope wears upon his pontifical crown in jeweled letters, this title: "Vicarius Filii Dei", "Viceregent of the Son of God"; the numerical value of which title is just six hundred and sixty-six. The most plausible supposition we have ever seen on this point is that here we find the number in question. It is the number of the beast, the papacy; it is the number of his name, for he adopts it as his distinctive title; it is the number of a man, for he who bears it is the "man of sin".

Adventist scholar J. N. Andrews also adopted this view. Uriah Smith maintained his interpretation in the various editions of Thoughts on Daniel and the Revelation, which was influential in the church.

Jimmy Akin of Catholic Answers and additional Catholic source Our Sunday Visitor, a Catholic newspaper (see Vicarius Filii Dei), disagree with the above argument because, "although Vicarius Filii Dei adds up to 666, [it] is not a title of the pope".

The beast from the earth has also been interpreted as the Islamic prophet Muhammed, according to some medieval Christians, particularly Pope Innocent III; Saracens and Antipopes, according to other medieval Christians, particularly Joachim of Fiore; and the government of the United States of America (this is the view of the Seventh-day Adventist Church). This interpretation was introduced by Adventist pioneer John Nevins Andrews.

Samuele Bacchiocchi, an Adventist scholar, has noted that Seventh-day Adventist teaching is moving away from historicism towards a more symbolic interpretation of the mark of the beast.

The Historicist interpretation has fallen out of favor with modern commentaries on Revelation, partially because it has failed to form a consensus on how the outline of the book of Revelation corresponds with history.

=== Idealism ===
Idealism, also known as the allegorical or symbolic approach, is an interpretation of the book of Revelation that sees the imagery of the book as non-literal symbols. This is a common viewpoint of modern Christian scholars such as Gregory Beale in his New International Greek Testament Commentary on the Book of Revelation. Some Idealist interpretations identify none of the book's symbols with particular historical events while some idealists like Beale take a more eclectic approach which see that the book portrays events throughout history while also predicting some future events such as the return of Christ.

In this view, the beast from the sea is interpreted as the state or any human kingdom that is in opposition to God. This would include the Roman Empire but would broadly apply to all empires. Scholars take their cue from the parallels between Revelation 13 and Daniel 7, noting that in Daniel 7:17 that the beasts are revealed as kingdoms. Therefore, given that the beast of Revelation 13 is a composite of the beasts of Daniel, one should similarly interpret this beast as a kingdom, more specifically a composite of all kingdoms. Similarly, in some idealist circles, it is suggested that the beast represents different social injustices, such as exploitation of workers, wealth, the elite, commerce, materialism, and imperialism. Various Christian anarchists, such as Jacques Ellul, have associated the State and political power as the beast.

The Idealist interpretation of the beast from the earth is that it represents religious, cultural and economic powers within society which work to compel people to give their allegiance to the state or governmental powers. This was first expressed in the imperial cult of Rome but finds expression at all times of history. In his commentary, Michael Wilcock says "Religion, indeed is too narrow an identification of the second beast. He is, in modern parlance, the ideology – whether religious, philosophical, or political which 'gives breath to' any human social structure organized independently of God."

The Idealist perspective on the number of the beast rejects gematria, envisioning the number not as a code to be broken, but a symbol to be understood. Because there are so many names that can come to 666 and that most systems require converting names to other languages or adding titles when convenient, there is no consensus. Given that numbers are used figuratively throughout the book of Revelation, idealists interpret this number figuratively as well. The common suggestion is that because seven is a number of completeness and is associated with the divine, that six is incomplete and the three sixes mean completely incomplete. Other scholars focus not on incompleteness but on the beast's ability to imitate perfection, that is, to appear authentic. Since the number six is one short of the perfect number seven, the beast's number bears "most of the hallmarks of truth, and so it can easily deceive".

The Idealist interpretation in which the beast finds expression in the socio-cultural, economic and political arena of all human activities since the existence of man best describes the scriptural perspective of the beast. This position was annunciated by Chike Udolisa is his book. In this perspective, the image of the four kingdoms that were to rule the world as shown to Nebuchadnezzar were equated to the four beasts revealed to Daniel, and to the seven-headed beast revealed to John. The records of Revelation 17:2–3 and Revelation 13:1 show this beast to represent the kings of the earth. Furthermore, the revelation in Daniel 7 of four beasts comprising a lion, bear and leopard also correlates with the seven-headed beast as shown to John in Revelation 13:2 having the same features of the lion, bear and leopard. Thus the beast represents the kingdoms that will bear rule over the world from Adam until the second coming of Christ. While in the spirit, this beast is seen as a personality as in Revelation 19:20, in the physical he is represented at different ages throughout the period of human existence as different kingdoms. The importance of this interpretation is that as the Whore of Babylon is seen to be riding this beast, the beast is the seat of operation of the whore from where she is expressed, and by whom her dominion is exercised. This corresponds to Revelation 13 where the power exercised by this beast was completely that of the dragon. This brings to light the scriptural fact that the governments of the nations are puppets in the hands of this beast, consistent with the truth that the whole world system is under the dragon, the god of this world.

St. Augustine of Hippo takes a more Idealist interpretation when he writes:

And what this beast is, though it requires a more careful investigation, yet it is not inconsistent with the true faith to understand it of the ungodly city itself, and the community of unbelievers set in opposition to the faithful people and the city of God. For to this beast belong not only the avowed enemies of the name of Christ and His most glorious city, but also the tares which are to be gathered out of His kingdom, the Church, in the end of the world.

=== Futurism ===
Futurism is a Christian eschatological view that interprets portions of the Book of Revelation and the Book of Daniel as future events in a literal, physical, apocalyptic, and global context. This viewpoint is adopted by Dispensationalism and has become deeply rooted in American Evangelical churches.

Futurism interprets the beast from the sea to represent a revived Roman empire that will oppose Christians in the last days. Futurists would admit the symbolic ties to Rome and would interpret that the recovery from the fatal head wound would refer to a revival of this empire in the last days. It is usually understood that this revived empire will be ruled by the Antichrist, though some refer to the beast as the Antichrist. Futurist scholars, such as John Walvoord, identify this beast not as the individual ruler but as the revived Roman empire, noting that the reference to Rome's seven hills and the connection to the beasts in Daniel seven indicate that the beast represents a kingdom.

Futurism interprets the beast from the earth, or false prophet, as the future head of the apostate church or as a future expression of false religion in general.

Interpretation of the mark or number of the beast is similar to the idealist view suggesting that the number six refers to imperfection, falling short of the divine number seven.

=== Alternative views ===
- The Bahá'í Faith identifies the Beast to be the Umayyad Caliphate, who waged spiritual war against the "two witnesses," understood to be Muhammad, the founder of Islam, and Ali.
- Aleister Crowley claimed that he was the Beast prophesied in Revelation and used the name Τὸ Μέγα Θηρίον (To Méga Thēríon, sometimes shortened to just Therion), Greek for "The Great Beast", which adds up to 666 by isopsephy, the Greek form of gematria.
- During the New Deal, some ministers identified the Congress of Industrial Organizations as a "Sign of the Beast". Outside of black churches, 20th-century evangelicalism in America tended to regard labor unions as the mark of the beast, although evangelicals originally worked to eliminate class distinctions.
- Some identify the Beast with a supercomputer in Brussels, Belgium. However, author Joe Musser attributes the origin of this urban legend to his 1970 novel Behold, a Pale Horse and to an ad campaign promoting the movie The Rapture which featured the Brussels-based supercomputer. This ad campaign consisted of make-believe newspapers containing "reports" on various aspects of the movie. Musser speculates that stories subsequently run in an unnamed Pennsylvania newspaper and a 1976 issue of Christian Life magazine were mistakenly based on these ads.
- Various Christian anarchists, such as J. Ellul, have identified the State and political power as the beast in the Book of Revelation.

== See also ==
- Abomination of desolation
- Behemoth, a beast mentioned in the Tanakh (Old Testament)
- Dābbat al-Arḍ in Islamic belief
- Events of Revelation (Chapter 13)
- Lotan, the seven-headed sea serpent or dragon of Ugaritic myths
- Mušḫuššu
- The horse in Nordic mythology
