= Revelation 15 =

- ← chapter 14 chapter 16 →
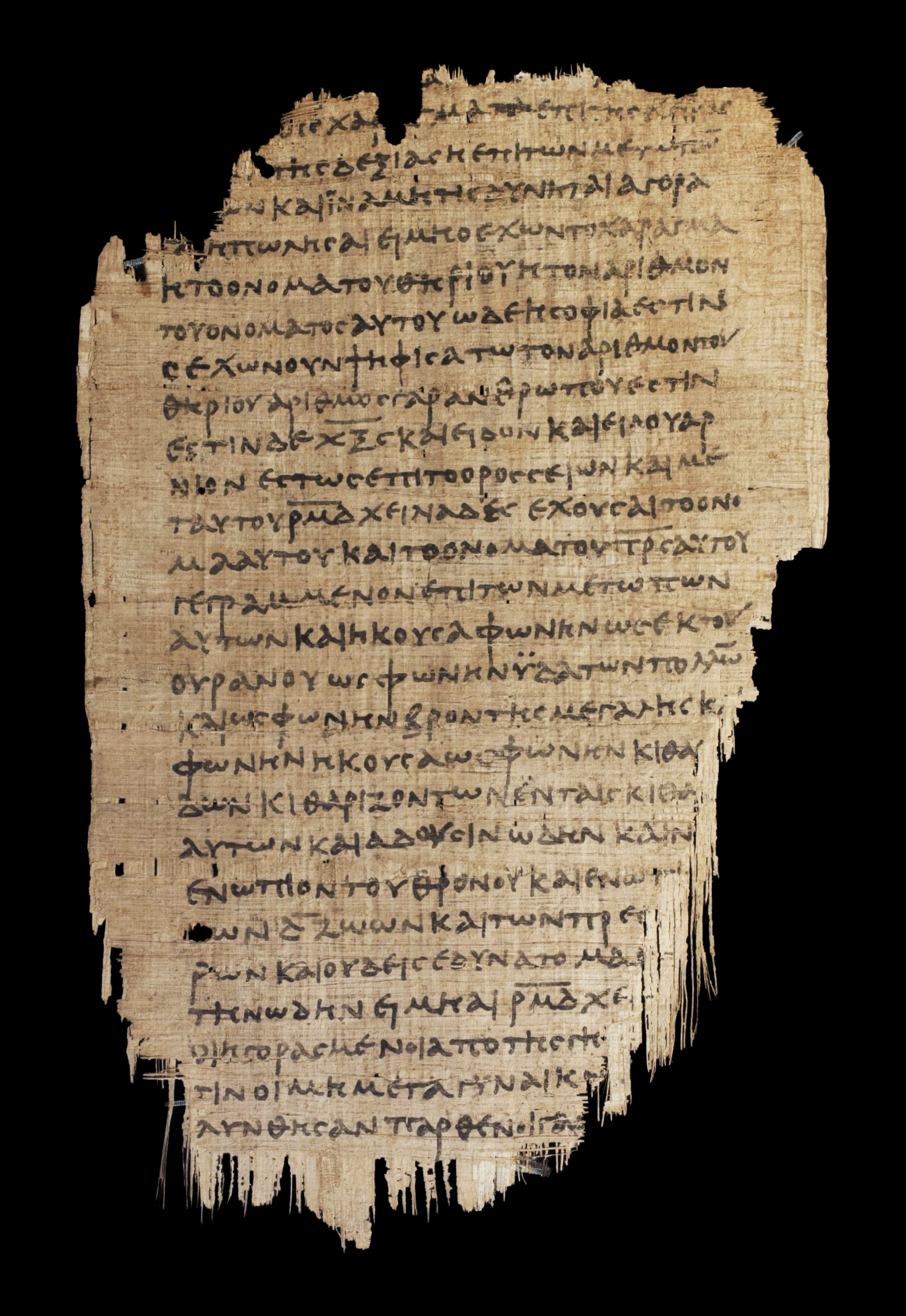
- Revelation 13:16-14:4 on Papyrus 47 from the third century.
- Book: Book of Revelation
- Category: Apocalypse
- Christian Bible part: New Testament
- Order in the Christian part: 27

Revelation 15 is the fifteenth chapter of the Book of Revelation or the Apocalypse of John in the New Testament of the Christian Bible. The book is traditionally attributed to John the Apostle, but the precise identity of the author remains a point of academic debate. This chapter includes the hymn of Moses and the Lamb and introduces the seven angels who appear with seven plagues.

== Text ==
The original text was written in Koine Greek. This chapter is divided into 8 verses; it is the shortest chapter in the book.

=== Textual witnesses ===
Some early manuscripts containing the text of this chapter are among others: (Note: The Book of Revelation is missing from Codex Vaticanus.)

- Papyrus 115 (c. AD 275; extant verses 1, 4–7)
- Papyrus 47 (3rd century; complete)
- Codex Sinaiticus (330-360)
- Codex Alexandrinus (400-440)
- Codex Ephraemi Rescriptus (c. 450; complete)
- Papyrus 43 (6th/7th century; extant verse 8)

=== Old Testament references ===
- Revelation 15:4: Psalm 86:9
- Revelation 15:3: Exodus 15:1; Psalm 145:17
- Revelation 15:4: Jeremiah 10:7

== The Song of the Conquerors (15:1–4) ==
Those who have the victory over the beast, over his image and over his mark, and over the number of his name, sing the song of Moses (as in the Song of the Sea from Exodus 15:1–8) and the song of the Lamb, because "they overcame him by the blood of the Lamb" (Revelation 12:11).

=== Verse 1 ===
Then I saw another sign in heaven, great and marvelous: seven angels having the seven last plagues, for in them the wrath of God is complete.

=== Verse 2 ===
And I saw something like a sea of glass mingled with fire, and those who have the victory over the beast, over his image and over his mark and over the number of his name, standing on the sea of glass, having harps of God.

For "mingled with fire", the New International Version suggests "glowing with fire". A sea of glass, like crystal, has previously appeared in chapter 4, although German theologian Johannes Ebrard suggests they are different seas of glass.

Heinrich Meyer notes that the "harps of God" are "such as serve only for the praise of God".

=== Verses 3–4 ===
^{3} They sing the song of Moses, the servant of God, and the song of the Lamb, saying:

"Great and marvelous are Your works,
Lord God Almighty!
Just and true are Your ways,
O King of the saints!
^{4} Who shall not fear You, O Lord, and glorify Your name?
For You alone are holy.
For all nations shall come and worship before You,
For Your judgments have been manifested."

The wording O King of the saints! (Biblical Greek: ο βασιλευς των αγιων, romanized: o basileus ton hagion) appears in the Textus Receptus, but Meyer argues that this reading is "almost without any testimony" in the early manuscripts. Alternative readings are:

- O King of the nations!
- O King of the ages!
- O King of the heavens!

Verse 4 contains a citation from Psalm 86:9.

== Introduction to the Seven Bowls (15:5–16:1) ==
It is a continuation of 'the anticipatory vision' of Revelation 15:1, which states that these seven plagues are the last ones.

=== Verse 5 ===
The temple of the tabernacle of the testimony in heaven was opened.

Biblical Greek: ο ναος της σκηνης του μαρτυριου εν τω ουρανω, may also be translated as "the temple of the tabernacle of witness in the heaven". Acts 7 records St Stephen's contrast between the tabernacle or tent of witness (Biblical Greek: η σκηνη του μαρτυριου) in the wilderness and the real home of the Most High:

Heaven is My throne,
And earth is My footstool.

This verse echoes Revelation 11:9, showing the relationship with the seventh trumpet, just as the seven trumpets are related to the seventh seal.

=== Verse 6 ===
And out of the temple came the seven angels having the seven plagues, clothed in pure bright linen, and having their chests girded with golden bands.

=== Verses 7-8 ===
^{7}Then one of the four living creatures gave the seven angels seven gold bowls full of the anger of God, who lives forever and ever. ^{8} The temple was filled with smoke from the glory and power of God, and no one could go into the temple until the seven plagues brought by the seven angels had come to an end.

== See also ==
- Book of Daniel
- Jesus Christ
- John's vision of the Son of Man
- Moses
- Names and titles of Jesus in the New Testament
- Seven bowls
- Song of the Sea
- Related Bible parts: Exodus 15, Revelation 4, Revelation 7, Revelation 13, Revelation 14
