= Seven bowls =

Biblical apocalyptic set of plagues

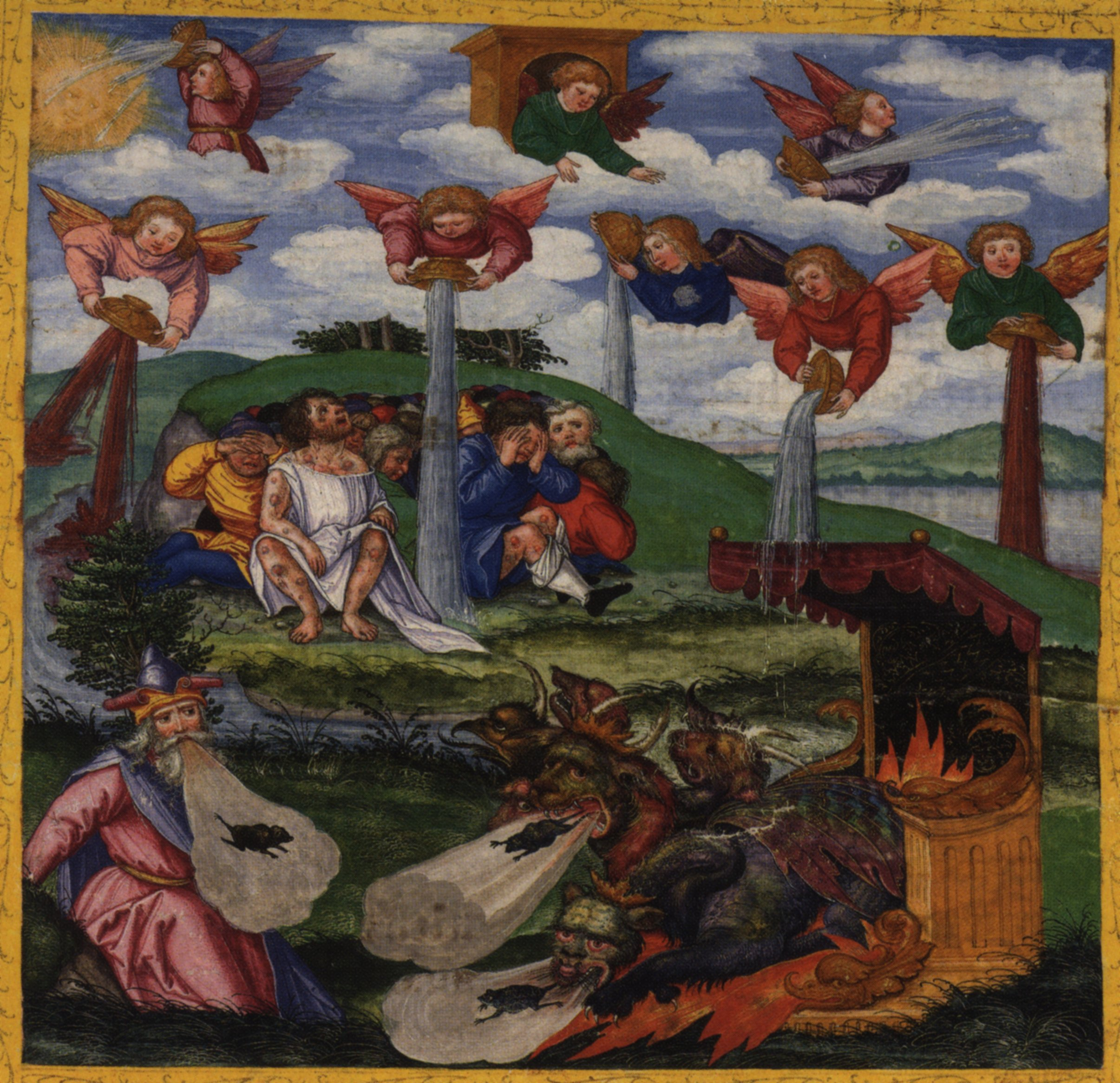
The Giving of the Seven Bowls of Wrath / The First Six Plagues, Revelation 16:1-16. Matthias Gerung, c. 1531

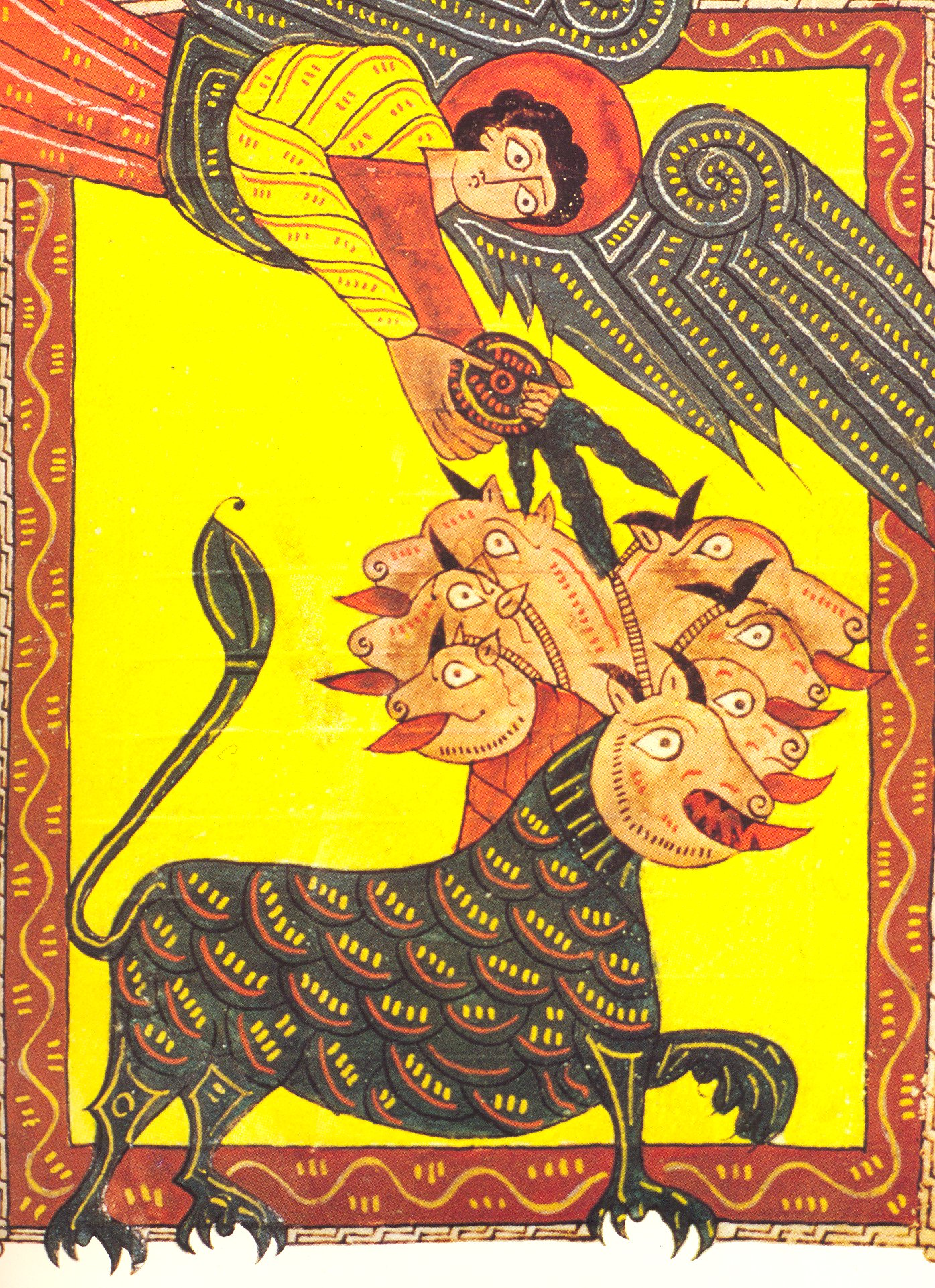
Fifth Bowl, the Seven-headed Beast. Escorial Beatus

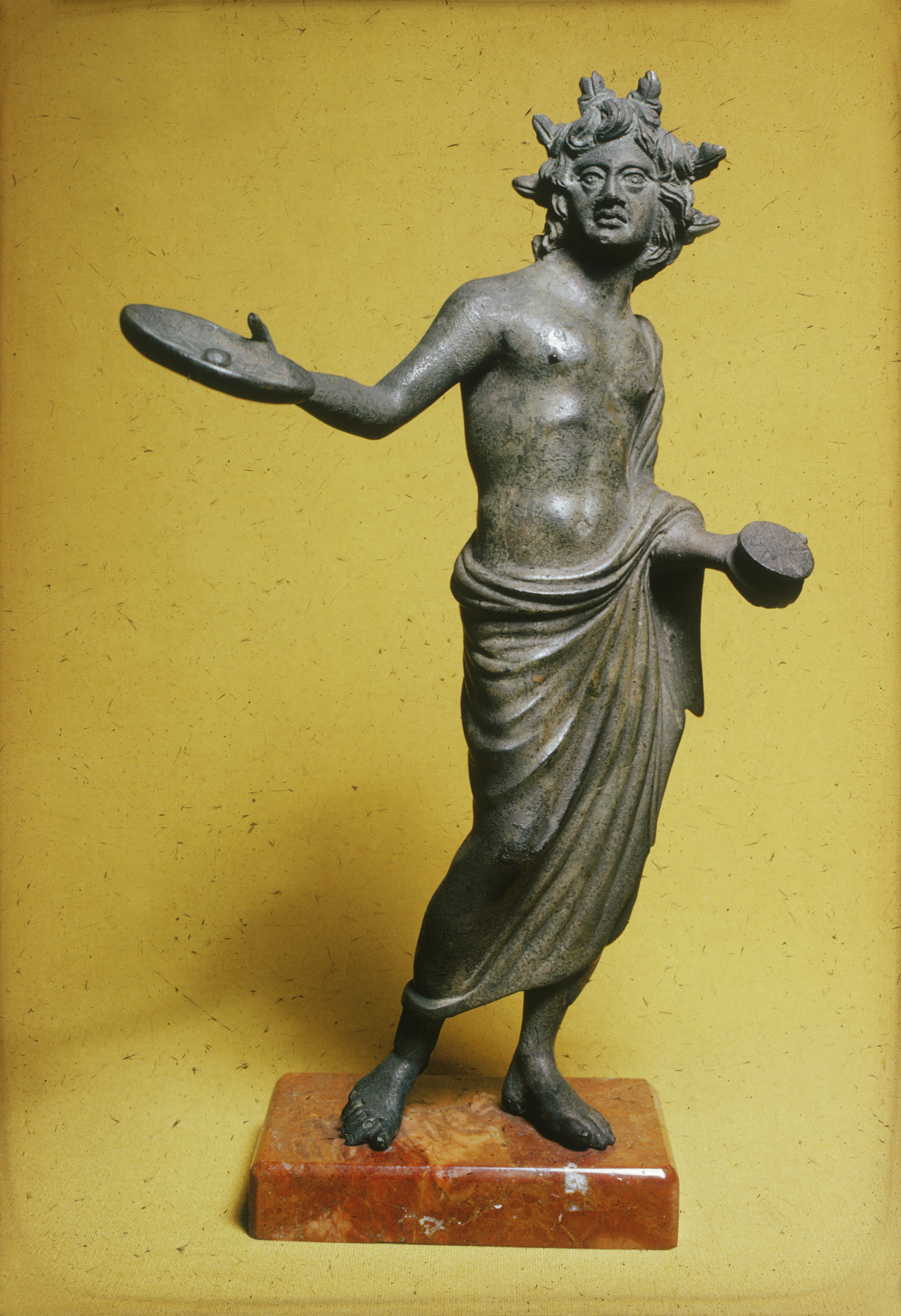
Statue of an Etruscan priest, holding a phialē from which he is to pour a libation; the plagues of Revelation are poured out on the world like offerings.

The seven bowls (Greek: φιάλας, phialas (acc. pl.), nom. sing. φιάλη, phialē; also translated as cups or vials) are a set of plagues mentioned in Revelation 16. They are recorded as apocalyptic events that were seen in the vision of the Revelation of Jesus Christ, by John of Patmos. Seven angels are given seven bowls of God's wrath, each consisting of judgements full of the wrath of God. These seven bowls of God's wrath are poured out on the wicked and the followers of the Antichrist.

== Plagues ==
=== First bowl ===
The first bowl is poured out upon the earth, and causes painful sores to break out upon all those bearing the mark of the beast.

=== Second bowl ===
The second bowl is poured out upon the sea. The sea turns to blood, and every living creature in it dies.

=== Third bowl ===
The third bowl is poured out upon the rivers and springs of water, and they turn to blood. The "angel of the waters" makes a speech in praise of God's justice, which is echoed by a voice from the altar.

=== Fourth bowl ===
The fourth bowl is poured out upon the sun. The sun scorches the people, but only those that curse the name of God and do not repent.

=== Fifth bowl ===
The fifth bowl is poured out upon the throne of the beast. A thick darkness overwhelms the kingdom of the beast, and the wicked still do not repent.

=== Sixth bowl ===
The sixth bowl is poured out upon the river Euphrates. The river dries up to allow "the kings of the east" to cross. Three unclean spirits with the appearance of frogs come, one each, out of the mouths of the dragon, the beast, and the false prophet. These spirits, referred to as unclean (meaning unfit for consumption in Biblical literature), work miracles to gather the nations of the world to battle against the forces of good during the Battle of Armageddon. The vision is interrupted by a voice that says "Behold, I am coming like a thief", and urges believers to stay alert.

Other biblical scholars believe that the great eschatological battle is not described in these verses, having already been won at the time of the crucifixion of Jesus.

=== Seventh bowl ===
The seventh bowl is poured out into the air. A great voice from the throne says: "It is done." There is thunder and lightning, and an earthquake which destroys the cities of the world, and splits "the great city" into three parts. The islands and mountains are destroyed, and hailstones weighing a talent each fall upon the earth. The people continue to curse God.

== See also ==
- Events of Revelation (Chapter 16)
- Seven seals
- Seven trumpets
- Plagues of Egypt
