= Revelation 13 =

- ← chapter 12 chapter 14 →
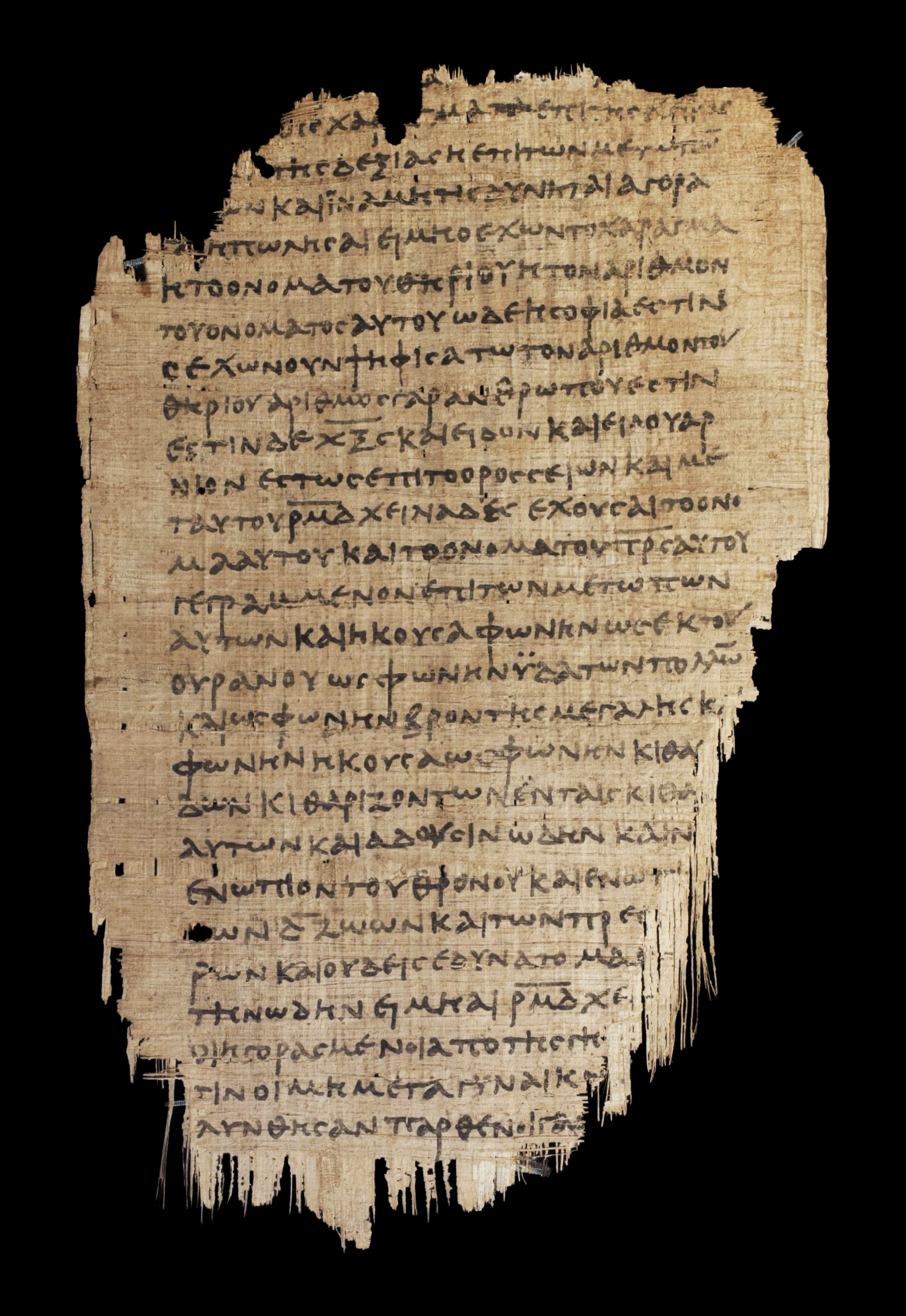
- Revelation 13:16-14:4 on Papyrus 47 from the third century.
- Book: Book of Revelation
- Category: Apocalypse
- Christian Bible part: New Testament
- Order in the Christian part: 27

Revelation 13 is the thirteenth chapter of the Book of Revelation or the Apocalypse of John in the New Testament of the Christian Bible. The book is traditionally attributed to John the Apostle, but the precise identity of the author remains a point of academic debate. The author records visions of two beasts (or monsters) which he saw while "standing on the seashore", the beast from the sea and the beast from the land.

== Text ==
The original text was written in Koine Greek. This chapter is divided into 18 verses.

=== Textual witnesses ===
Some early manuscripts containing the text of this chapter are, among others: (Note: The Book of Revelation is missing from Codex Vaticanus.)

- Papyrus 115 (ca. 275; extant verses 1–3, 6–16, 18)
- Papyrus 47 (3rd century)
- Codex Sinaiticus (330–360)
- Codex Alexandrinus (400–440)
- Codex Ephraemi Rescriptus (ca. 450; complete)

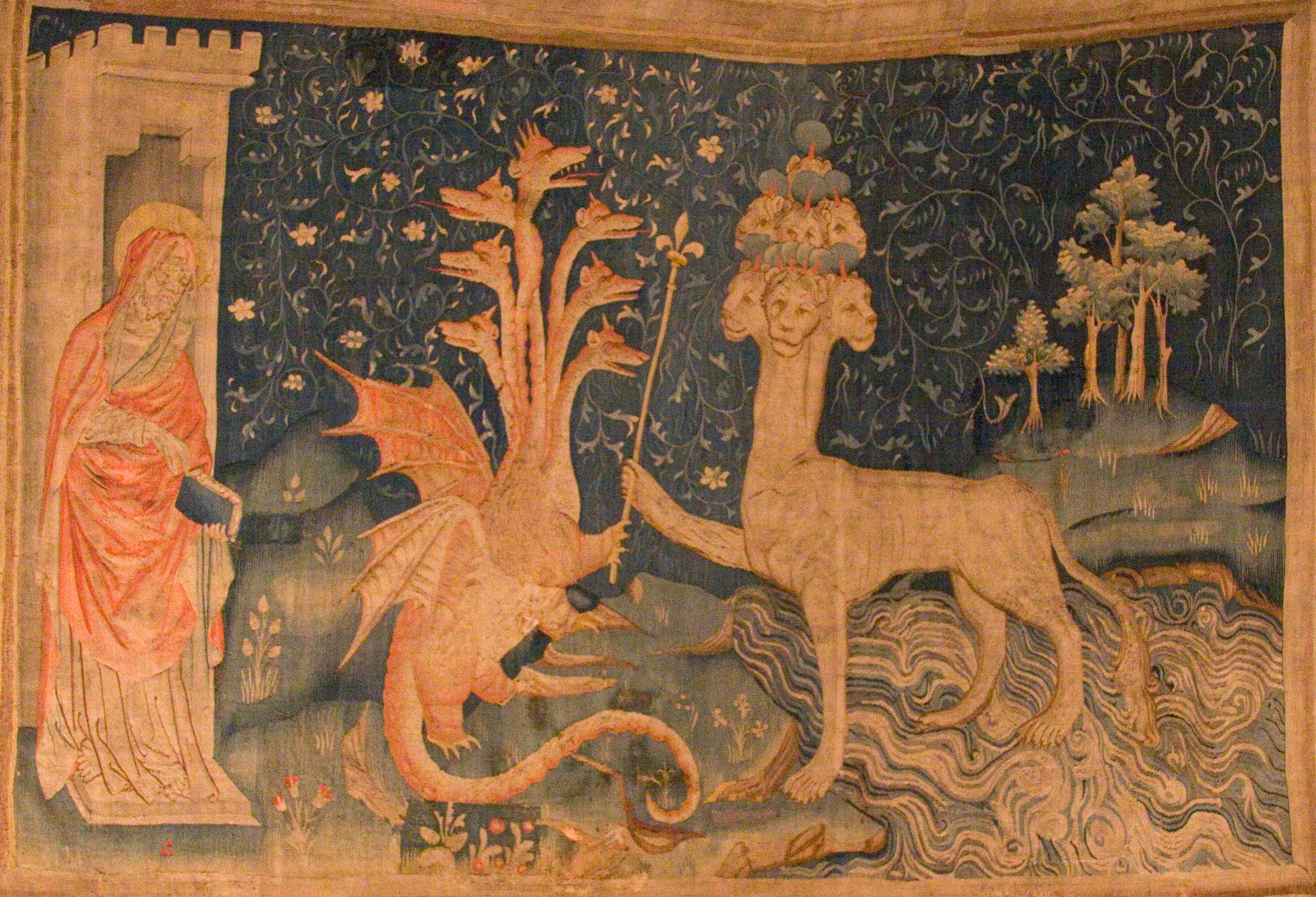
La Bête de la Mer (from the Tapisserie de l'Apocalypse in Angers, France). A medieval tapestry, this detail of which shows John, the Dragon, and the Beast of the Sea.

=== New Testament references ===
- Revelation 13:10: Matthew 26:52

== The beast from the sea (13:1–10) ==
The last verse (verse 18) of the previous chapter connects the appearance of the beast to the dragon who delegates to the beast what power it has.

=== Verse 1 ===
Then I stood on the sand of the sea. And I saw a beast rising up out of the sea, having seven heads and ten horns, and on his horns ten crowns, and on his heads a blasphemous name.

Some manuscript texts read ἐστάθην, estathēn, I stood, while others read ἐστάθη, estathē, he stood, referring to the dragon of Revelation 12:17.

- "The sea": here represents 'the sphere of primeval chaos, the source of evil, an alternative image to the abyss (cf. Revelation 11:7).

=== Verse 2 ===
Now the beast which I saw was like a leopard, his feet were like the feet of a bear, and his mouth like the mouth of a lion. The dragon gave him his power, his throne, and great authority.

The dominant violent characteristic of the beast is modelled on the vision of four beasts in the Book of Daniel, representing four great world empires (Daniel 7:1–8).

=== Verse 5 ===
And he was given a mouth speaking great things and blasphemies, and he was given authority to continue for forty-two months. (Note: In some translations, the authority is to make war.)

The language of verse 5 reflects Daniel 7:6, 8, 25. Although the beast's power is given by the dragon (verse 2), it can only be exercised by God's permission (verse 5).

== The beast from the land (13:11–18) ==
This is the second beast, which also called the "false prophet" (Revelation 16:13; 19:20; 20:10), 'represents the priesthood of the imperial cult, which included prominent members of the elite of the cities'.

=== Verse 11 ===
Then I saw another beast coming up out of the earth, and he had two horns like a lamb and spoke like a dragon.

- "Spoke like a dragon": speaking arrogantly like the devil himself 'as if he was above all' or even 'as if he was God himself' (Luke 4:6).

=== Verses 16–17 ===
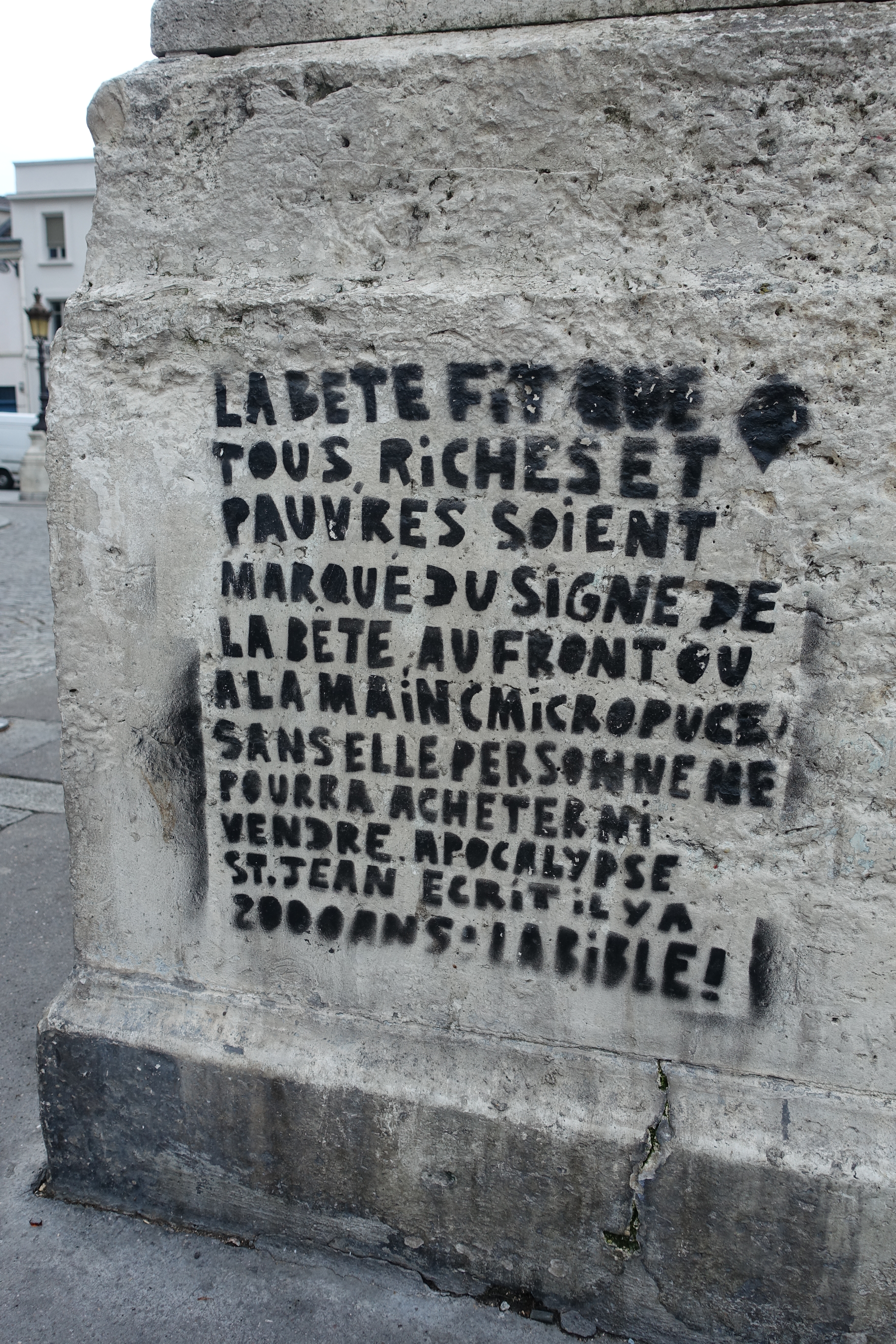
Graffito in Paris quoting Revelation 13:16, associating it with microchips.

^{16} He causes all, both small and great, both rich and poor, both free and slave, to receive a mark on their right hand or on their forehead, ^{17} so that no one may buy or sell, except he who has the mark or the name of the beast or the number of his name.

The mark of the beast seems to be 'a parody of God's seal of ownership on the foreheads of faithful Christians' (7:3; 14:1). The reference to "buying and selling" may reflect the fact that 'it was particularly in order to participate in the business life of the cities that Christians were tempted to compromise with idolatry'.

=== Verse 18 ===
Here is wisdom. Let him who has understanding calculate the number of the beast, for it is the number of a man: His number is 666.

The reference that "the number of the beast" is the same as "the number of a person" leads to many interpretations, because the Greek or Hebrew letters also functioned as numbers, so it was possible to "add up the numerical value of a word"—a practice known as gematria. The Greek word for "beast" (therion) or "Nero(n) Caesar" when transliterated into Hebrew letters has the total value of 666, but the 'verbal link' to Revelation 17:9 indicates more significance of the number (which will be developed further in chapter 17). The number 666 is unusual for being a triangular number (that is, the sum of all numbers from 1 to 36), and also a doubly triangular number (because 36 is the sum of all numbers up to 8) and the eighth such number (in the series of 1, 6, 21, 55, 120, 231, 406, 666). Nero is also revealed to be "the eighth" in power. At least one manuscript reads 616.

== See also ==
- Jesus Christ
- John's vision of the Son of Man
- Names and titles of Jesus in the New Testament
- Number of the beast
- The Beast
- Related Bible parts: Revelation 5, Revelation 6, Revelation 7, Revelation 8, Revelation 9, Revelation 11, Revelation 12

== Sources ==
- Bauckham, Richard (2007). "81. Revelation". In Barton, John; Muddiman, John (eds.). The Oxford Bible Commentary (first (paperback) ed.). Oxford University Press. pp. 1287–1306. ISBN 978-0199277186.
