= Revelation 14 =

- ← chapter 13 chapter 15 →
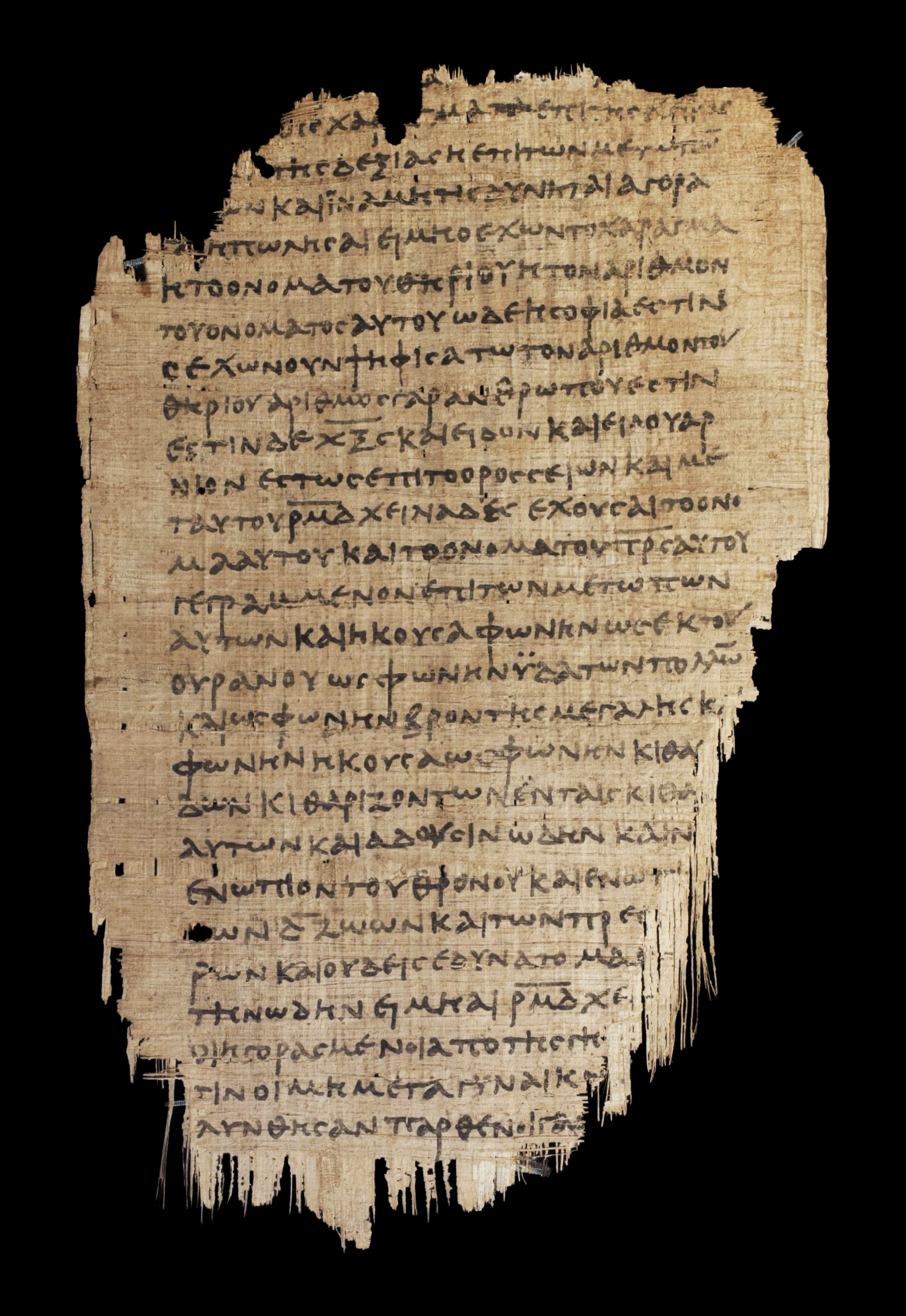
- Revelation 13:16-14:4 on Papyrus 47 from the third century.
- Book: Book of Revelation
- Category: Apocalypse
- Christian Bible part: New Testament
- Order in the Christian part: 27

Revelation 14 is the fourteenth chapter of the Book of Revelation or the Apocalypse of John in the New Testament of the Christian Bible. The book is traditionally attributed to John the Apostle, but the precise identity of the author remains a point of academic debate. This chapter contains the accounts of the lamb with 144,000 followers on Mount Zion, the three angelic messages and the voice from heaven, as well as the harvest of the earth in a winepress and the vintage of the earth. The Three Angels' messages in verses 6 to 12 form a central feature of the teaching and mission of the Seventh-day Adventist Church: "Make disciples of Jesus Christ who live as His loving witnesses and proclaim to all people the everlasting gospel of the Three Angels’ Messages in preparation for His soon return".

== Text ==
The original text was written in Koine Greek. This chapter is divided into 20 verses.

=== Textual witnesses ===
Some early manuscripts containing this chapter are among others: (Note: The Book of Revelation is missing from Codex Vaticanus.)

- Papyrus 115 (ca. AD 275; extant verses 1-3, 5-7, 10-11, 14-15, 18-20)
- Papyrus 47 (3rd century; complete)
- Codex Sinaiticus (330-360)
- Codex Alexandrinus (400-440)
- Codex Ephraemi Rescriptus (ca. 450; complete)

=== Old Testament references ===
- Revelation 14:7: Psalm 146:5
- Revelation 14:8: Jeremiah 51:8 (and also REvelation 18:2)
- Revelation 14:15: Joel 3:13

=== New Testament references ===
- Revelation 14:7: Acts 14:15

== The Lamb and the 144,000 (14:1–5) ==
This part describes the army of the Lamb, ready for holy battle against the beast, consisting of adult males which 'keep themselves free of the ritual defilement incurred by sex (1 Samuel 21:5–6)'.

=== Verse 1 ===
Then I looked, and behold, a Lamb standing on Mount Zion, and with Him one hundred and forty-four thousand, having His Father’s name written on their foreheads.

Translated as "a lamb" in the King James and New King James versions, but as "the lamb" in many other translations. This lamb is, "of course, the same as the lamb seen in chapter 5", but there the lamb looked "as if it had been slain", whereas here it is standing triumphant on Mount Zion: "probably the earthly one, [because] the heavenly Jerusalem of chapter 21 has not yet appeared".

The King James Version states that the 144,000 had "his Father's name" written on their foreheads but the majority of English translations refer to "his name and his Father’s name". This reading (Biblical Greek: τὸ ὄνομα αὐτοῦ καὶ τὸ ὅνομα τοῦ Πατρὸς αὐτοῦ, romanized: to onomo autou kai to onoma tou patros autou) is supported by Codex Sinaiticus, Codex Alexandrinus and Codex Epraemi Rescriptus as well as most cursives and the writings of the early Fathers of the Church.

=== Verse 2 ===
I heard a voice from heaven, like the voice of many waters, and like the voice of loud thunder. And I heard the sound of harpists playing their harps.

Johann Bengel emphasises that the same voice was heard, "first as of many waters and of great thundering, and next as of harpers".

=== Verse 3 ===
They sang as it were a new song before the throne, before the four living creatures, and the elders; and no one could learn that song except the hundred and forty-four thousand who were redeemed from the earth.

- "A new song": compare to Revelation 5:9.

== Three Angelic Messages and a Voice from Heaven (14:6–13) ==
The angels in this section 'symbolize the effect on the nations of the confrontation of the forces of the beast and the Lamb', and in contrast to the eagle in Revelation 8:13, 'their messages are positive'.

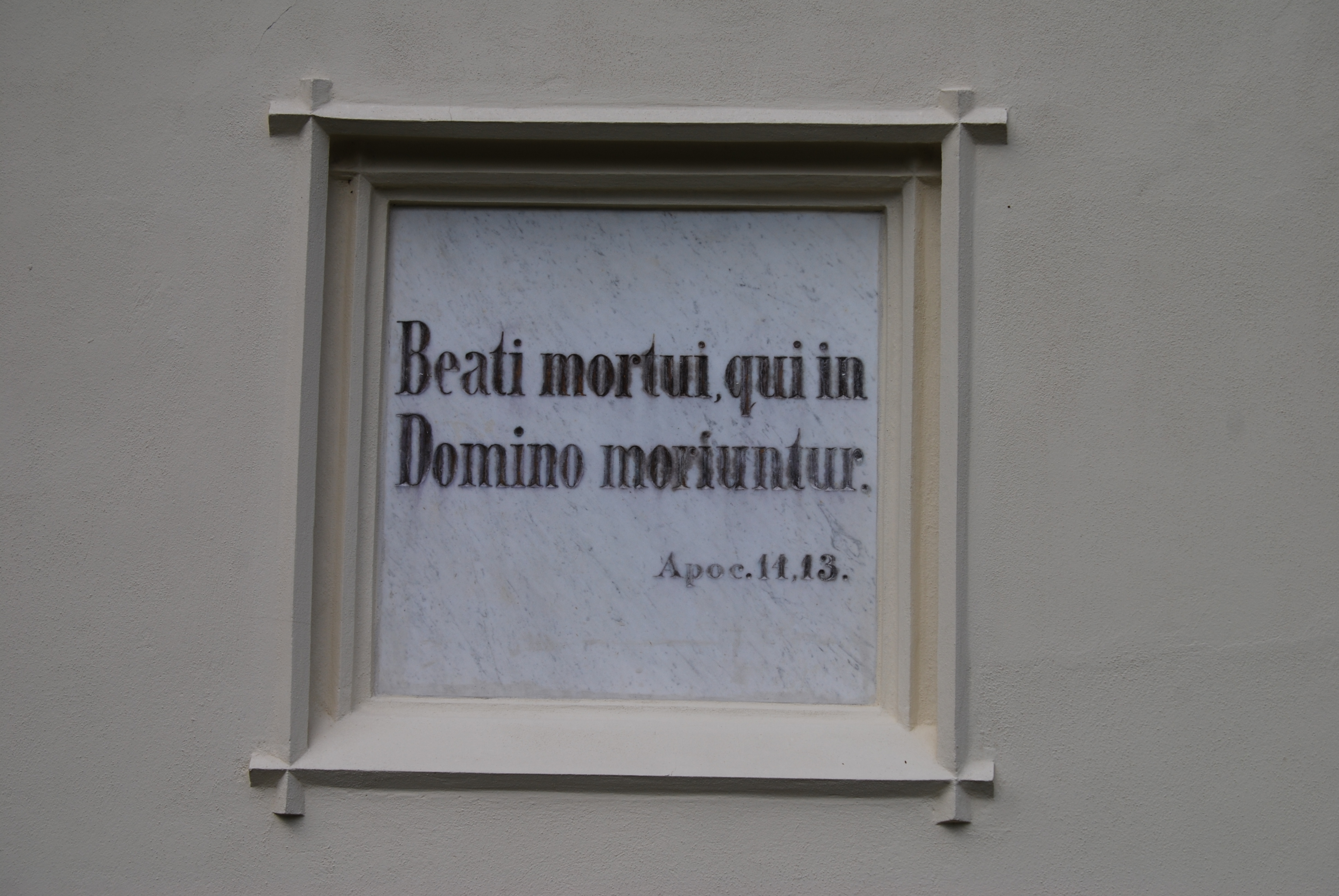
Church in Orlík nad Vltavou, Czech Republic quoting Revelation 14:13 — "Blessed are the dead who die in the Lord."

=== Verse 6 ===
Then I saw another angel flying in the midst of heaven, having the everlasting gospel to preach to those who dwell on the earth—to every nation, tribe, tongue, and people—

- "Another angel": the angel who is called "another" is different from "the voice" heard in Revelation 14:2, although this angel is the first in appearance with respect to the following angels (Revelation 14:8,9).

=== Verse 7 ===
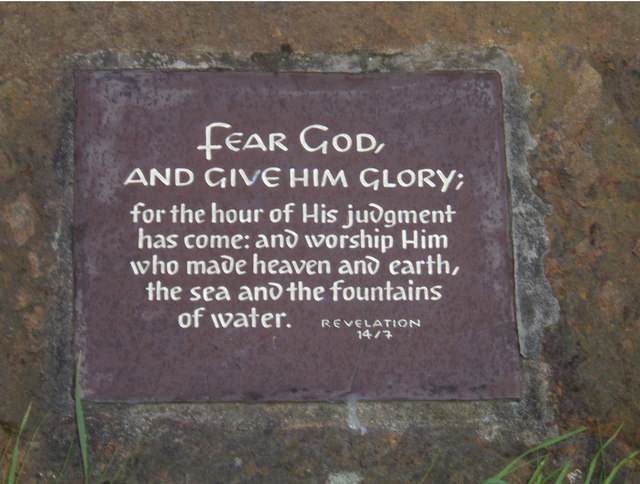
A text from Revelation 14:7 on a metal plaque set in a stone boulder near the parking area and viewpoint on Hawksworth Road north of Baildon (photographed in 2006).

Saying with a loud voice, Fear God, and give glory to him; for the hour of his judgment is come: and worship him that made heaven, and earth, and the sea, and the fountains of waters.

- "A loud voice": or "great voice", is 'characteristic of all the heavenly utterances' (Revelation 14:2; Revelation 11:12,15, etc.).

=== Verse 8 ===
And another angel followed, saying,

“Babylon is fallen, is fallen, that great city, because she has made all nations drink of the wine of the wrath of her fornication.”

Cross reference: Isaiah 21:9, Revelation 18:2

== The Harvest of the Earth and the Vintage of the Earth (14:14–20) ==
Two images at the end of this chapter are two different forms (cf. Joel 3:13) of 'the traditional eschatological image of harvest': the "grain harvest" (verses 14–16) and the "vintage" (verses 17–20), to follow the messages that the angels have given for the nations of the opportunity to respond to the witness of the martyrs in repentance (14:7) or to face the judgement of God (verses 9–11). Verse 20 says: |quote= And the winepress was trodden without the city, and blood came out of the winepress, even unto the horse bridles, by the space of a thousand and six hundred furlongs. (KJV)

And from that it can be estimated how many people will be killed by Jesus and the angel.

It's a simple calculation. A furlong is 201 meters, so 1600 furlongs is about 320 kilometers, and a horse's bridle is 1.5 meters high or so. If we take the bloodbath to be circular with a diameter of 320 kilometers, then the total volume is about 1.2 x 10^14 liters. And since an adult has about 5 liters of blood, that gives us 2.4 x 10^13 (24 trillion) people.

== See also ==
- 144000 (number)
- Book of Daniel
- Jesus Christ
- John's vision of the Son of Man
- Names and titles of Jesus in the New Testament
- Three Angels' Messages
- Related Bible parts: Revelation 4, Revelation 6, Revelation 7, Revelation 11

== Sources ==
- Bauckham, Richard (2007). "81. Revelation". In Barton, John; Muddiman, John (eds.). The Oxford Bible Commentary (first (paperback) ed.). Oxford University Press. pp. 1287–1306. ISBN 978-0199277186.
