= Revelation 12 =

- ← chapter 11 chapter 13 →
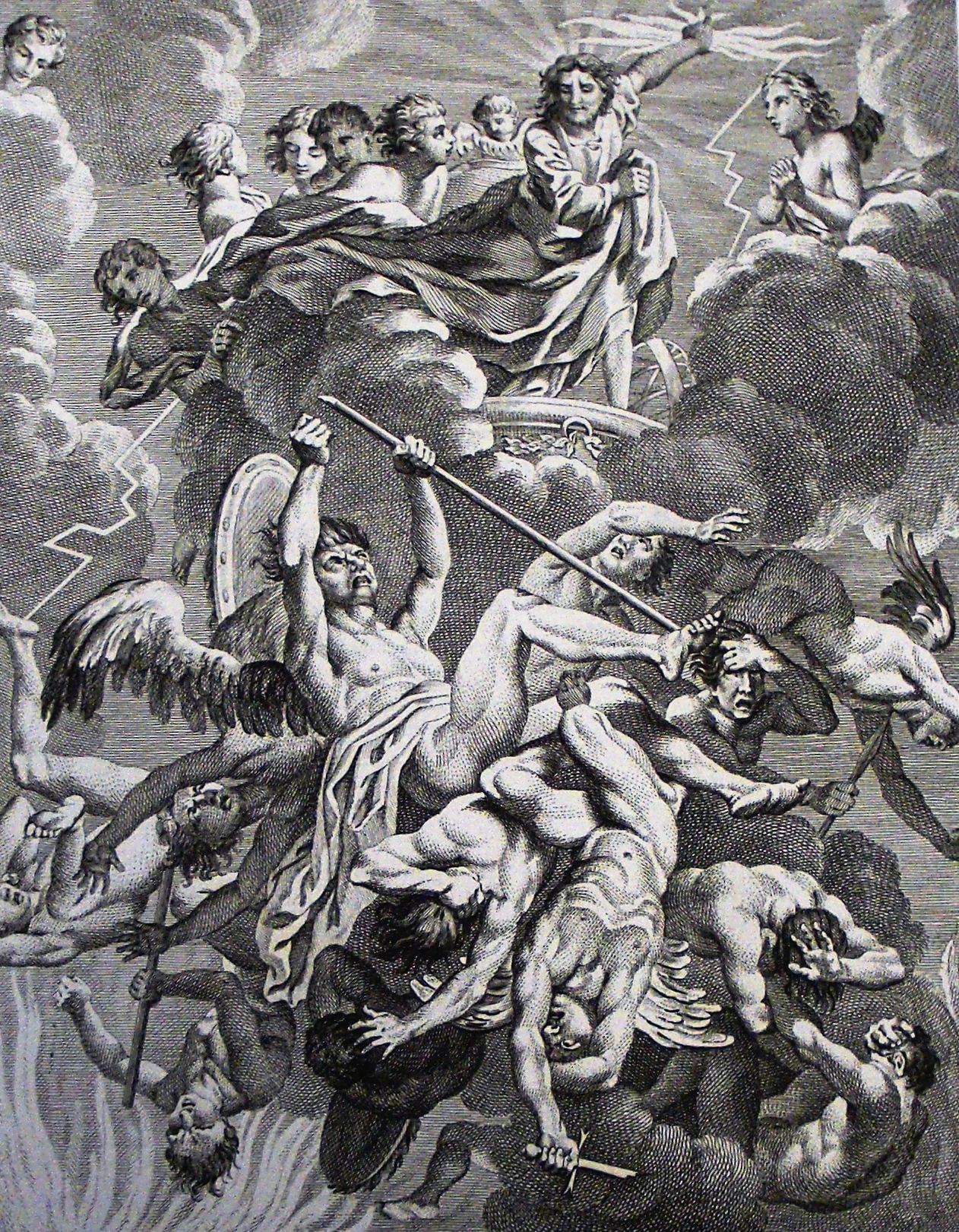
- Apocalypse 19. Michael and the angel. Revelation 12:7-9. Scheits. Phillip Medhurst Collection
- Book: Book of Revelation
- Category: Apocalypse
- Christian Bible part: New Testament
- Order in the Christian part: 27

Revelation 12 is the twelfth chapter of the Book of Revelation or the Apocalypse of John in the New Testament of the Christian Bible. The book is traditionally attributed to John the Apostle, but the precise identity of the author remains a point of academic debate. This chapter contains the accounts about the woman, the dragon, and the child, followed by the war between Michael and the dragon, then the appearance of the monster from the sea. William Robertson Nicoll, a Scottish Free Church minister, suggests that in this chapter the writer has created a Christianised version of a Jewish source which "described the birth of the Messiah in terms borrowed from ... cosmological myths [such as] that of the conflict between the sun-god and the dragon of darkness and the deep".

While scholars have said the passages correspond to the contemporary Greco-Roman combat legends involving dragons, David Barr argued there are some distinctions between the Python myths known during the 1st and 2nd Century AD and Revelations. According to Barr, the Egyptian conflict of Set-Typhon who pursues the goddess Isis, is said to fit better, as the chaos creature is consistently depicted as a red animal, and attacks heaven casting down various stars and constellations.

== Text ==
The original text was written in Koine Greek. This chapter is divided into 17 verses. The Vulgate version has 18 verses.

=== Textual witnesses ===
Some early manuscripts containing the text of this chapter are among others: (Note: The Book of Revelation is missing from Codex Vaticanus.)

- Papyrus 115 (ca. AD 275; extant verses 1-5, 8-10, 12-17)
- Papyrus 47 (3rd century)
- Codex Sinaiticus (330-360)
- Codex Alexandrinus (400-440)
- Codex Ephraemi Rescriptus (ca. 450; complete)

=== Old Testament references ===
- Revelation 12:5: Psalm 2:8–9

=== New Testament references ===
- Revelation 12:5: Revelation 2:26,27; 19:15.

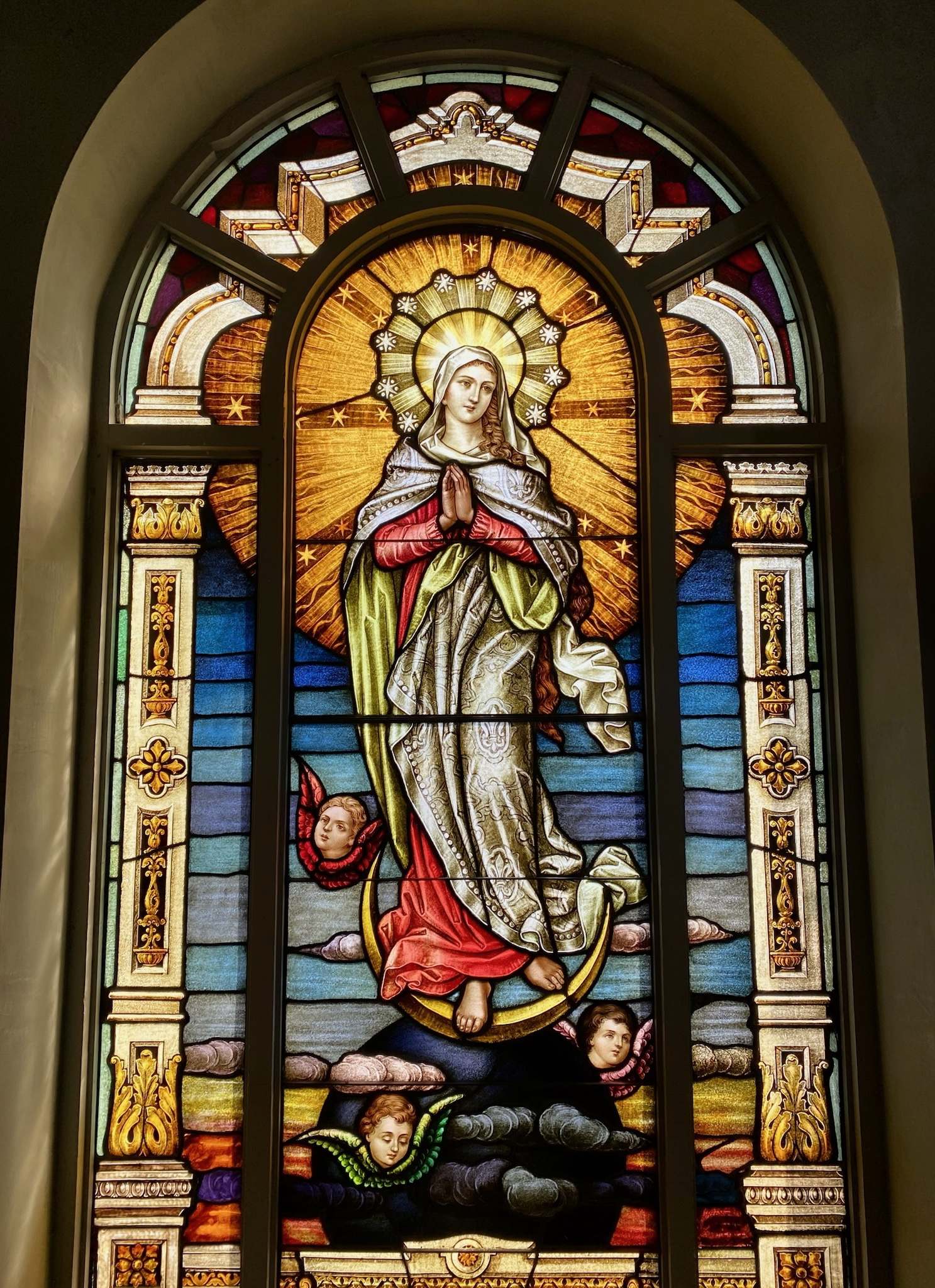
The "woman" is traditionally believed to be the Blessed Virgin Mary whom the Early Church honored as the Queen of Heaven. Prior to the presentation of the woman, John saw a vision of the Ark of the Covenant in heaven. The early Church Fathers saw John's vision of the "woman" right afterward as an indication of Mary as the "Ark of the New Covenant". Mary the Theotokos carried the holy presence of Christ the Word incarnate, the great High Priest, and the bread of life––just as the old Ark of Israel carried the holy presence of God's word (Ten Commandments), Aaron's priestly staff, and the bread from heaven (manna).

== The Woman, the Dragon and the Child (12:1–6) ==
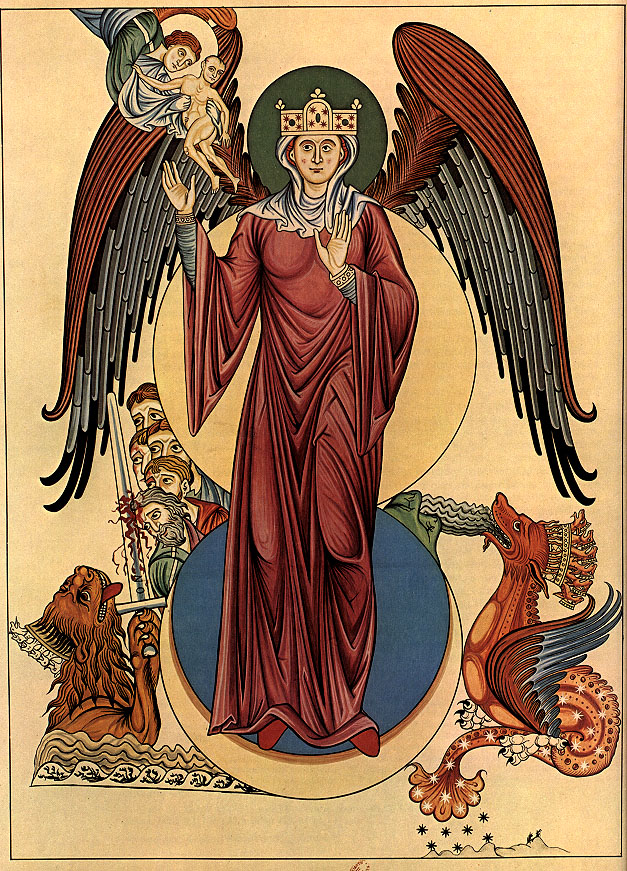
Illustration of the woman of the Apocalypse in Hortus deliciarum (redrawing of an illustration dated c. 1180), depicting various events from the narrative in Revelations 12 in a single image.

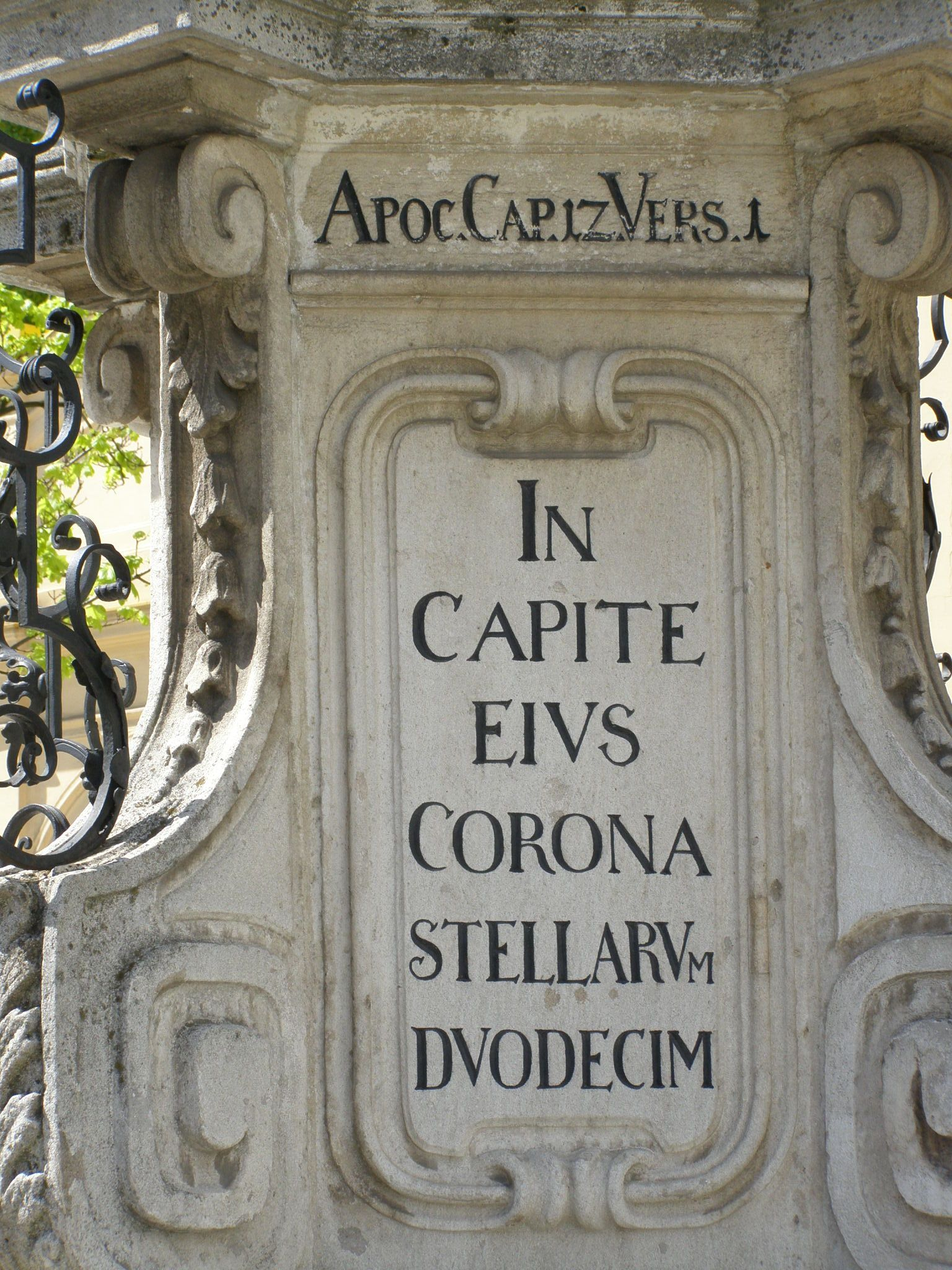
Inscription quoting Revelation 12:1.

=== Verse 1 ===
Now a great sign appeared in heaven: a woman clothed with the sun, with the moon under her feet, and on her head a garland of twelve stars.

The King James Version refers to "a great wonder" and the Revised Standard Version refers to "a great portent". The Greek word used is σημεῖον, rendered sign in many other passages in the New Testament. Anglican biblical commentator William Boyd Carpenter writes that "the word sign is preferable to wonder, both in this verse and in Revelation 12:3. It is the same word which is rendered sign in Revelation 15:1. It is a sign which is seen: not a mere wonder, but something which has a meaning; it is not 'a surprise ending with itself', but a signal to arrest attention, and possessing significance; there is 'an idea concealed behind it'."

=== Verse 3 ===
And another sign appeared in heaven: behold, a great, fiery red dragon having seven heads and ten horns, and seven diadems on his heads.

The word rendered "dragon" - Ancient Greek: δράκων, drakōn - occurs 9 times (and 4 more in derivative forms) in the New Testament, only in the Book of Revelation, where it is uniformly rendered as here: "dragon". The word for diadem (Greek: διάδημα) occurs only three times in the New Testament, always in the Book of Revelation.

=== Verse 5 ===
And she brought forth a man child, who was to rule all nations with a rod of iron: and her child was caught up unto God, and to his throne.

- "A man child": from Greek: υἱὸν ἄρρενα, (Note: Byzantine, Majority, Textus Receptus: υἱὸν ἄρρενα; Westcott-Hort: υἱὸν ἄρσεν; Tischendorf (8th edition): υἱὸν ἄῤῥην.) huion arréna, literally: "a son, a male". The term "man child" in Jeremiah 20:15 (KJV: "A man child is born") is translated from the Hebrew term: בן זכר, where in the Greek it is υἱὸς ἄρσην, or simply ἄρσην as in the Septuagint rendering of this passage.
- "Rule" from Greek: ποιμαίνειν, poimainein, meaning "tend as a shepherd" (cf. Revelation 2:27). It was prophesied in Psalm 2:9, that Christ should break the nations with a rod of iron.

== Michael and the Dragon (12:7–12) ==
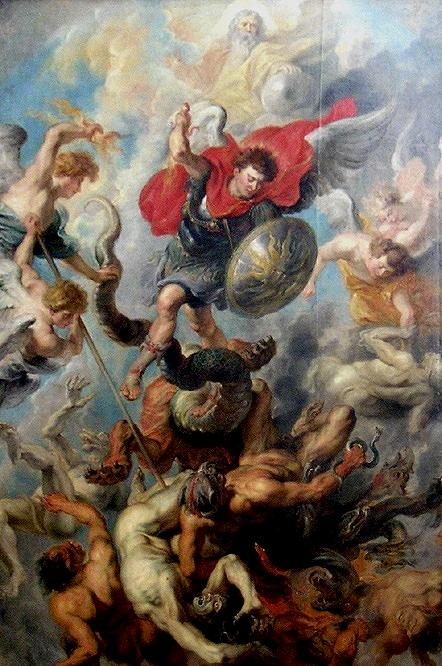
Der Engelsturz ("Fall of the rebel angels"), by Peter Paul Rubens, between 1621 and 1622.

=== Verse 7 ===
And war broke out in heaven: Michael and his angels fought with the dragon, and the dragon and his angels fought.

Michael appears in the Book of Daniel as "the special patron or guardian angel of the people of Israel".

=== Verse 8 ===
and they were not strong enough, and there was no longer a place found for them in heaven.

=== Verse 9 ===
And the great dragon was cast out, that old serpent called the Devil, and Satan, which deceiveth the whole world: he was cast out into the earth, and his angels were cast out with him.

- "Old serpent": This is the only place in canonical Scripture where without doubt it is revealed that the 'Tempter in Eden' (Genesis 3:1) was 'the Devil' (cf. Wisdom 2:24).

=== Verse 11 ===
And they overcame him by the blood of the Lamb, and by the word of their testimony, and they loved not their lives unto the death.

- "Overcame him by the blood of the Lamb" or "conquered him on account of the blood of the Lamb", implying that the power of the accuser or the devil was removed when 'the Lamb of God' had taken away the sin of the world (John 1:29), and when the redeemed people have the boldness to enter into the holiest by the blood of Jesus (Hebrews 10:19).

== The Dragon and the Woman (12:13–17) ==
=== Verse 14 ===
And to the woman were given two wings of a great eagle, that she might fly into the wilderness, into her place, where she is nourished for a time, and times, and half a time, from the face of the serpent.

- "Two wings of a great eagle": Bauckham sees the "eagle's wings" (Exodus 19:4; Deuteronomy 32:11; Isaiah 40:31) and the "wilderness" in this verse as "exodus motifs".

=== Verse 16 ===
And the earth helped the woman, and the earth opened her mouth, and swallowed up the flood which the dragon cast out of his mouth.

- "The earth opened her mouth and swallowed up": these words can be linked to the narrative of the earth opening her mouth and swallowing up Korah, Dathan, and Abiram in Numbers 16:30.

== See also ==
- Jesus Christ
- John's vision of the Son of Man
- Leviathan
- Names and titles of Jesus in the New Testament
- Seven-headed serpent
- Seven trumpets
- War in Heaven
- Woman of the Apocalypse
- Related Bible parts: Revelation 5, Revelation 6, Revelation 7, Revelation 8, Revelation 9, Revelation 11, Revelation 13

== Bibliography ==
- Bauckham, Richard (2007). "81. Revelation". In Barton, John; Muddiman, John (eds.). The Oxford Bible Commentary (first (paperback) ed.). Oxford University Press. pp. 1287–1306. ISBN 978-0199277186.
