= Revelation 11 =

- ← chapter 10 chapter 12 →
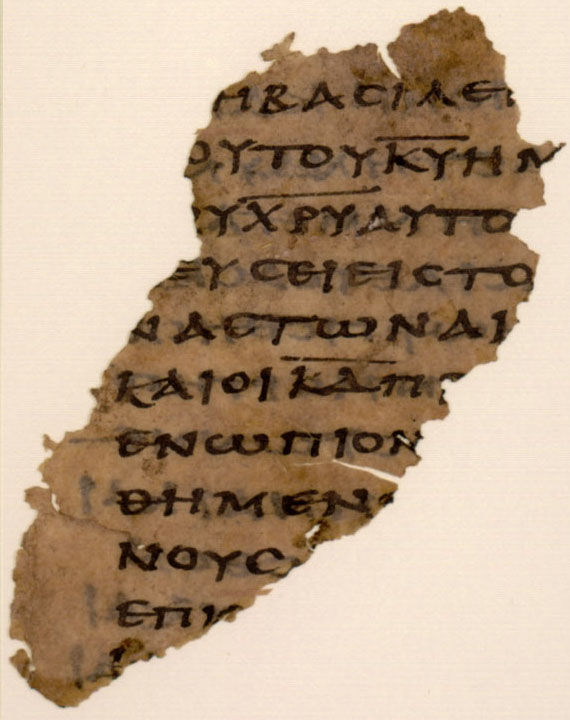
- Revelation 11:15-16 on the recto side of Uncial 0308 (P. Oxy. 4500) from c. AD 350.
- Book: Book of Revelation
- Category: Apocalypse
- Christian Bible part: New Testament
- Order in the Christian part: 27

Revelation 11 is the eleventh chapter of the Book of Revelation or the Revelation of Jesus Christ shown to John in the New Testament of the Christian Bible. The book is traditionally attributed to John the Apostle, but the precise identity of the author remains a point of academic debate. This chapter contains the accounts related to the sounding of the "Seventh Trumpet".

== Text ==
The original text was written in Koine Greek. This chapter is divided into 19 verses.

=== Textual witnesses ===
Some early manuscripts containing the text of this chapter are among others: (Note: The Book of Revelation is missing from Codex Vaticanus.)

- Papyrus 115 (ca. AD 275; extant verses 1–5, 8–15, 18–19)
- Papyrus 47 (3rd century)
- Uncial 0308 (ca. 350; extant verses 15–18)
- Codex Sinaiticus (330-360)
- Codex Alexandrinus (400-440)
- Codex Ephraemi Rescriptus (ca. 450; extant verses 4–19)

=== Old Testament references ===
- Revelation 11:4: Zechariah 4:3; Zechariah 11:14
- The Ark of the Covenant (verse 19) appears on numerous occasions in the Old Testament.

== The two witnesses ( verses 1–6) ==
=== Verse 1 ===
Then I was given a reed like a measuring rod. And the angel stood "Rise and measure the temple of God, the altar, and those who worship there."

- "Then": the Greek: καί (kai, meaning "and") is translated as "then" here to 'indicate the implied sequence within the narrative'.

=== Verse 2 ===
[The angel said:] "But leave out the court which is outside the temple, and do not measure it, for it has been given to the Gentiles. And they will tread the holy city underfoot for forty-two months."

- "Holy city" seems to refer to Jerusalem (cf. Luke 21:24).
- "forty-two months": This is three and a half years, which is half of the sacred number seven.

=== Verse 3 ===
And I will give power to my two witnesses, and they will prophesy one thousand two hundred and sixty days, clothed in sackcloth.

- The word "power" is not in the Greek text, but is implied; added here for clarification.
- Since the Hebrew calendar is composed of twelve 30-day months, "one thousand two hundred and sixty days" represents three and a half years.

=== Verse 4 ===
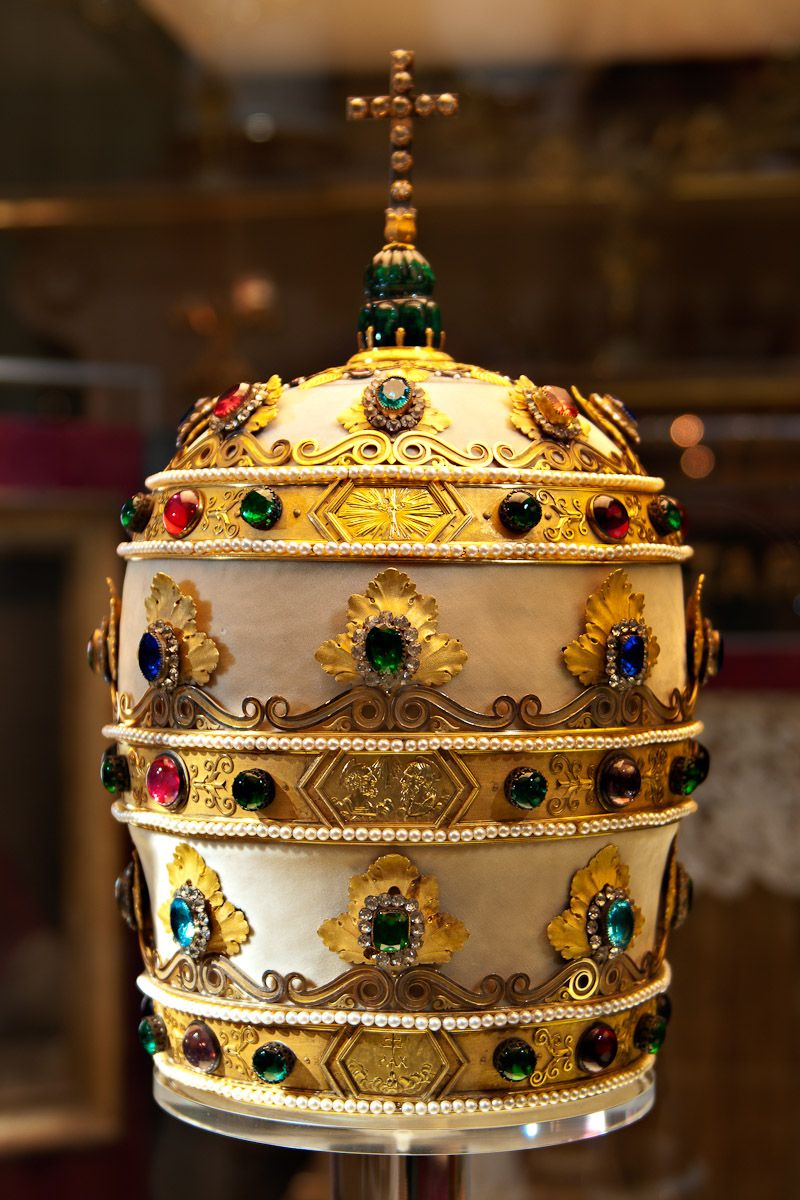
Napoleon Tiara of Pope Pius VII on which the text of Revelation 11:4 was engraved.

These are the two olive trees, and the two candlesticks standing before the God of the earth.

This verse was engraved on a papal tiara which Napoleon gave to Pope Pius VII.

=== Verse 6 ===
They have the power to shut the sky, that no rain may fall during the days of their prophesying, and they have power over the waters to turn them into blood and to strike the earth with every kind of plague, as often as they desire.

- "Power": or "authority"

== Two witnesses killed and raised (verses 7–14) ==
=== Verse 8 ===
And their dead bodies will lie in the street of the great city which spiritually is called Sodom and Egypt, where also our Lord was crucified.

- "Street": from the Greek word πλατεῖα, plateia, referring to "a major (broad) street".

=== Verse 11 ===
Now after the three-and-a-half days the breath of life from God entered them, and they stood on their feet, and great fear fell on those who saw them.

In Revelation, the symbolism of times does not lie in the unit of measurement (days, weeks, years) but in the numerical value attached to the measurement. It is a symbolic illustration of the apparent victory of hostile forces over God's people in the in-between age.

== The Seventh Trumpet (verses 15–19) ==
=== Verse 15 ===
The seventh angel sounded, and there were loud voices in heaven, saying:

"The kingdoms of the world have become the kingdoms of our Lord, and of His Christ,
and He shall reign forever and ever."

- "Christ" from Greek word christos which means "one who has been anointed", the same as the word "Messiah" in Hebrew and Aramaic.

=== Verse 19 ===
Then the temple of God was opened in heaven, and the ark of His covenant was seen in His temple. And there were lightnings, noises, thunderings, an earthquake, and great hail.

In a homily delivered in 2011, Pope Benedict XVI asks, "What is the meaning of the ark? What appears?". He argues that while the ark of the covenant in the Old Testament was a symbol of the presence of God, in the New Testament, the Virgin Mary became "the true ark of the covenant, ... a living, real person". This verse, along with verses from the next chapter referring to the Woman of the Apocalypse, is used in the Catholic Church's Mass for the Assumption of Mary into Heaven.

== Uses ==
=== Music ===
The King James Version of verse 15 is used in the English-language oratorio "Messiah" by George Frideric Handel (HWV 56).

== See also ==
- Egypt
- Jesus Christ
- John's vision of the Son of Man
- Names and titles of Jesus in the New Testament
- Seven trumpets
- Sodom
- Related Bible parts: Revelation 5, Revelation 6, Revelation 7, Revelation 8, Revelation 9, Revelation 10, Revelation 12

== Bibliography ==
- Bauckham, Richard (2007). "81. Revelation". In Barton, John; Muddiman, John (eds.). The Oxford Bible Commentary (first (paperback) ed.). Oxford University Press. pp. 1287–1306. ISBN 978-0199277186.
