= Papyrus 24 =

Papyrus 𝔓^{24}
- New Testament manuscript
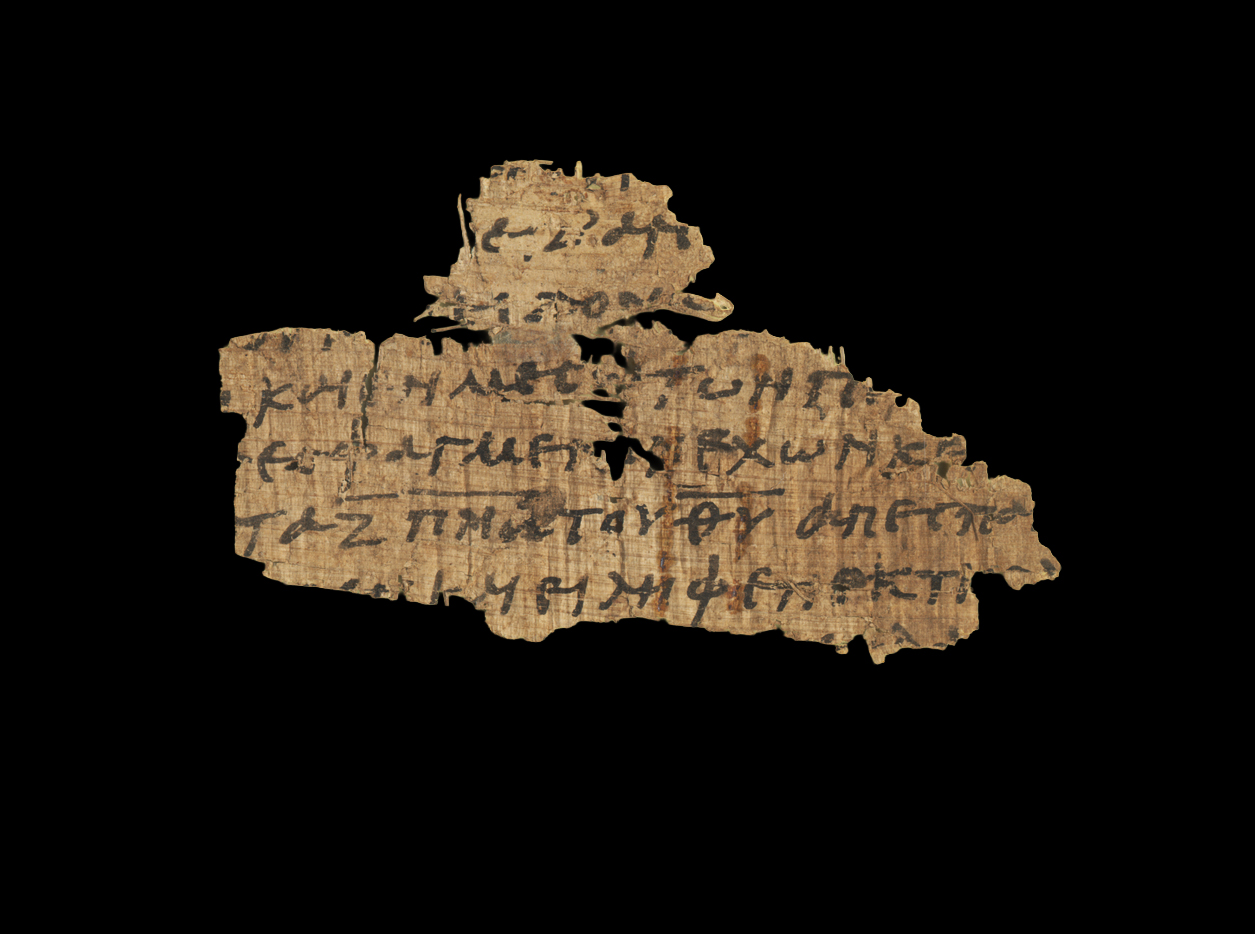
- Recto Revelation 5:5-8
- Name: P. Oxy. 1230
- Text: Revelation 5-6 †
- Date: 4th century
- Script: Greek
- Found: Egypt
- Now at: Yale Divinity School
- Cite: B. P. Grenfell & A. S. Hunt, Oxyrynchus Papyri X, (London 1914), pp. 18-19
- Size: [19 by 28 cm]
- Type: Alexandrian text-type
- Category: I

Papyrus 24 (in the Gregory-Åland numbering), designated by siglum 𝔓^{24}, is an early copy of the New Testament in Greek. It is a papyrus manuscript of the Book of Revelation, it contains only Revelation 5:5-8; 6:5-8. The manuscript paleographically has been assigned to the early 4th century.

== Description ==
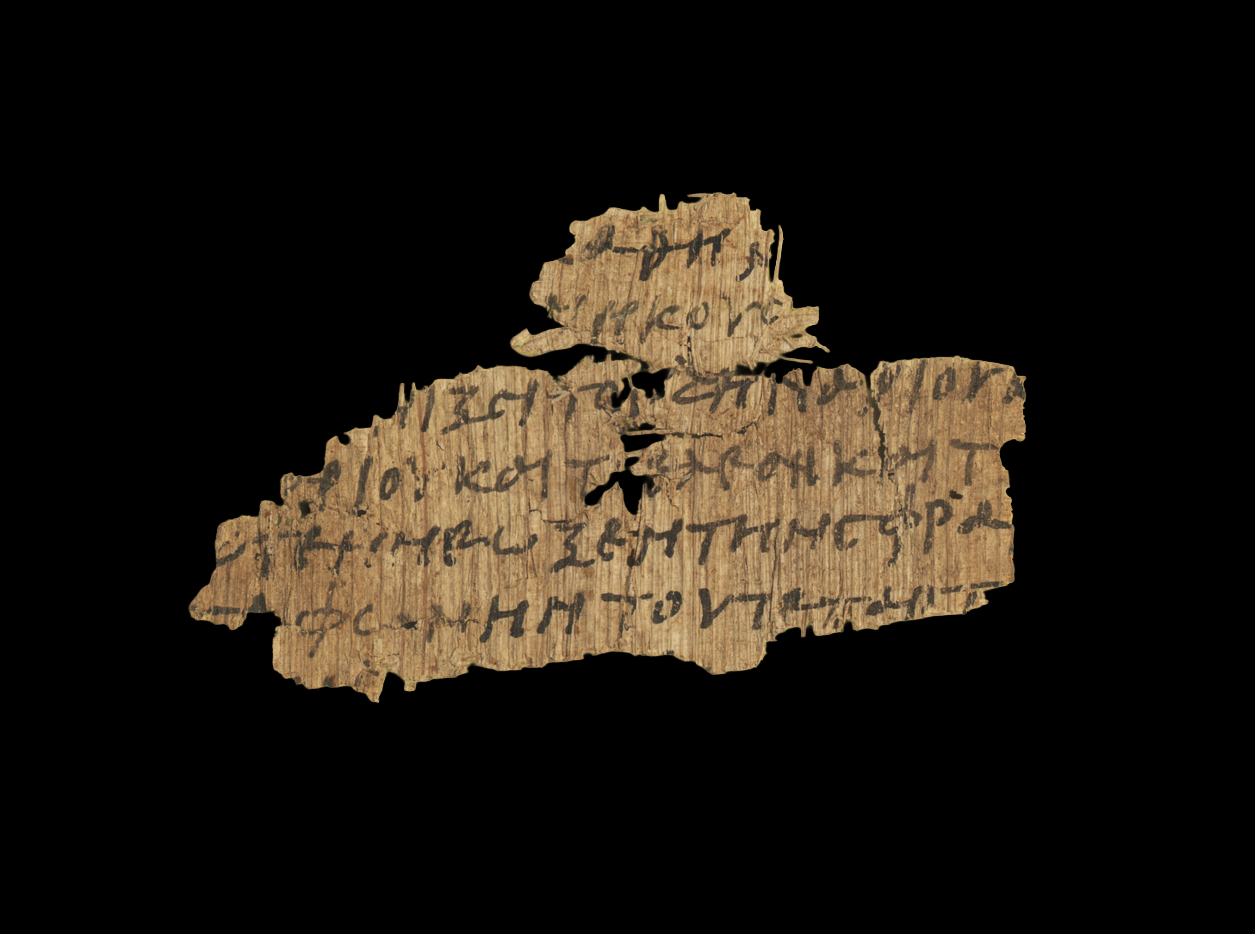
Verso Revelation 6:5-8

Originally it was written on a large leaf (approximately 19 by 28 cm). It is the earliest manuscript which has survived to the present day with the text of Rev. 5–6. It uses letter Ζ for επτα (seven).

The Greek text of this codex is a representative of the Alexandrian text-type (rather proto-Alexandrian). Åland placed it in Category I. This manuscript exhibits textual agreement with Papyrus 18, Papyrus 47, and Codex Sinaiticus, but the surviving fragment is too small to determine its overall textual affinities.

Formerly housed at the Franklin Trask Library of Andover Newton Theological School (OP 1230) in Newton, Massachusetts, this and other MSS from Andover Newton are now held at the library of Yale Divinity School.

== See also ==
- List of New Testament papyri
- Revelation 5, 6
