= Revelation 10 =

- ← chapter 9 chapter 11 →
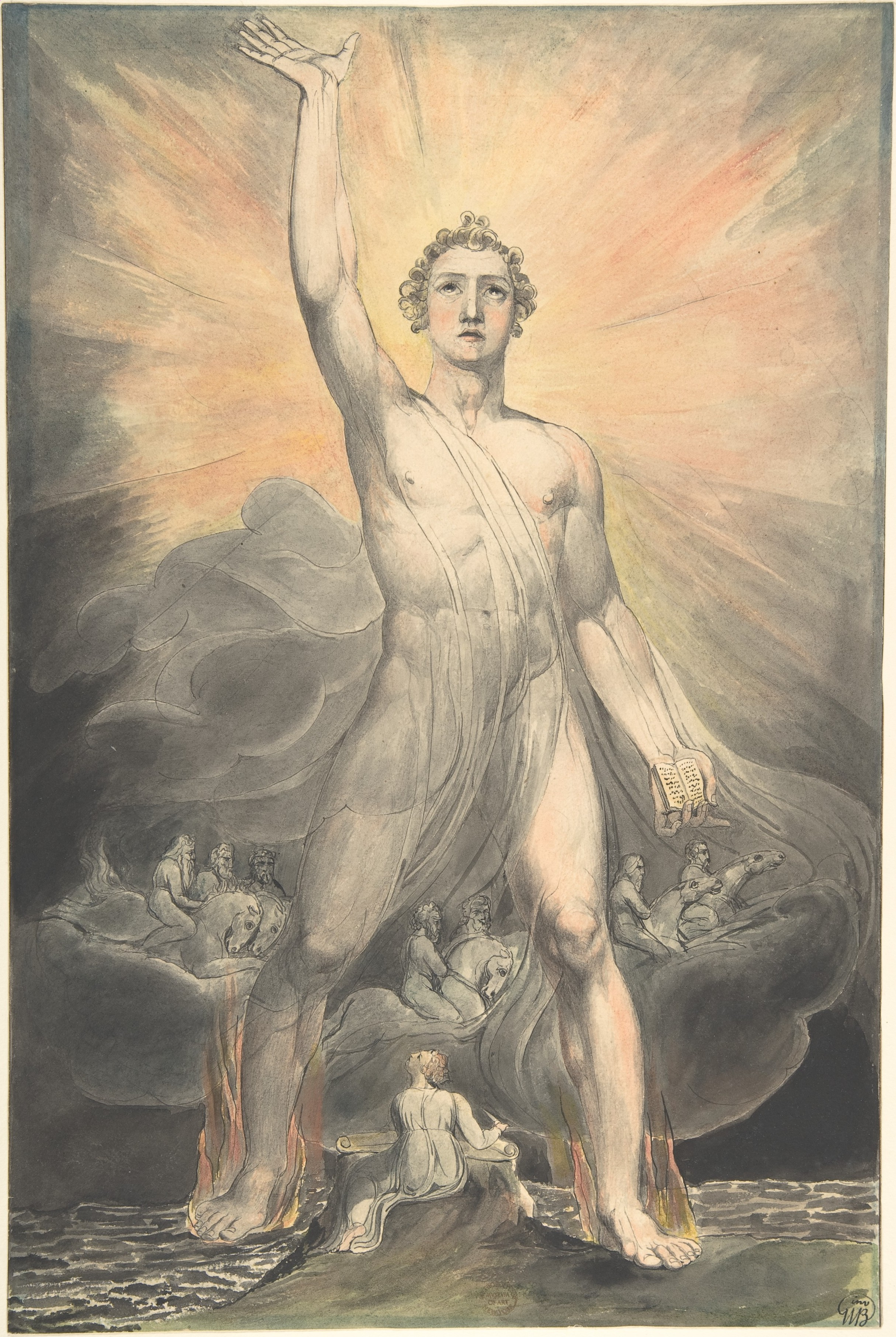
- Angel of the Revelation (Book of Revelation, chapter 10), circa 1803–5, by William Blake (1757–1827)
- Book: Book of Revelation
- Category: Apocalypse
- Christian Bible part: New Testament
- Order in the Christian part: 27

Revelation 10 is the tenth chapter of the Book of Revelation or the Apocalypse of John in the New Testament of the Christian Bible. The book is traditionally attributed to John the Apostle, but the precise identity of the author remains a point of academic debate. This chapter and the first part of the next chapter report two episodes which intervene between the sounding of the sixth and seventh trumpets.

== Text ==
The original text was written in Koine Greek. This chapter is divided into 11 verses.

=== Textual witnesses ===
Some early manuscripts containing the text of this chapter are among others: (Note: The Book of Revelation is missing from Codex Vaticanus.)

- Papyrus 115 (ca. AD 275; extant verses 1–4, 8–11)
- Papyrus 47 (3rd century; complete)
- Papyrus 85 (4th century; extant verses 1–2, 5–9)
- Codex Sinaiticus (330-360)
- Codex Alexandrinus (400-440)
- Codex Ephraemi Rescriptus (ca. 450; extant verses 1–9)

=== Old Testament references ===
- Revelation 10:9: Ezekiel 2:8; Ezekiel 3:3

== Verse 1 ==
I saw still another mighty angel coming down from heaven, clothed with a cloud.
And a rainbow was on his head, his face was like the sun, and his feet like pillars of fire.

- "Another mighty angel": not one of the four angels standing at the corners of the earth (Revelation 7:2), the seven angels who were given the seven trumpets (Revelation 8:2), the angel with the golden censer (Revelation 8:3) or the four angels chained up by the river Euphrates (Revelation 9:14–15), but possibly the same "mighty" angel previously mentioned in Revelation 5:2. Yet "another angel" proclaims the fall of Babylon the Great in Revelation 18:1–3.
- "Clothed with a cloud": and therefore clothed with something of the state with which Christ will come in judgment (Revelation 1:7).

== Verse 4 ==
Now when the seven thunders uttered their voices, I was about to write; but I heard a voice from heaven saying to me, "Seal up the things which the seven thunders uttered, and do not write them."

- "Uttered": or "sounded".

== Verse 9 ==
So I went to the angel and said to him, "Give me the little book."

And he said to me, "Take and eat it; and it will make your stomach bitter, but it will be as sweet as honey in your mouth."

== Verse 11 ==
And he [the angel] said to me, “You must prophesy again about many peoples, nations, tongues, and kings.”

== See also ==
- Events of Revelation
- Book of Daniel
- Jesus Christ
- John's vision of the Son of Man
- Names and titles of Jesus in the New Testament
- Related Bible parts: Revelation 9, Revelation 11
