= Revelation 9 =

- ← chapter 8 chapter 10 →
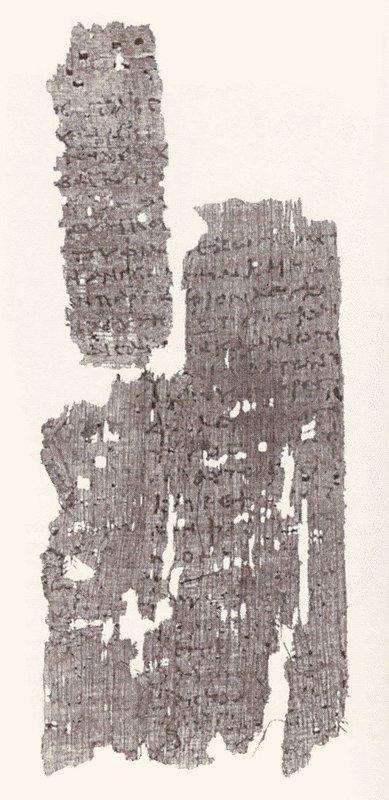
- Revelation 1:13-2:1 on the verso side of Papyrus 98 from the second century.
- Book: Book of Revelation
- Category: Apocalypse
- Christian Bible part: New Testament
- Order in the Christian part: 27

Revelation 9 is the ninth chapter of the Book of Revelation or the Apocalypse of John in the New Testament of the Christian Bible. The book is traditionally attributed to John the Apostle, but the precise identity of the author remains a point of academic debate. In this chapter, the next two angels' trumpets are sounded, following the sounding of the first four trumpets in chapter 8. These two trumpets and the final trumpet, sounded in chapter 11, are sometimes called the "woe trumpets".

== Text ==
The original text was written in Koine Greek. This chapter is divided into 21 verses.

=== Textual witnesses ===
Some early manuscripts containing the text of this chapter are among others: (Note: The Book of Revelation is missing from Codex Vaticanus.)

- Papyrus 115 (ca. AD 275; extant verses 1–5, 7–16, 18–21)
- Papyrus 47 (3rd century)
- Papyrus 85 (4th century; extant verses 19–21)
- Codex Sinaiticus (330-360)
- Codex Alexandrinus (400-440)
- Codex Ephraemi Rescriptus (ca. 450; extant verses 17–21)

=== Old Testament references ===
- Revelation 9:20: Psalm 115:4; Psalm 135:15

== The Fifth Trumpet (9:1–11) ==
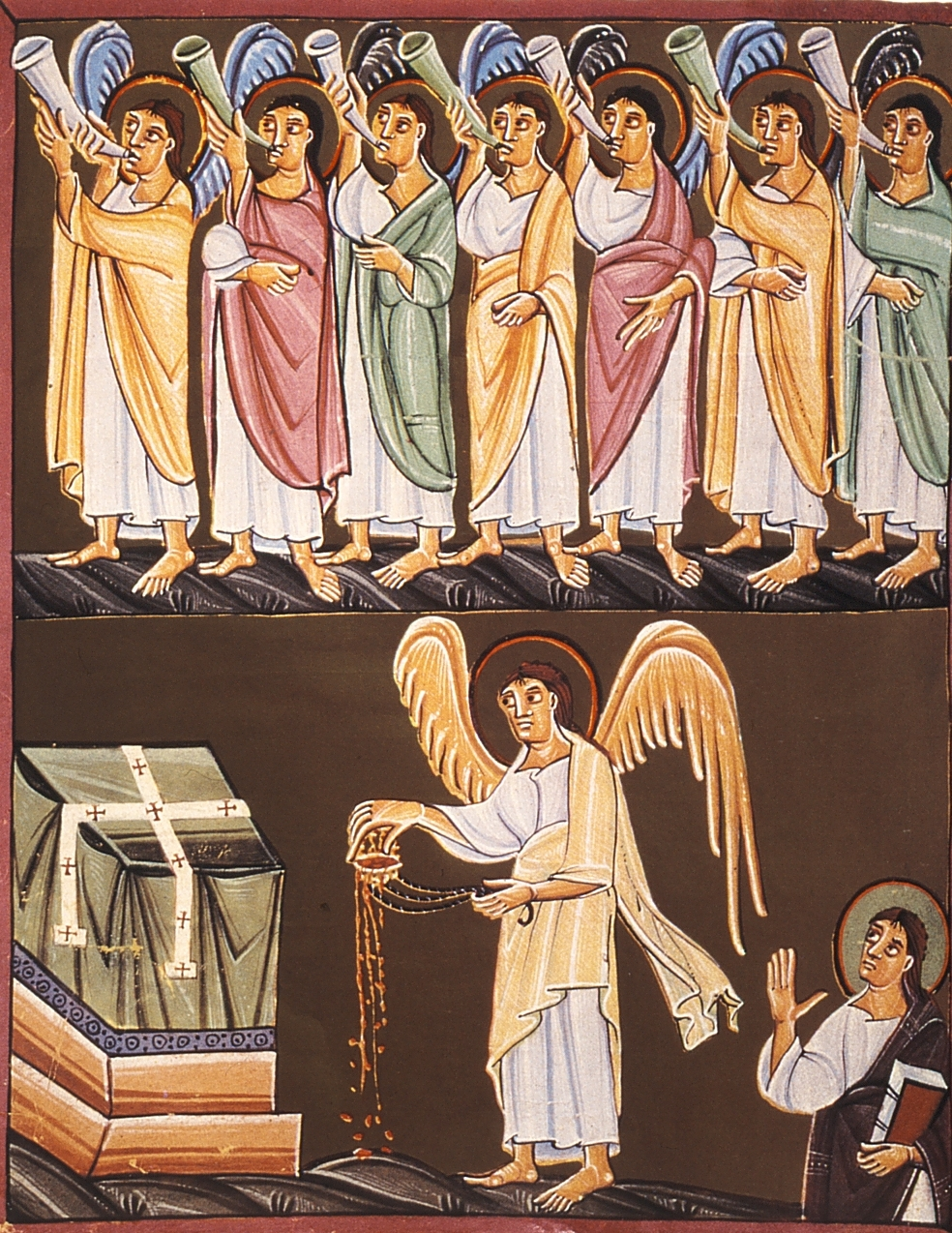
The seven angels with seven trumpets, and the angel with a censer, from the Bamberg Apocalypse.

=== Verse 1 ===
Then the fifth angel sounded: And I saw a star fallen from heaven to the earth. To him was given the key to the bottomless pit.

English nonconformist Moses Lowman explains that "stars, in the language of prophecy, signify angels.

"The key to the bottomless pit" (Biblical Greek: ἡ κλεὶς τοῦ φρέατος τῆς ἀβύσσου, romanized: hē kleis tou phreatos tēs abyssou) is translated as "the key to the shaft of the Abyss" in the New International Version.

=== Verse 3 ===
Then out of the smoke locusts came upon the earth. And to them was given power, as the scorpions of the earth have power.

These locusts are 'a demonized version of the army of locusts in Joel 2:1–11'.

=== Verse 4 ===
They were commanded not to harm the grass of the earth, or any green thing, or any tree

Early Methodist theologian Joseph Benson says that this instruction "demonstrates that they were not natural but symbolical locusts."

=== Verse 11 ===
And they had as king over them the angel of the bottomless pit, whose name in Hebrew is Abaddon, but in Greek he has the name Apollyon.

The Vulgate adds a Latin equivalent, Exterminans, which the Wycliffe Bible explains as "Destroyer". The latter also describes the angel as "the angel of deepness".

== The Sixth Trumpet (9:12–21) ==
=== Verse 16 ===
Now the number of the army of the horsemen was two hundred million; I heard the number of them.

== See also ==
- Abaddon/Apollyon
- Euphrates
- Jesus Christ
- John's vision of the Son of Man
- Names and titles of Jesus in the New Testament
- Seven trumpets
- Related Bible parts: Joel 2, Revelation 8, Revelation 10, Revelation 11

== Bibliography ==
- Bauckham, Richard (2007). "81. Revelation". In Barton, John; Muddiman, John (eds.). The Oxford Bible Commentary (first (paperback) ed.). Oxford University Press. pp. 1287–1306. ISBN 978-0199277186.
