= Uncial 0308 =

- New Testament manuscript
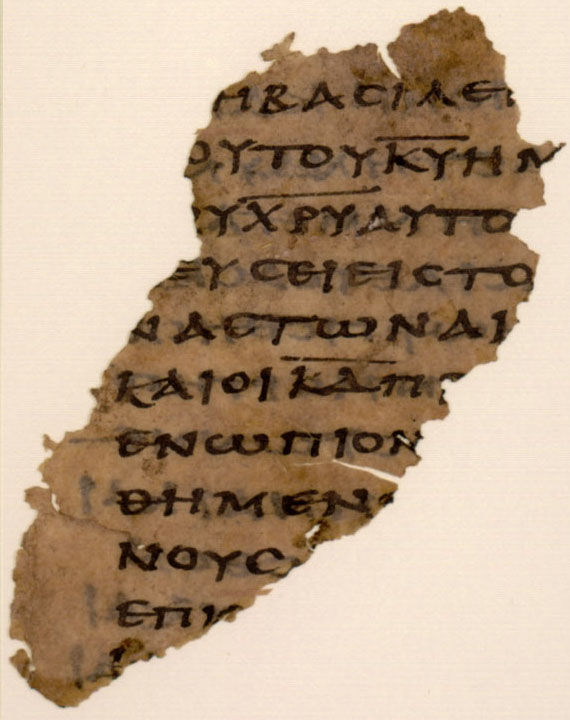
- Fragment of the text Rev 11:15-16
- Name: Oxyrhynchus 4500
- Text: Revelation 11:15-16; 11:17-18
- Date: c. 350
- Script: Greek
- Found: Oxyrhynchus
- Now at: Oxford, Sackler Library (P. Oxy. 4500)
- Cite: W. E. H. Cockle, "4500. Revelation XI 15–16; 17–18", OP LXVI (London, 1999)
- Size: 5.9 cm x 4.8 cm (8 x 8 cm)
- Type: Alexandrian text-type (?)
- Category: none
- Note: concurs with p^{47}, א

Codex 0308 (in the Gregory-Aland numbering), is one of the recently registered New Testament Greek uncial manuscripts. It consists of only a fragment of a single parchment leaf of a fourth-century codex, containing portions of the eleventh chapter of the Book of Revelation.

== Description ==
The surviving texts of Revelation are verses 11:15-16 and 11:17-18; they are in fragmentary condition. Uncial 0308 measures 5.9 cm × 4.8 cm (2.3 in × 1.9 in) with the surviving leaf having 11 lines out of an original 14 (see reconstruction below). The text was written one column to a page, though line lengths were irregular. The letters Ε (epsilon) and Θ (theta) have an extended middle line, and they are similar to those from Codex Washingtonianus. These characters appear influenced by the shape of Coptic letters. The nomina sacra attested in this uncial fragment are Κ̅Σ̅ (Kurios, Lord) and Χ̅Ρ̅Σ̅) (Christos, Christ). The number "twenty four" is also written using an abbreviation — Κ̅Δ̅. All the abbreviations are marked with the superscript bar.

== Text ==
| Uncial 0308 recto | Translation |
| το η βασιλεια του κος | The kingdom of the wor- |
| μου του Κ̅Υ̅ ημων και | ld belongs to our Lord and |
| του Χ̅Ρ̅Υ̅ αυτου και βασι | his Christ, and he shall rei- |
| λευσει εις τους αιω | gn for ev- |
| νας των αιωνων | er and ever |
| και οι Κ̅Δ̅ πρεσβυτεροι οι | and the 24 elders who |
| ενωπιον του Θεου κα | sit before God |
| θημενοι επι τους θρο | on their thro- |
| νους αυτων επεσαν | nes fell |
| επι τα προσωπα αυτ | on their faces |
| ων και προσεκυνησαν | and worshipped |
| τω θεω λεγοντες ευχα | God, saying, we |
| {{{1}}} ο | give thanks to thee Lord |
| Θ̅Σ̅ ο παντοκρατορ | God Almighty |

| Uncial 0308 verso | Translation |
| ο ων και ο ην και οτι ει | who art and who wast |
| ληφας την δυναμιν | that thou hast taken thy power |
| σου την μεγαλην και | great and |
| εβασιλευσας και | begun to reign |
| τα εθνη ωργισθησαν | The nations raged |
| και ηλθην η οργη σου | but thy wrath came |
| και ο καιρος των νε | and the time for the |
| κρων κριθηναι και | dead to be judged |
| δουναι τον μισθον | for rewarding |
| τοις δουλοις σου και | thy servants and |
| τοις προφηταις και | the prophets |
| τοις αγιοις και | and saints |
| τοις φοβουμενοις | and those who fear |
| το ονομα σου | thy name |

Although the text of the codex is too brief to determine its textual character, it concurs with both Codex Sinaiticus and with 𝔓^{47} (Papyrus 47), with one exception. In Rev 11:16 it has the textual variant κα]θημενο[ι, agreeing with Codex Alexandrinus, Uncial 051 and $\mathfrak{M}$^{A} against καθηνται—𝔓^{47} and Codex Ephraemi—also οι καθηνται—Sinaiticus and $\mathfrak{M}$^{K}. In Rev 11:17 it has και οτι, a variant supported by: 𝔓^{47}, א, C and 2344. In Re 11:18 it has textual variant "τοις δουλοις σου και τοις προφηταις" (like: Sinaiticus and 𝔓^{47}), Textus Receptus and NA27 have: "τοις δουλοις σου τοις προφηταις". It differs two times with NA27 (και used 2 times more). The text of the codex was published by W. E. H. Cockle in 1999.

It is cataloged among the Oxyrhynchus Papyri as P. Oxy. 4500, and is now part of the Sackler Library collection in Oxford.

== See also ==
- List of New Testament uncials
- Revelation 11
