= Revelation 8 =

- ← chapter 7 chapter 9 →
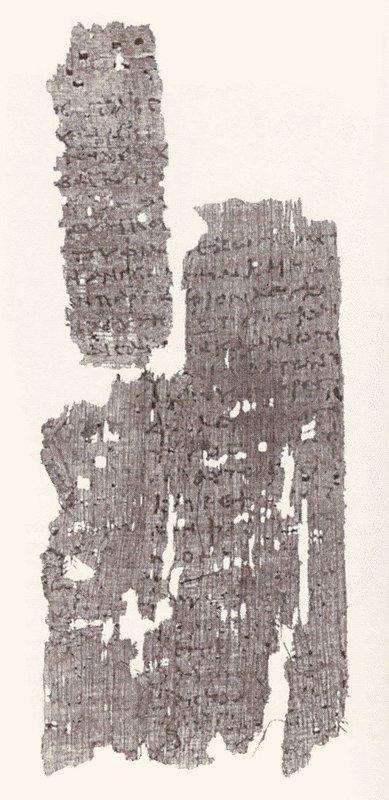
- Revelation 1:13-2:1 on the verso side of Papyrus 98 from the second century.
- Book: Book of Revelation
- Category: Apocalypse
- Christian Bible part: New Testament
- Order in the Christian part: 27

Revelation 8 is the eighth chapter of the Book of Revelation or the Apocalypse of John in the New Testament of the Christian Bible. The book is traditionally attributed to John the Apostle, but the precise identity of the author remains a point of academic debate.

In verse 1, the opening of the seventh seal concludes a section beginning in chapter 6 which records the opening of the "Seven Seals". Verses 2-13 and chapters 9 to 11 contain an account relating to the sounding of the "Seven Trumpets". In chapter 8, the first four angels' trumpets are sounded.

== Text ==
The original text was written in Koine Greek. This chapter is divided into 13 verses.

=== Textual witnesses ===
Some early manuscripts containing the text of this chapter are among others: (Note: The Book of Revelation is missing from Codex Vaticanus.)

- Papyrus 115 (ca. AD 275; extant verses 3–8, 11–13)
- Codex Sinaiticus (330-360)
- Codex Alexandrinus (400-440)
- Codex Ephraemi Rescriptus (ca. 450; extant verses 1–4)

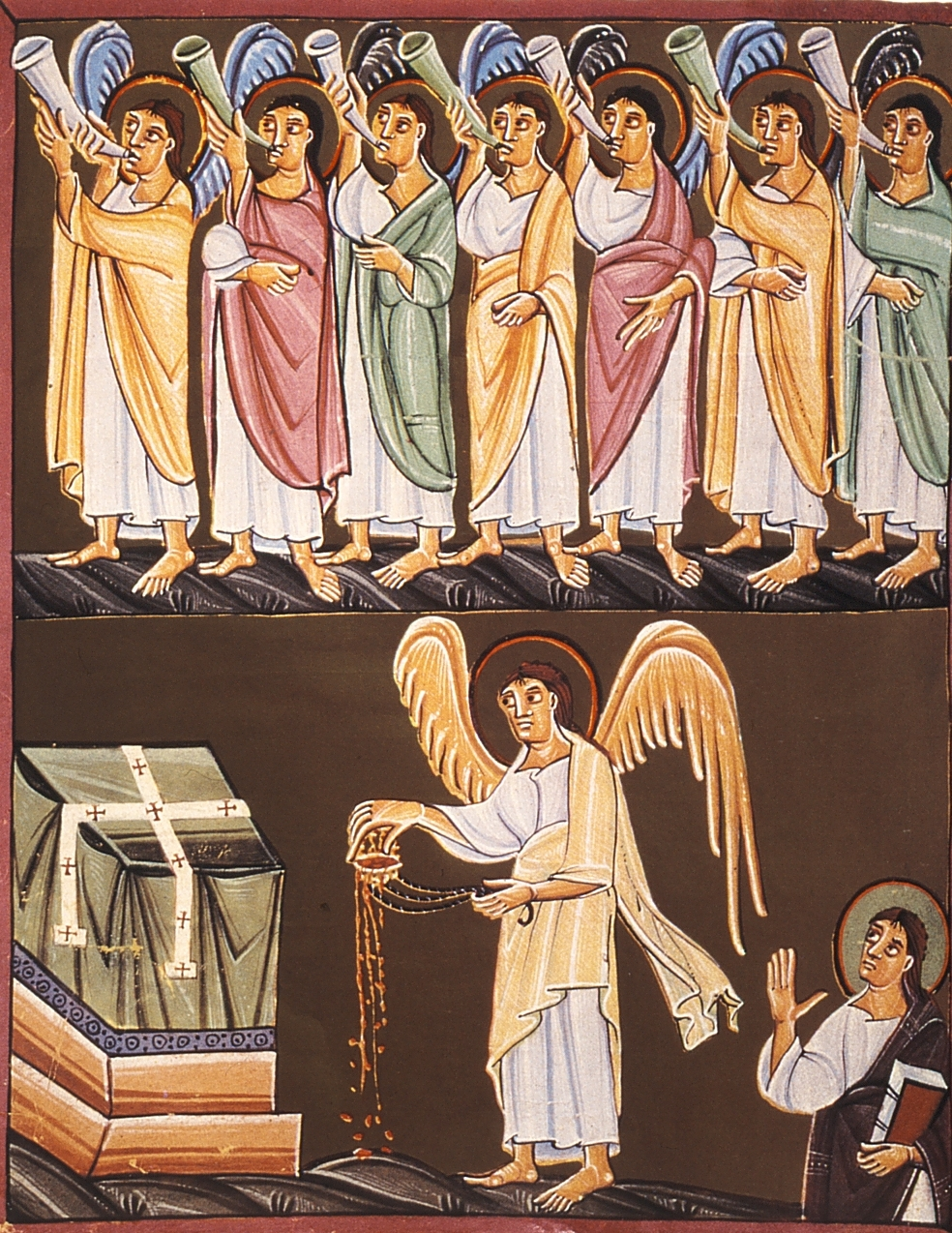
The seven angels with seven trumpets, and the angel with a censer, from the Bamberg Apocalypse.

== The Seventh Seal (8:1–5) ==
=== Verse 1 ===
When He (the Lamb) opened the seventh seal, there was silence in heaven for about half an hour.

"The silence in heaven, lasting about a half-hour, begins at the place where the songs of praise still resound (Revelation 7:10–12)." The Expanded Bible describes the silence as "a dramatic pause induced by awe". Silence in the presence of God is evoked by several of the minor prophets: Habakkuk 2:20, Zephaniah 1:7 and Zechariah 2:13.

=== Verse 2 ===
And I saw the seven angels who stand before God, and to them were given seven trumpets.

- "The seven angels who stand before God": Heinrich Meyer notes that these are "seven particular angels, not called 'archangels', who, with a certain precedency above all the rest, stand before God". In the deuterocanonical Book of Tobit, Raphael introduces himself as "the angel Raphael, one of the seven, who stand before the Lord". W. H. Simcox, in the Cambridge Bible for Schools and Colleges commentary, suggests that the passage in Tobit bears reference to "a popular Jewish belief as to these Angels" and that "St John’s vision is expressed in terms of that belief and, it may fairly be thought, sanctions it with his prophetic authority".

=== Verse 3 ===
And another angel came and stood at the altar, having a golden censer; and there was given unto him much incense, that he should offer it with the prayers of all saints upon the golden altar which was before the throne.

== The First Four Trumpets (8:6–12) ==
Similar to the first four seals, 'the first four trumpet-blasts' form a quartet', each affecting a third of the four regions of God's creation: earth, sea, fresh water, and heavens (cf. Revelation 14:7).

=== Verse 6 ===
And the seven angels which had the seven trumpets prepared themselves to sound.

Mayer points out that "this includes the grasping of the trumpets in such a way that they could bring them to their mouths".

=== Verse 7 ===
And the first blew the trumpet, and there was hail and fire mixed with blood, and it was thrown to the earth, and a third of the earth was burned up, and a third of the trees were burned up, and all the green grass was burned up.

=== Verse 8 ===
Then the second angel blew his trumpet, and a great mountain of fire was thrown into the sea. One-third of the water in the sea became blood,

=== Verse 11 ===
And the name of the star is called Wormwood: and the third part of the waters became wormwood; and many men died of the waters, because they were made bitter.

== Before the Last Three Trumpets (8:13) ==
This part serves as a marker (similar to the others in Revelation 9:12; Revelation 11:14) to indicate the sequence of the woes and to make aware the '(slow) progress' of the terrifying plagues.

=== Verse 13 ===
And I looked, and I heard an angel flying through the midst of heaven, saying with a loud voice, "Woe, woe, woe to the inhabitants of the earth, because of the remaining blasts of the trumpet of the three angels who are about to sound!"

- "Angel" (Greek: ἀγγέλου, angelou): in King James Version and New King James Version based on Textus Receptus; NU and M (Note: NU: 'the 27th edition of the Nestle-Aland Greek New Testament' and 'the 4th edition United Bible Societies'; M:'the Greek New Testament According to the Majority Text'.) read "eagle" (ἀετοῦ, aetou) based on Papyrus 115, Codex Sinaiticus and Codex Alexandrinus.

== See also ==
- Jesus Christ
- John's vision of the Son of Man
- Names and titles of Jesus in the New Testament
- Seven seals
- Seven trumpets
- Wormwood
- Related Bible parts: Revelation 5, Revelation 6, Revelation 7, Revelation 9, Revelation 10, Revelation 11

== Bibliography ==
- Bauckham, Richard (2007). "81. Revelation". In Barton, John; Muddiman, John (eds.). The Oxford Bible Commentary (first (paperback) ed.). Oxford University Press. pp. 1287–1306. ISBN 978-0199277186.
