= Abyss (religion) =

Biblical mythologic bottomless pit

In the Bible, the abyss is an unfathomably deep or boundless place. The term comes from the Greek word abyssos (Ancient Greek: ἄβῠσσος, romanized: ábussos), meaning "deep, unfathomable, boundless". It is used as both an adjective and a noun. It appears in the Septuagint, which is the earliest Greek translation of the Hebrew Bible, and in the New Testament.

It translates the Hebrew words tehóm (Hebrew: תְּהוֹם, lit. 'deep, void'), ṣulā (צוּלָה "sea-deep, deep flood") and the name of the sea monster rahab (רחב "spacious place; rage, fierceness, insolence, pride").

== Biblical usage ==
In the original sense of the Hebrew tehóm, the abyss was the primordial waters or chaos out of which the ordered world was created: "darkness was over the face of the deep" before creation began. The term could also refer literally to the depths of the sea, the deep source of a spring or the interior of the Earth.

The Book of Jonah portrays the prophet's near death experience and his descent to the abyss.

In Psalm 42:7, "deep calls to deep" (referring to the waters), or in Latin abyssus abyssum invocat, developing the theme of the longing of the soul for God.

In a later extended sense in intertestamental Jewish literature, the abyss was the underworld, either the abode of the dead (Sheol) or eventually the realm of the rebellious spirits (fallen angels), i.e., Hell. In the latter sense, specifically, the abyss was often seen as a prison for demons.

This usage was picked up in the New Testament. According to the Gospel of Luke, Jesus sent the Gadarene swine into the abyss (Luke 8:31). Paul of Tarsus uses the term in Romans 10:7 when quoting Deuteronomy 30:12–14, referring to the abode of the dead (cf. also Psalm 71:20). The abyss is also referred to several times in the Book of Revelation: it is the place out of which the locusts and beast from the sea come (Revelation 9:1–11; Revelation 13:1; Revelation 11:7) and serves as a prison for the Seven-Headed Dragon during the Millennium (Revelation 20:3). In Revelation 9:11, Abaddon is called "the angel of the abyss" and the place figures in the conclusion of history and God's final response to evil.

== In Christian theology ==
Cassiodorus relates "deep calls to deep" (Psalm 42:7) to the mutual witness of the two Testaments, the Old Testament foretelling the New, and the New Testament fulfilling the Old.

Pope Gregory XVI draws on "the bottomless pit" in his criticism of those who argue for "liberty of conscience", which was for him an "absurd and erroneous proposition". Were freedom to be granted allowing people to believe whatever thy chose, the "pit" would be open from which the author of the Book of Revelation "saw smoke ascending" "thence comes transformation of minds, corruption of youths, contempt of sacred things and holy laws — in other words, a pestilence more deadly to the state than any other".

== Gnostic usage ==
On the Origin of the World, a text used in Gnosticism, states that during the end of the world, the archons will be cast into the abyss by Sophia for their injustice. There they will fight each other until only the chief archon remains and turns against himself.

== See also ==
- Abyss (Thelema)
- Abzu
- Cognitive closure (philosophy)
