= Revelation 7 =

- ← chapter 6 chapter 8 →
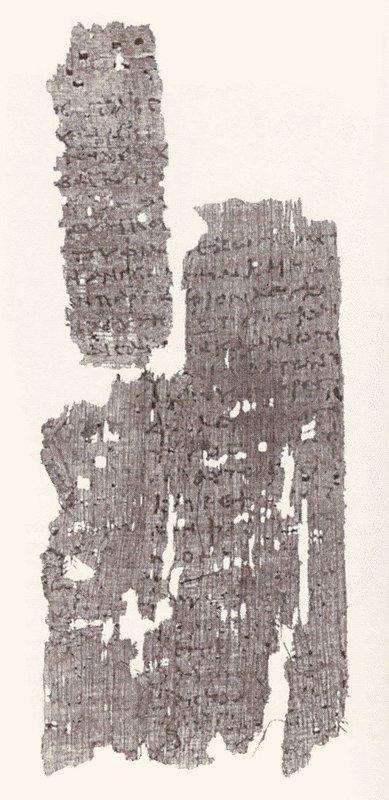
- Revelation 1:13-2:1 on the verso side of Papyrus 98 from the second century.
- Book: Book of Revelation
- Category: Apocalypse
- Christian Bible part: New Testament
- Order in the Christian part: 27

Revelation 7 is the seventh chapter of the Book of Revelation or the Apocalypse of John in the New Testament of the Christian Bible. The book is traditionally attributed to John the Apostle, but the precise identity of the author remains a point of academic debate. Chapter 6 to Chapter 8:5 record the opening of the Seven Seals. This chapter contains the writer's vision of "the Four Angels of the Four Winds", the sealing of the 144,000 and the "Praise of the Great Multitude of the Redeemed". The passage in this chapter is 'an intercalation in the numbered series of seven'.

== Text ==
The original text was written in Koine Greek. This chapter is divided into 17 verses.

=== Textual witnesses ===
Some early manuscripts containing the text of this chapter are among others: (Note: The Book of Revelation is missing from Codex Vaticanus.)

- Papyrus 115 (ca. AD 275; extant verses 8–9)
- Codex Sinaiticus (330-360)
- Codex Alexandrinus (400-440)
- Codex Ephraemi Rescriptus (ca. 450; extant verses 1-13)

== The sealed of Israel (verses 1–8) ==
While the judgement is held back by the four angels (verse 1), another angel announced the sealing of God's servants (verses 2–3). The sealing indicates God's ownership as well as protection (cf. Ezek 9:4–6): these people are protected 'to serve God as the messianic army'. Just as a census in the Old Testament era provides the reckoning of Israel's military strength, the counting of 144,000 persons of the twelve tribes of Israel (verses 4–8) indicates the strength of the messianic army who will fight the war against God's enemies in the last days. The tribe of Judah, being the tribe of the Messiah (5:5), is numbered first.

=== Verse 1 ===
I saw four angels standing at the four corners of the earth, holding the four winds of the earth, that the wind should not blow on the earth, on the sea, or on any tree.

"Holding" is interpreted as "holding back" the winds. The noncomformist biblical commentator Matthew Henry suggests that "the blowing of the four winds together means a dreadful and general destruction". The Septuagint and Vulgate versions of Zechariah 6:5 refers to "the four winds of heaven", although the King James Version and many other translations refer to "the four spirits of the heavens". The Pulpit Commentary suggests that translation as "the four winds" is "doubtless correct": "the winds are supposed to be God's servants, waiting his pleasure to be sent forth on his errands". Jamieson, Fausset and Brown relate the holding back of judgment to the plea given to the saints on the opening of the fifth seal in Revelation 6:

“How long, O Lord, holy and true, until You judge and avenge our blood on those who dwell on the earth?” Then a white robe was given to each of them; and it was said to them that they should rest a little while longer ...

English clergyman John Keble uses the image in his poem, All Saints Day:

The four strong winds of Heaven fast bound.

New Testament scholar Ronald L. Farmer believes the author of Revelation assumed a flat Earth in this verse. Hebrew Bible scholar Dr. Kyle Greenwood believes that this verse references the four compass points, like in Revelation 20:8, Isaiah 11:12 and Ezekiel 7:2. He claims that this "seems to have been an idiom related to the four cardinal directions, which encompassed the totality of earth’s surface."

=== Verse 4 ===
And I heard the number of those who were sealed. One hundred and forty-four thousand of all the tribes of the children of Israel were sealed.

"The children of Israel" (Greek: "the sons of Israel") normally denotes "the Israelites as an ethnic entity" ("Twelve Tribes of Israel"), but many scholars see the expression in this context refer to Christians, instead.

=== Verses 5-8 ===
Verses 5-8 list the tribes of Israel: 12,000 were sealed from each. The tribes of Dan and Ephraim are not listed.

== Verse 9 ==
New King James Version

After these things I looked, and behold, a great multitude which no one could number, of all nations, tribes, peoples, and tongues, standing before the throne and before the Lamb, clothed with white robes, with palm branches in their hands,

What John hears in verse 4, the sealing of the 144,000, is reinterpreted by what he sees in verse 9, the appearance of a great multitude.

== Verse 10 ==
New American Standard Bible

and they cry out with a loud voice, saying,

“Salvation to our God who sits on the throne, and to the Lamb.”

== Verse 12 ==
"Amen! Blessing and glory and wisdom,
Thanksgiving and honor and power and might,
Be to our God forever and ever.
Amen."

This is the only instance in the New Testament of a prayer beginning and ending with "Amen".

== See also ==
- David
- Jesus Christ
- John's vision of the Son of Man
- Judah (biblical person)
- Names and titles of Jesus in the New Testament
- Tetramorph
- Related Bible parts: Revelation 5, Revelation 6

== Sources ==
- Bauckham, Richard (2007). "81. Revelation". In Barton, John; Muddiman, John (eds.). The Oxford Bible Commentary (first (paperback) ed.). Oxford University Press. pp. 1287–1306. ISBN 978-0199277186.
