= Seven trumpets =

Described in the Book of Revelation

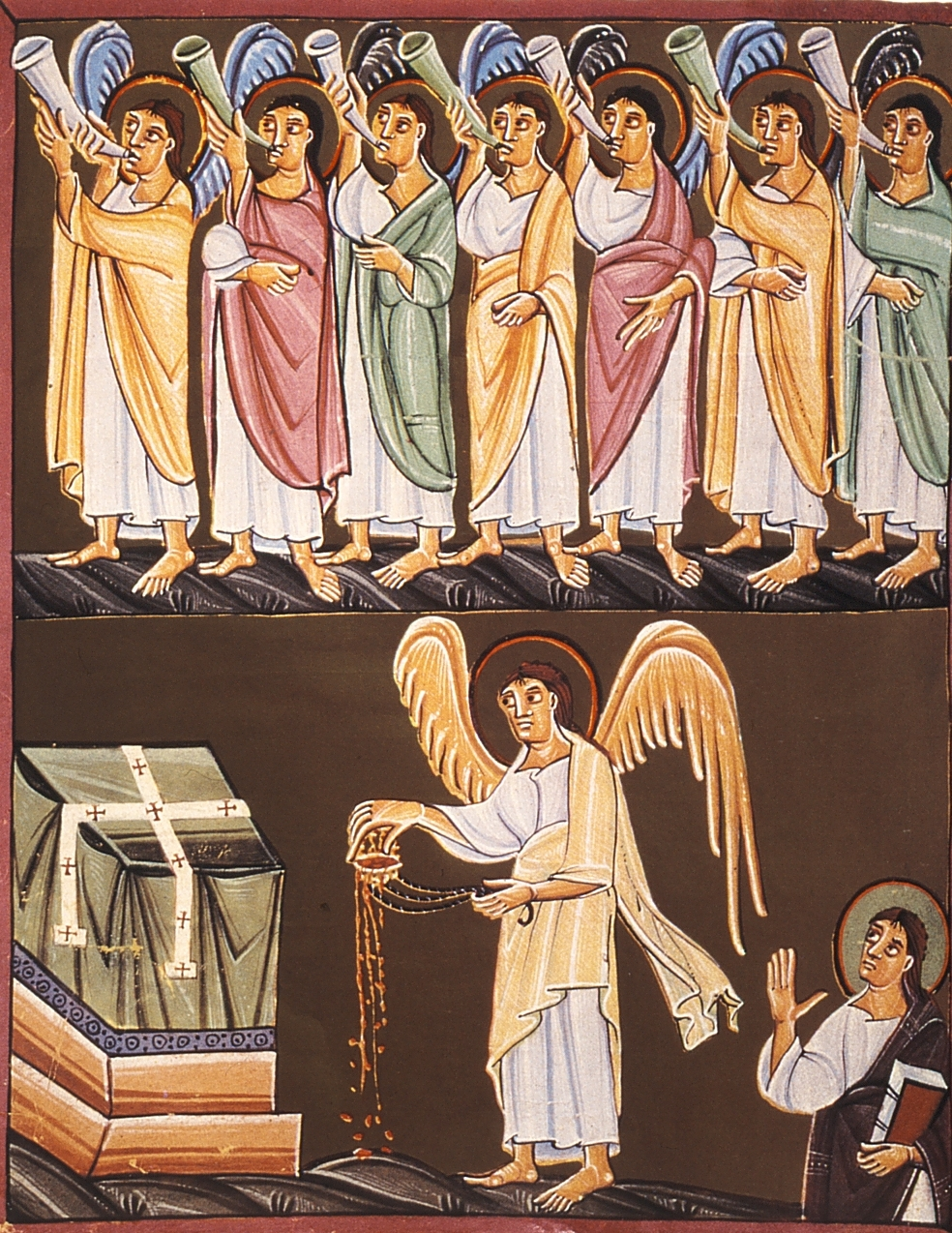
The seven angels with seven trumpets, and the angel with a censer, from the Bamberg Apocalypse.

In the Book of Revelation, seven trumpets are sounded, one at a time, to cue apocalyptic events seen by John of Patmos (Revelation 1:9) in his vision (Revelation 1:1). The seven trumpets are sounded by seven angels and the events that follow are described in detail in Revelation 8–11. However, there are also many other messages, events and signs that occur before and after the trumpets that are described in the Book of Revelation, as this is only one section. According to Revelation 8:1–2 the angels sound these trumpets after the breaking of the seventh seal. These seals secured the apocalyptic document held in the right hand of Him who sits on the throne. The trumpets are referred to in Koine Greek as σάλπιγξ (sálpinx, salpinx); this was a straight, narrow bronze tube with a mouthpiece of bone and a bell; they do not closely resemble modern valve trumpets. The final three trumpets are sometimes called the "woe trumpets".

== Significance ==
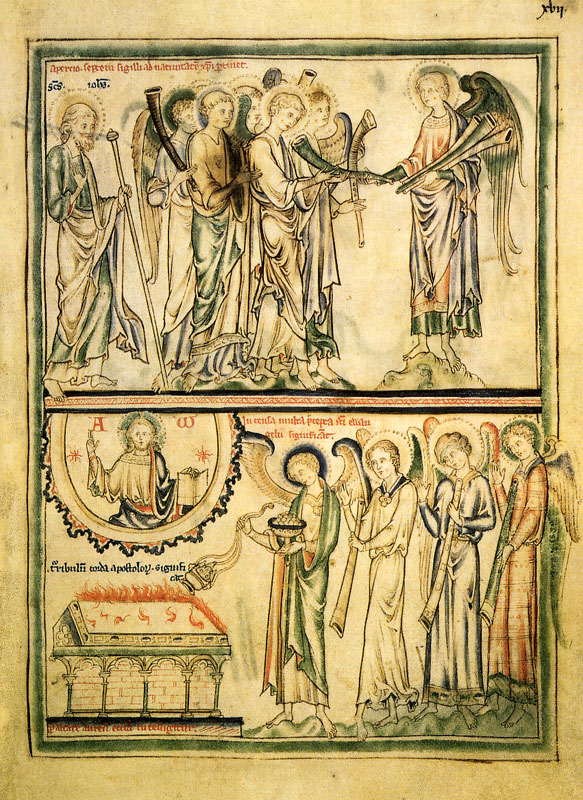
Angels receiving seven trumpets. Pierpont Apocalypse, circa 1255 A.D.

After the Exodus, God had Moses make two silver trumpets, (Numbers 10:2), later called the chazozra. The traditional sacred horn of the ancient Hebrews was the shofar, made from a ram's horn.

=== First trumpet ===
Upon the sound of the first trumpet, hail and fire mingled with blood is thrown to Earth, burning up a third of the trees on the planet, and all green grass. 1/3 of nature will disappear.

=== Second trumpet ===
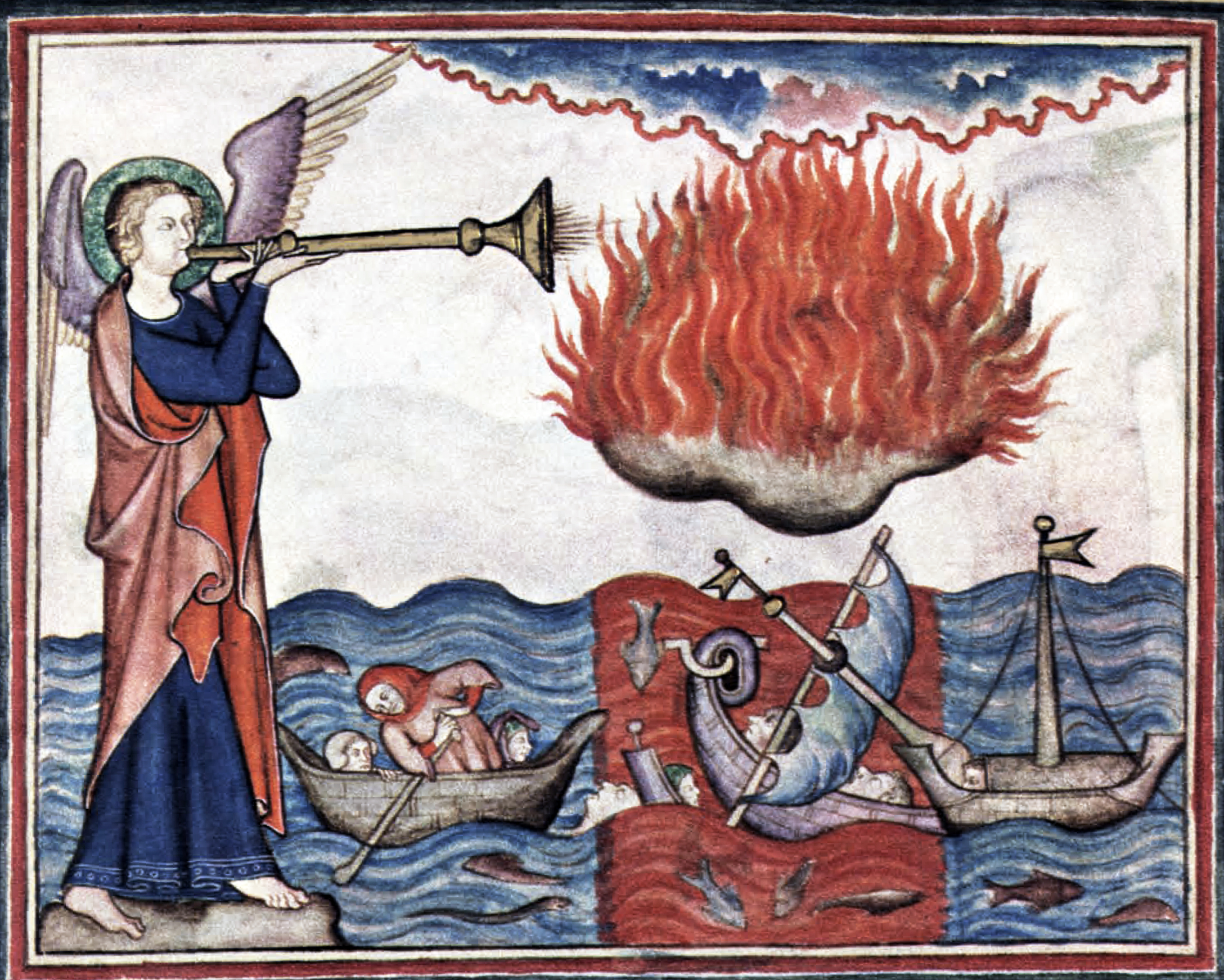
Cloisters Apocalypse (circa 1330), an angel sounds the 2nd trumpet and fire rains on the sea. The trumpet is an añafil, adopted from the Muslim nafir by Christians after the two sides fought in the Reconquista and crusades.

With the sounding of the second trumpet, something described as "a great mountain burning with fire" plunges into the sea and turns a third of the oceans to blood. Soon after, a third of all sea life and a third of all ships will be destroyed.

=== Third trumpet ===
With the sounding of the third trumpet, a great star called Wormwood falls to the Earth, poisoning a third of the planet's freshwater sources, such as rivers and springs. Many will die from the bitterness of its taste.

=== Fourth trumpet ===
Following the sounding of the fourth trumpet, a third of the light that shines from the Sun, moon, and stars becomes dark from the celestial bodies being "struck." This catastrophe causes complete darkness for a third of the day, even through night hours. This is the final trumpet that sounds before the three woes, also known as the fifth, sixth, and seventh trumpets.

=== Fifth trumpet ===
The fifth trumpet is the "first woe" of three. Before this trumpet sounds, an angel (translated as an eagle in some versions) appears, and warns, "Woe, woe, woe, to those who dwell on the earth, because of the remaining blasts of the trumpet of the three angels who are about to sound!"

The fifth trumpet prompts a personified star to fall from heaven. The star is given the key to the bottomless pit. After opening it, the smoke that rises out of the pit darkens the air and blocks the sunlight. Then, from out of the smoke, the locusts are unleashed. The locusts are scorpion-tailed warhorses that have a man's face with lion's teeth. Their hair is long and they fly with locust-like wings. They are adorned with golden crowns and protected with iron breastplates. They are commanded by their king, Abaddon, to torment anyone who does not have the seal of God on their forehead, by using their scorpion-like tails. It is also made clear to them that they must not kill anyone during the five months of torment.

==== Preterist views ====
Robert Witham, a Catholic commentator, issued his two-volume Annotations on the New Testament, in 1733. Commenting on Chapter 9, he offers two preterist views for identifying the locusts with scorpion tails.

1. The locusts may have represented the incursion of the Goths and "those barbarous People" who interrupted the Roman Empire during the time of Decius.
2. The locusts may have represented the Jewish heretics who denied Christ. Most notably, Theodotus, Praxeas, Noetus, Paul of Samosata, Sabellius, and Arius.

=== Sixth trumpet ===
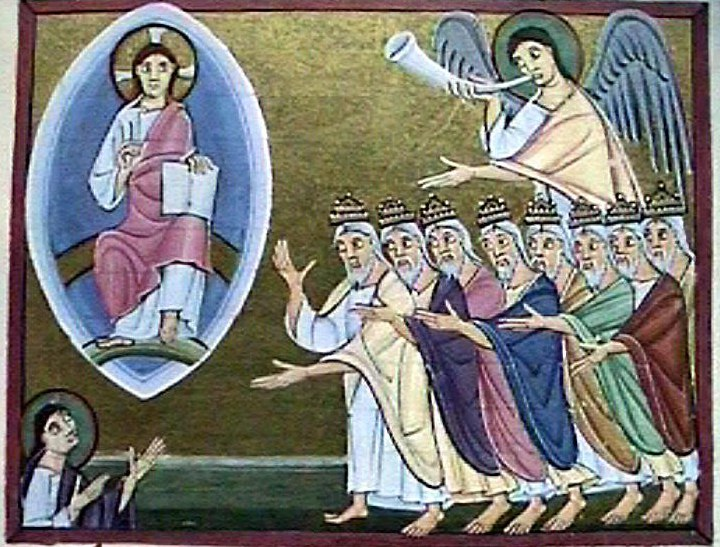
Seventh Trumpet, Bamberg Apocalypse, circa 1010.

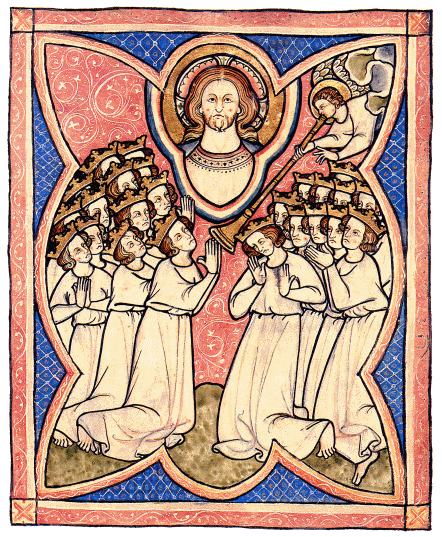
The Seventh Trumpet blows, 13th century illustration.

After the fifth trumpet blast, the sixth one sounds. This is the "second woe", where four angels are released from their binds in the "great river Euphrates". They command a force of two-hundred million mounted troops whose horses exude plagues of fire, smoke, and brimstone from their mouths. The mounted horsemen wore breastplates with the color of fire, hyacinth, and brimstone. The horses are with lion's head and their tails, as well, are like a serpent with a head. These three plagues exuding from the horses will kill a third of all mankind. The text states that the power of the horses is in their mouths and also in their tails. Their tails are like snakes with heads, and they use them to hurt people.

An excerpt from the Good News translation version of this verse in Revelation 9:20-21 states that", The rest of the human race, all those who had not been killed by these plagues, did not turn away from what they themselves had made. They did not stop worshipping demons, nor the idols of gold, silver, bronze, stone, and wood, which cannot see, hear, or walk. 21 Nor did they repent of their murders, their magic, their sexual immorality, or their stealing."

=== Seventh trumpet ===
The sound of the seventh trumpet signals the "third woe." This is the final trumpet and the final woe. Loud voices in Heaven will say: "The kingdom of the world has become the kingdom of our Lord and of His Messiah, and He will reign forever and ever."

== Interpretations ==
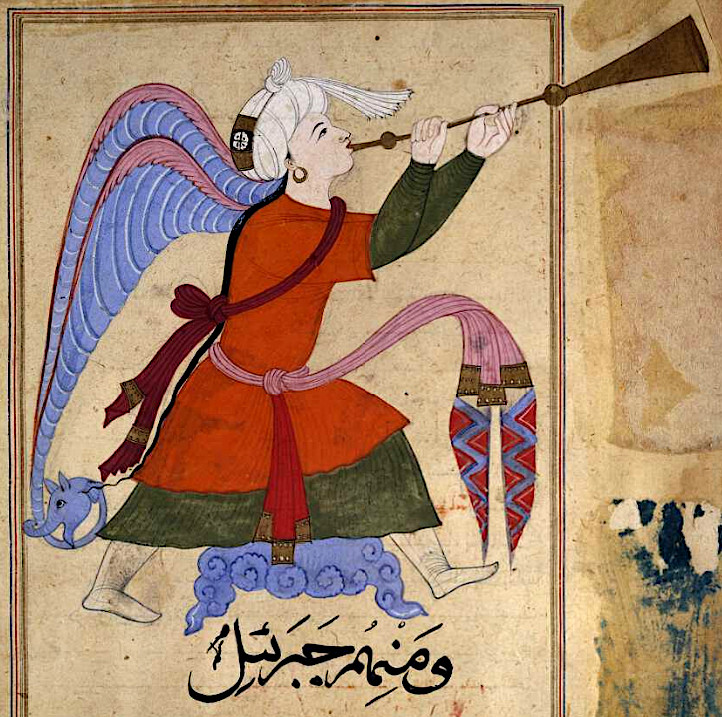
Angels blowing trumpets at the end of the world was not limited to Christian theology. Islamic artwork features the Archangel Israfel blowing the nafir trumpet at the end the world. From the Mameluke Dynasty

In Christian eschatology, all the first six trumpets are used to serve as a wake up call to the sinners on Earth and a call to repentance. Each trumpet blast brings with it a plague of a more disastrous nature than the one before it. The trumpet is used to build anticipation and tells the reader that an alert, announcement, or warning is about to take place. The seventh trumpet does not bring a plague with it. Rather, it is sounded so that glory is given to God and His kingdom is announced.

The Preterist understanding is that these blasts are like war trumpets against apostate Israel of the time period and that they correspond to events in the Jewish Wars. For example, the second trumpet is the nation of Rome depicted as a mountain, symbolic for great nations in the Old Testament, and its destruction of Galilee and the Sea of Galilee becoming full of blood and dead bodies.

Concerning the second trumpet blast, Futurist Christian apologists speculate that the "great mountain burning with fire" that plunges into the sea, in Revelation 8:8, is an impact event by a possible near-Earth object.

Christians who follow the posttribulation rapture doctrine, argue that the seventh trumpet is the last trumpet mentioned in I Corinthians 15:52, and that there is a strong correlation between the events mentioned in Isaiah 27:13, Matthew 24:29-31, and I Thessalonians 4:16. These parallels are used to support the doctrine of the rapture occurring after the tribulation. Therefore, Posttribulationists see the rapture happening during the seventh trumpet. The nature of the 7th trumpet shows that "time is no more, and that the mystery of God is finished, Rev. 10:6,7. At the 7th trumpet, Jesus rules and reigns forevermore, He has taken His great power and reigned, and He rewards the righteous, and judges the wicked. Both Jesus and Paul declare that when Jesus comes, His reward is with Him, and He rewards everyone according to their works, Rev. 22:12,2 Tim 4:1.

According to the Baháʼí Faith, the first woe is the advent of Muhammad, the second woe is the advent of the Báb, and the third woe is the advent of the promised day of God; the manifestation of Baháʼu'lláh, the Prophet-Founder of the Baháʼí Faith. The seventh angel or trumpet refers to "human souls who have been endowed with heavenly attributes and invested with an angelic nature and disposition" who will joyously proclaim and announce the coming of Bahá’u’lláh, the promised Lord of Hosts.

There are some scholars who describe a part from the finale from the second symphony by Gustav Mahler, as the seven trumpets, actually played by four trumpets, bass drum, cymbals and triangle, which are offstage.

== See also ==
- Events of Revelation (Chapters 8–10)
- Seven seals
