= Revelation 6 =

- ← chapter 5 chapter 7 →
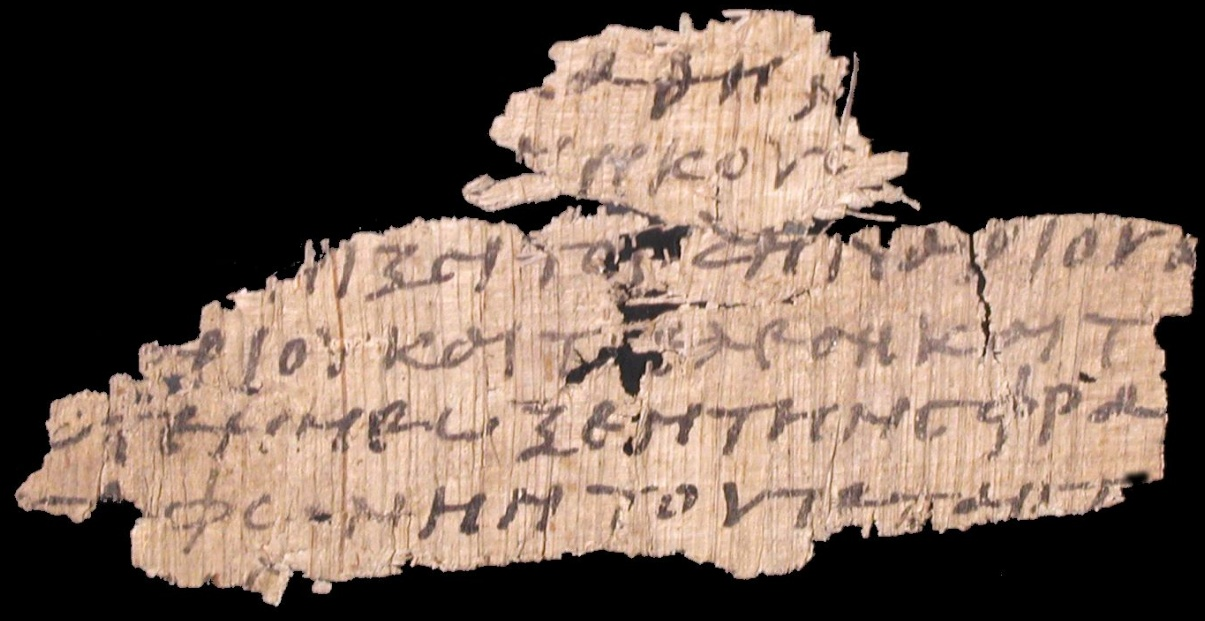
- Revelation 6:5–8 on the verso side of Papyrus 24 from the 4th century.
- Book: Book of Revelation
- Category: Apocalypse
- Christian Bible part: New Testament
- Order in the Christian part: 27

Revelation 6 is the sixth chapter of the Book of Revelation or the Apocalypse of John in the New Testament of the Christian Bible. The book is traditionally attributed to John the Apostle, but the precise identity of the author remains a point of academic debate. This chapter describes the opening of the first six of the seven seals. The opening of the seventh seal is recorded in chapter 8. Four horses and their riders, the Four Horsemen of the Apocalypse, emerge as the first four seals are opened.

== Text ==
The original text was written in Koine Greek. This chapter is divided into 17 verses.

=== Textual witnesses ===
Some early manuscripts containing the text of this chapter are among others: (Note: The Book of Revelation is missing from Codex Vaticanus.)

- Papyrus 115 (~AD 275; extant verses 5–6)
- Codex Sinaiticus (330-360)
- Codex Alexandrinus (400-440)
- Codex Ephraemi Rescriptus (~450; complete)

== The First Four Seals (6:1–8) ==
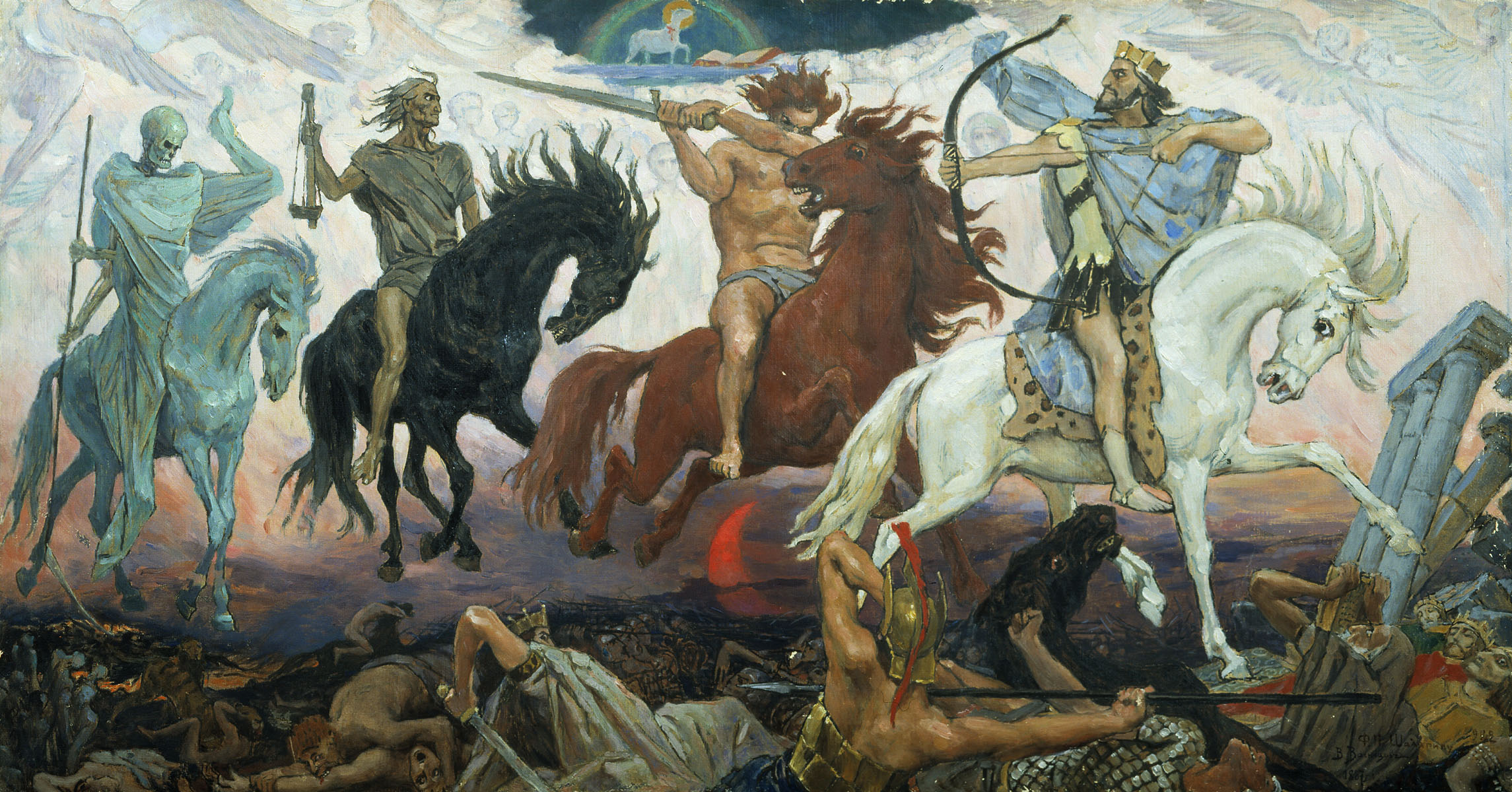
Four Horsemen of the Apocalypse, an 1887 painting by Victor Vasnetsov. The Lamb is visible at the top.

The opening of the first four seals does not yield the content of the scroll, which can only be read after all the seals are opened, but serves as a preparation that recalls 'the beginning of the birth pangs' in Mark 13:7–8.

=== Verse 5 ===
And when he had opened the third seal, I heard the third beast say, Come and see. And I beheld, and lo a black horse; and he that sat on him had a pair of balances in his hand.

=== Verse 6 ===
And I heard a voice in the midst of the four beasts say, A measure of wheat for a penny, and three measures of barley for a penny; and see thou hurt not the oil and the wine.

- "measure" (Greek: choinix or choenix) - that is, approximately one quart or 1.1 litres.
- "penny" (Greek: denarius) - this was approximately one day's wage for a worker.
- "a measure of wheat for a penny, and three measures of barley for a penny"

"a choenix of wheat for a denarius, and three choenixes of barley for a denarius".

The choenix appears to have been the food allotted to one man for a day; while the denarius was the pay of a soldier or of a common labourer for one day (Matthew 20:2, "He agreed with the labourers for a penny a day," and Tacitus, 'Ann.,' 1:17, 26, "Ut denarius diurnum stipendium foret." Cf. Tobit 5:14, where drachma is equivalent to denarius). The choenix was the eighth part of the "modius", and a denarius would usually purchase a modius of wheat. The price given, therefore, denotes great scarcity, though not an entire absence of food, since a man's wages would barely suffice to obtain him food. Barley, which was the coarser food, was obtainable at one third of the price, which would allow a man to feed a family, though with difficulty. A season of great scarcity is therefore predicted, though in his wrath God remembers mercy (cf. the judgments threatened in Leviticus 26:23–26, viz. the sword, pestilence, and famine; also the expression, "They shall deliver you your bread again by weight").

- "And see thou hurt not the oil and the wine."

The corollary to the preceding sentence, with the same signification. It expresses a limit set to the power of the rider on the black horse. These were typical articles of food (cf. Psalm 104:14, 15, "That he may bring forth food out of the earth; and wine that maketh glad the heart of man, and oil to make his face to shine, and bread which strengtheneth man's heart;" and Joel 1:10, "The corn is wasted: the new wine is dried up, the oil languisheth"). Wordsworth interprets, "The prohibition to the rider, 'Hurt not thou the oil and the wine,' is a restraint on the evil design of the rider, who would injure the spiritual oil and wine, that is, the means of grace, which had been typified under those symbols in ancient prophecy (Psalm 23:4, 5), and also by the words and acts of Christ, the good Samaritan, pouring in oil and wine into the wounds of the traveller, representing human nature, lying in the road." 'Αδικήσῃς ἀδικεῖν in the Revelation invariably signifies "to injure," and, except in one case, takes the direct accusative after it (see Revelation 2:11; Revelation 7:2, 3; Revelation 9:4, 10, 19; Revelation 11:5). Nevertheless, Heinrich and Elliott render, "Do not commit injustice in the matter of the oil and wine". Theologian H. W. Rinek renders, "waste not". The vision is a general prophecy of the future for all time (see on verse 5); but many writers have striven to identify the fulfilment of the vision with someone particular famine.

== The Fifth Seal (6:9–11) ==
=== Verse 11 ===
And white robes were given unto every one of them; and it was said unto them, that they should rest yet for a little season, until their fellowservants also and their brethren, that should be killed as they were, should be fulfilled.

== The Sixth Seal (6:12–17) ==
=== Verse 12 ===
And I beheld when he had opened the sixth seal, and, lo, there was a great earthquake; and the sun became black as sackcloth of hair, and the moon became as blood;

== See also ==
- Four Horsemen of the Apocalypse
- Jesus
- John's vision of the Son of Man
- Names and titles of Jesus in the New Testament
- Seven seals
- Related Bible parts: Revelation 5, Revelation 7, Revelation 8

== Bibliography ==
- Bauckham, Richard (2007). "81. Revelation". In Barton, John; Muddiman, John (eds.). The Oxford Bible Commentary (first (paperback) ed.). Oxford University Press. pp. 1287–1306. ISBN 978-0199277186.
