= Papyrus 47 =

Papyrus 𝔓^{47}
- New Testament manuscript
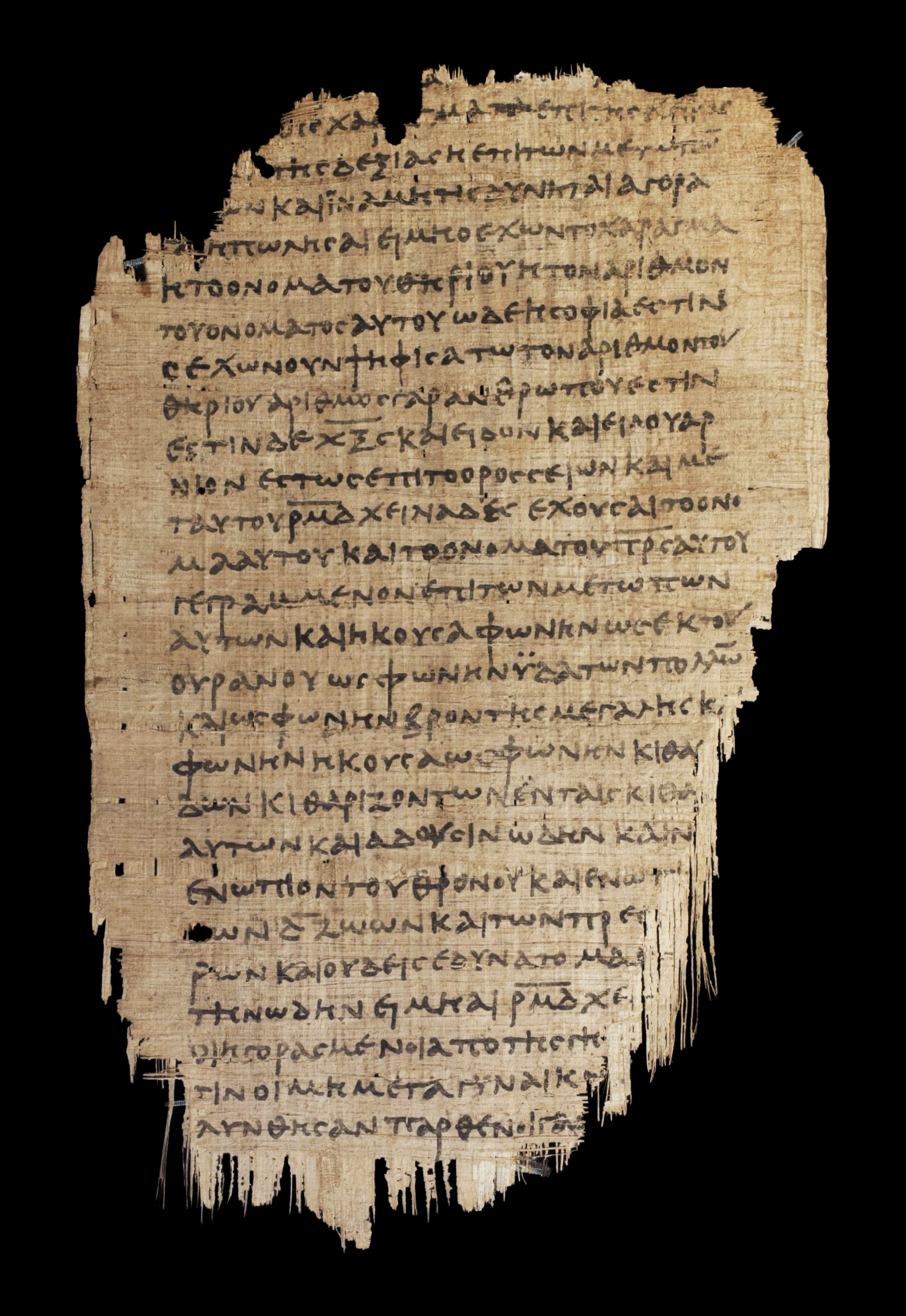
- Name: P. Chester Beatty III
- Sign: 𝔓47
- Text: Book of Revelation 9:10-17:2 †
- Date: c. 200-300
- Script: Greek
- Found: Egypt
- Now at: Chester Beatty Library
- Cite: F. G. Kenyon, The Chester Beatty Biblical Papyri III, (London, 1934).
- Type: Alexandrian text-type
- Category: I
- Note: close to Sinaiticus, 0308

Papyrus 47, also known as P. Chester Beatty III, is an early Greek New Testament manuscript written on papyrus, and is one of the manuscripts comprising the Chester Beatty Papyri. It is designated by the siglum 𝔓^{47} in the Gregory-Aland numbering of New Testament manuscripts. Manuscripts among the Chester Beatty Papyri have had several places of discovery associated with them, the most likely being the Faiyum. Using the study of comparative writing styles (palaeography), it has been dated to the early 3rd century CE. The manuscript contains text from the Book of Revelation chapters 9 through 17. It is currently housed at the Chester Beatty Library (Inv. 14. 1. 527) in Dublin.

In November 2020, the CSNTM in conjunction with Hendrickson Publishers released a new 1:1 high-resolution imaged facsimile edition of 𝔓^{47} on black and white backgrounds, along with 𝔓^{45} and 𝔓^{46}.

== Description ==
The manuscript is a codex (precursor to the modern book format), written with black ink on papyrus. The manuscript is quite fragmented, containing the text of Revelation 9:10-11:3; 11:5-16:15; and 16:17-17:2. The extant part of the manuscript comprises 10 leaves arranged as a single quire. The original size of the pages was 24x14cm, with around 23-30 lines each page The writing column was quite small, comprising 19x10cm, with 1-4 lines lost at the top of each page. Due to the first five leaves facing back to front (also known as verso to recto), and the last five leaves facing front to back (recto to verso), this is evidence the extant leaves are from the middle portion, and likely that only the book of Revelation was included in the manuscript. It is calculated that the manuscript likely had 30-32 leaves in total to house the text.

Biblical scholar Frederic Kenyon describes the writing as "rather rough in character, thick in formation, and with no pretensions to calligraphy." Based on the graphic style, he dated the manuscript to the 3rd century CE.

The manuscript evidences the following nomina sacra (names/titles considered sacred in Christianity, which received suspended abbreviations with a horizontal line above): Α̅Θ̅Ν̅ (ἀνθρώπων / man), Θ̅Σ̅ (θεός / God), Ι̅Υ̅ (Ἰησοῦ / Jesus), Κ̅Σ̅ (κύριος / Lord/Master), Π̅Ν̅Α̅ (πνεῦμα/τα / spirit or spirits), Π̅Ρ̅Σ̅ (πατρός / father), Χ̅Υ̅ (χριστοῦ / Christ/Messiah), Ε̅Σ̅Τ̅Ρ̅Ω̅ (ἐσταυρώθη / crucified).

== Text ==
The Greek text of this codex is considered a representative of the Alexandrian text-type. The text-types are groups of different manuscripts which share specific or generally related readings, which then differ from each other group, and thus the conflicting readings can separate out the groups, which are then used to determine the original text as published; there are three main groups with names: Alexandrian, Western, and Byzantine. Biblical scholar Kurt Aland ascribed it as a Normal text, and placed it in Category I of his New Testament manuscript classification system.

The text of this manuscript is closest to Codex Sinaiticus (א), and together they are witnesses for one of the early textual types of the Book of Revelation. Another type is represented by the manuscripts Papyrus 115 (𝔓^{115}), Codex Alexandrinus (A), and Codex Ephraemi (C). The text in 𝔓^{47}-א is considered to be an inferior witness to the text of Revelation as opposed to that of 𝔓^{115}-A-C.

== See also ==
- List of New Testament papyri
