= Alpha and Omega =

Christian symbol, first and last letters of the Greek alphabet

The Greek letters alpha and Omega

Alpha (Α, α) and Omega (Ω, ω) are the first and last letters of the Greek alphabet, and a title of Christ or God in the Book of Revelation. This pair of letters is used as a Christian symbol, and is often combined with the Cross, Chi Rho or other Christian symbols.

== Origin ==
The first written record of the phrase "alpha and omega" appears in ancient manuscripts of the Christian New Testament.

The phrase "I am the Alpha and the Omega" (Koiné Greek: ἐγώ εἰμί τὸ Ἄλφα καὶ τὸ Ὦ), is an appellation of Jesus and of the Father in the Book of Revelation (verses 1:8, 21:6, and 22:13). (Note: At this time, the Greek name of the letter was still 'Ô' (Ὦ), which is found in the earliest Greek manuscripts; the later name "omega" (Ὦ μέγα) is found in many later Greek manuscripts.) The first part of this phrase ("I am the Alpha and the Omega") is first found in chapter 1 verse 8, and is found in every manuscript of Revelation that has 1:8. Several later manuscripts repeat "I am the Alpha and the Omega" in 1:11 as well, but do not receive support here from most of the oldest manuscripts, including the Alexandrine, Sinaitic, and Codex Ephraemi Rescriptus. It is, therefore, omitted in some modern translations. Scholar Robert Young stated, with regard to "I am the Alpha and the Omega" in 1:11, the "oldest [manuscripts] omit" it.

A similar reference is found in Isaiah 44, where God is said to be the first and the last. Elsewhere in the New Testament, the phrase "I am" is used several times by Jesus, particularly in the Gospel of John.

== Christianity ==
Alpha (Α) and Omega (Ω) are the first and last letters, respectively, of the classical (Ionic) Greek alphabet. Thus, the phrase "I am the alpha and the omega" is further clarified with the additional phrase "the beginning and the end" in Revelation 21:6, 22:13, spoken by Jesus Christ to John the Divine. The first and last letters of the Greek alphabet were used because the book of Revelation is in the New Testament, which was originally written in Greek.

The phrase is interpreted by many Christians to mean that Jesus has existed for all totality and eternity or that God is eternal. Many commentators and dictionaries ascribe the title "the alpha and the omega" to both God and to Christ. Barnes' Notes on the New Testament (1974) claims: "It cannot be absolutely certain that the writer meant to refer to the Lord Jesus specifically here [...] There is no real incongruity in supposing, also, that the writer here meant to refer to God as such." Most Christian denominations also teach that the title applies to God (Jesus Christ, the Father and the Holy Spirit).

The letters Alpha and Omega, in juxtaposition, are often used as a Christian visual symbol (see examples). The symbols were used in early Christianity and appear in the Roman catacombs. The letters were shown hanging from the arms of the cross in Early Christian art, and some cruces gemmatae, jeweled crosses in precious metal, have formed letters hanging in this way, called pendilia; for example, in the Asturian coat of arms, which is based upon the Asturian Victory Cross. In fact, despite always being in Greek, the letters became more common in Western than Eastern Orthodox Christian art. They are often shown to the left and right of Christ's head, sometimes within his halo, where they take the place of the Christogram used in Orthodox art.

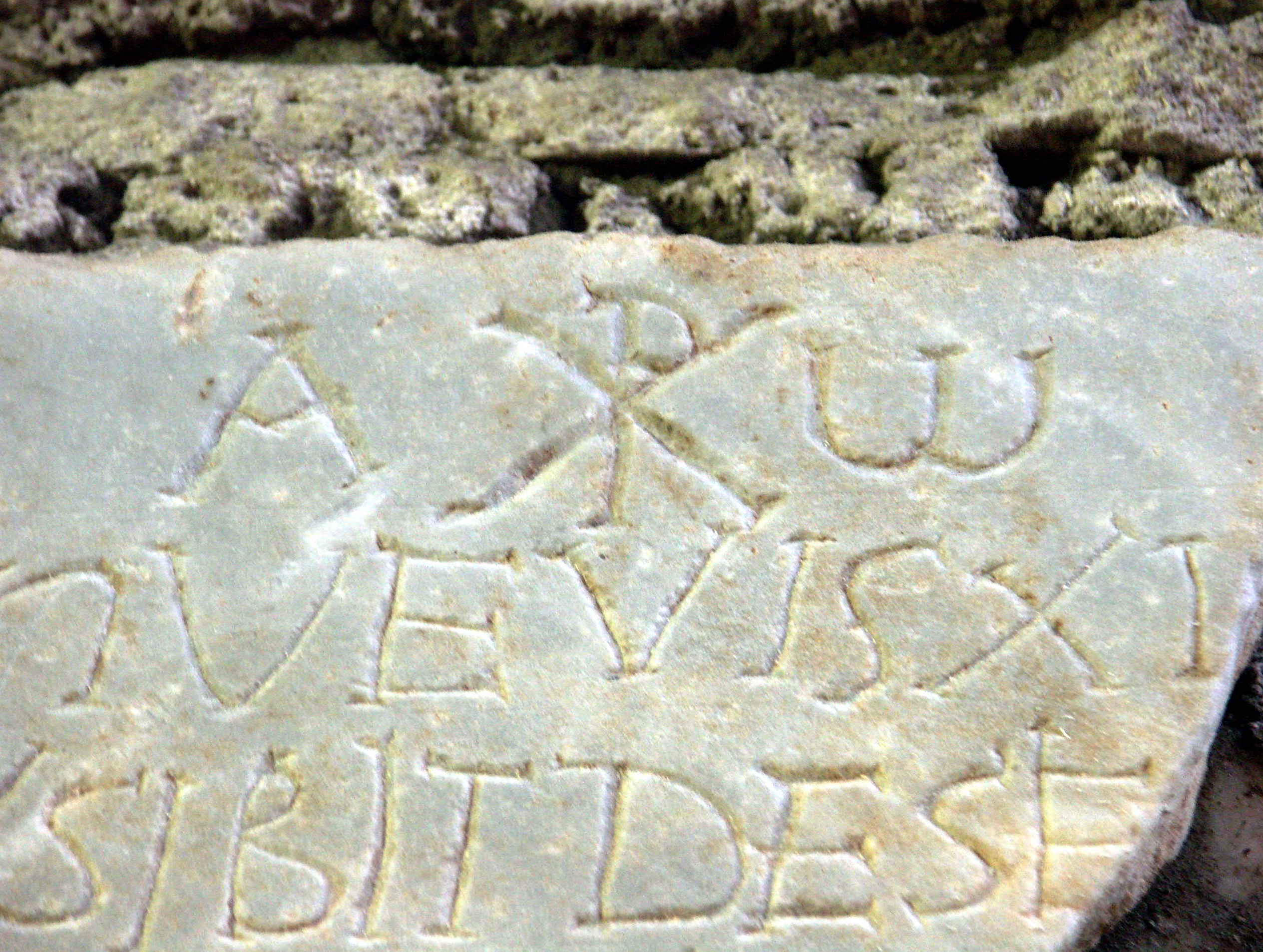
The Chi-rho symbol with Alpha and Omega, Catacombs of Domitilla, Rome

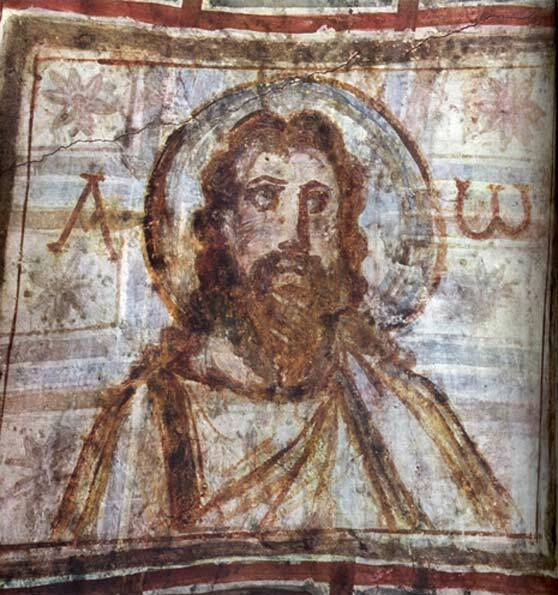
The Greek letters alpha and omega surround the halo of Jesus in the catacombs of Rome from the 4th century.

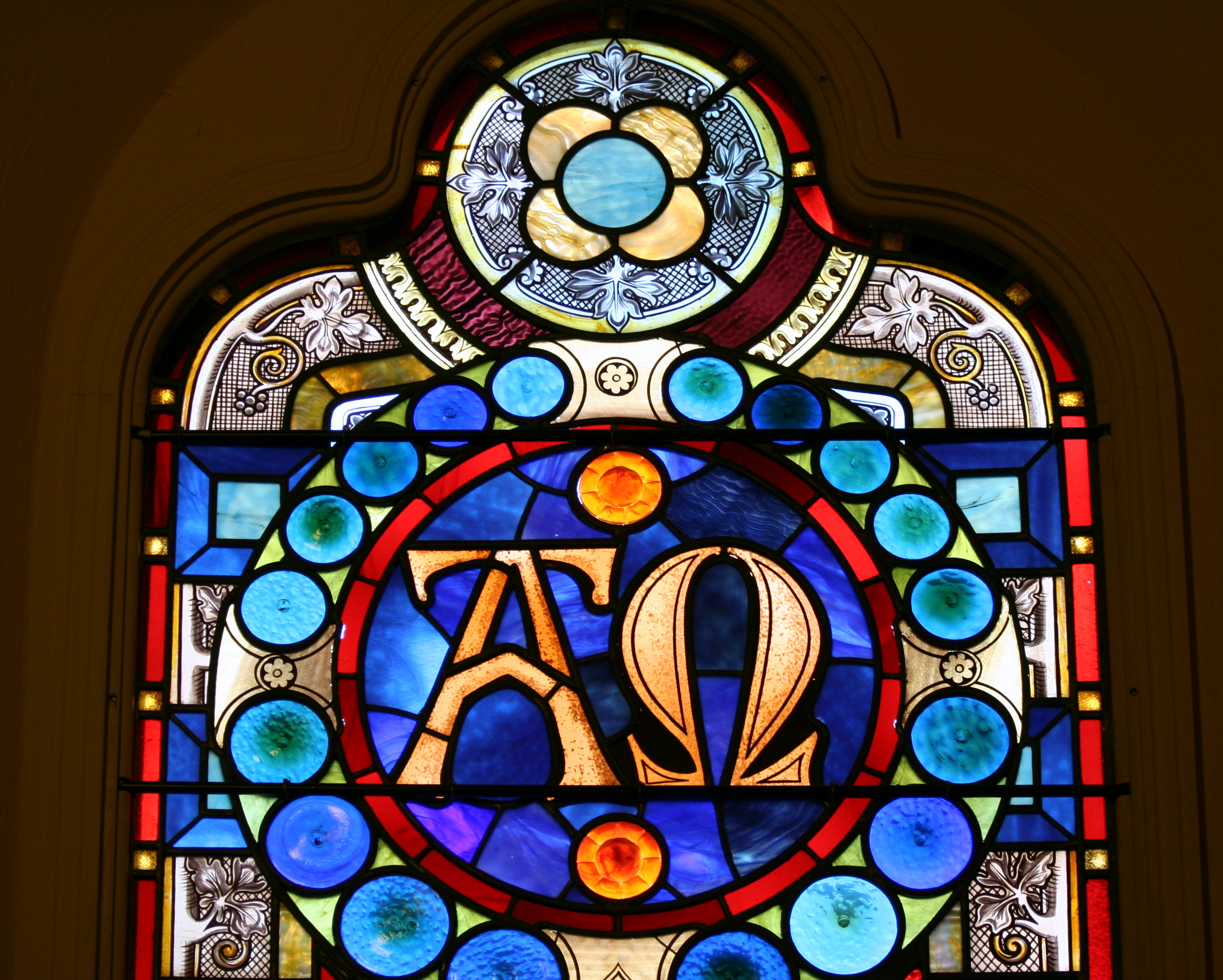
"ΑΩ" in stained glass

Arms with Alpha and Omega

Flag of Asturias

== Judaism ==
In Hebrew, the word emet (אמת, meaning 'truth'), is referred to as the "Seal of God." [Cf. Isaiah 44:6] The word is composed of the first, middle, and last letters of the Hebrew alphabet.

== Islam ==
The Qur'an gives al-ʾAwwal (ٱلْأَوَّل), meaning 'The First' and al-ʾĀkhir (ٱلْآخِر), meaning 'The Last', as two of the names of God (Quran 57:3).

== See also ==
- Alpha et Omega
- Attributes of God in Christianity
- Chi Rho
- Christian symbolism
- Names and titles of Jesus in the New Testament
- Names of God in Islam
- Names of God in Judaism
