= List of Christian synonyms =

Other ways to describe following Christianity or a follower of Christianity

In Christianity, there are a number of other words used to refer to Christians.

== In the New Testament ==
=== Christian ===
The word Christian is used three times in the New Testament: Acts 11:26, Acts 26:28, and 1 Peter 4:16. The original usage in all three New Testament verses reflects a derisive element in the term Christian to refer to followers of Christ who did not acknowledge the emperor of Rome.

=== Disciple ===
Disciple is common in the Gospels and Acts, and is the "characteristic name for those who gathered around Jesus during his ministry". It is a not used in the New Testament epistles.

=== Brother ===
The term brother occurs in verses like Acts 18:27. The King James Version renders the plural form used here as "brethren", while modern English versions have "brothers" (ESV) or "brothers and sisters" (NIV). The term comes from the theological concept of adoption, which says that believers are made part of God's family, and become his children. The use of "brother" as a designation for Christians has become restricted to members of religious communities (the Catholic sense), or as an honorific for pastors (often used in Baptist churches).

=== Saint ===
The Epistle to the Ephesians is written to the "saints at Ephesus" (Ephesians 1:1). In the New Testament the word is used to refer to Christians generally, but Robert S. Rayburn notes that "the name survived as a general title for Christians only through the second century." Rayburn suggests that the "juxtaposition of sainthood and martyrdom" in Revelation 17:6 may have resulted in the word becoming an "honorific title for confessors, martyrs and ascetics." In Orthodox and Catholic teachings, all Christians in heaven are considered to be saints, but some are considered to be worthy of higher honor, emulation, or veneration, with official church recognition given to some saints through canonization or glorification.

=== Believer ===
Belief in Jesus is a central aspect of Christianity. Rayburn notes that verses such as 2 Corinthians 6:15 "substantiate its technical use as a title for Christians".

=== Follower of the Way ===
In the Book of Acts, Christianity is referred to as "The Way". The NIV renders Paul's words in Acts 24:14 as "I admit that I worship the God of our ancestors as a follower of the Way, which they call a sect." Rayburn suggests that this was a Christian self-designation, although it did not survive as a title.

=== Friend ===
Rayburn notes that the phrase "the friends" (hoi philoi) occurs in Acts 27:3 and 3 John 15, but that it is uncertain whether this means "Christians in general or merely actual acquaintances". Rayburn goes on to note that the designation was used by the Friends of God and the Religious Society of Friends.

=== Nazarene ===
The title "Nazarene" is used once in the New Testament to refer to Christians, in Acts 24:5, where Tertullus calls Paul "a ringleader of the sect of the Nazarenes". In rabbinical and contemporary Israeli Hebrew, Notzrim is the general official term for Christians.

=== The elect ===
In Colossians 3:12 Paul calls Christians "the elect". "Put on therefore, as the elect of God, holy and beloved, bowels of mercies, kindness, humbleness of mind, meekness, longsuffering..."

== In later Christianity ==
=== Christ follower ===
"Christ follower" (rather than "Christian") has become the preferred self-designation for many people associated with the emerging church. This can also refer to Messianic Jews.

== See also ==
- Glossary of Christianity
- Names and titles of Jesus in the New Testament
- Xian (abbreviation)
