= Names and titles of Jesus in the New Testament =

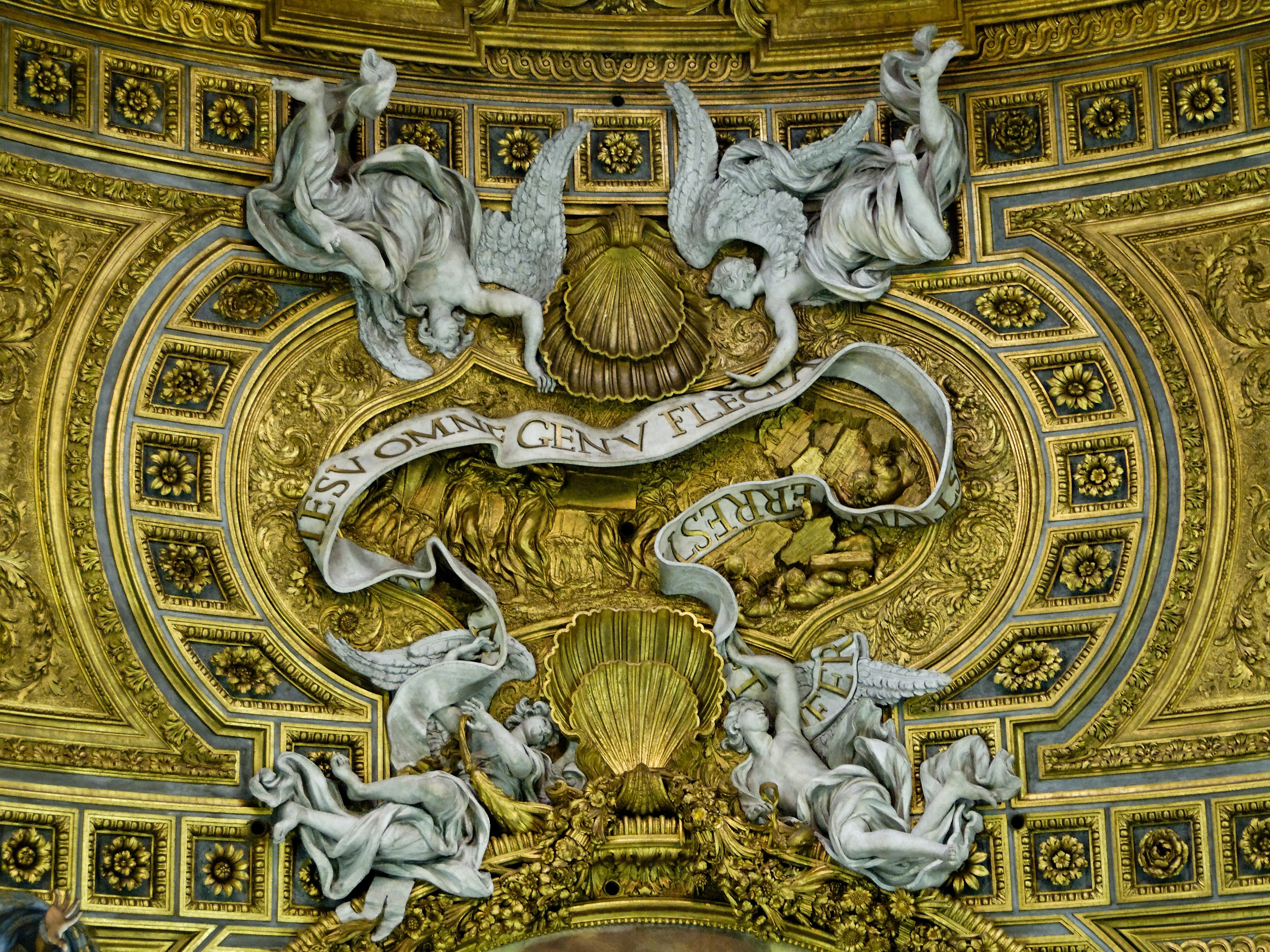
Latin inscription of Philippians 2:10: "At the name of Jesus every knee should bow", Church of the Gesù, Rome.

Two names and a variety of titles in the New Testament are used to refer to Jesus. In Christianity, the two names Jesus and Emmanuel that refer to Jesus in the New Testament have salvific attributes. After the crucifixion of Jesus the early Church did not simply repeat his messages, but focused on him, proclaimed him, and tried to understand and explain his message. One element of the process of understanding and proclaiming Jesus was the attribution of titles to him. Some of the titles that were gradually used in the early Church and then appeared in the New Testament were adopted from the Jewish context of the age, while others were selected to refer to, and underscore the message, mission and teachings of Jesus. In time, some of these titles gathered Christological significance.

Christians have attached theological significance to the Holy Name of Jesus. The use of the name of Jesus in petitions is stressed in John 16:23 when Jesus states: "If you ask the Father anything in my name he will give it you." There is widespread belief among Christians that the name Jesus is not merely a sequence of identifying symbols but includes intrinsic divine power.

== Names ==
=== Jesus ===
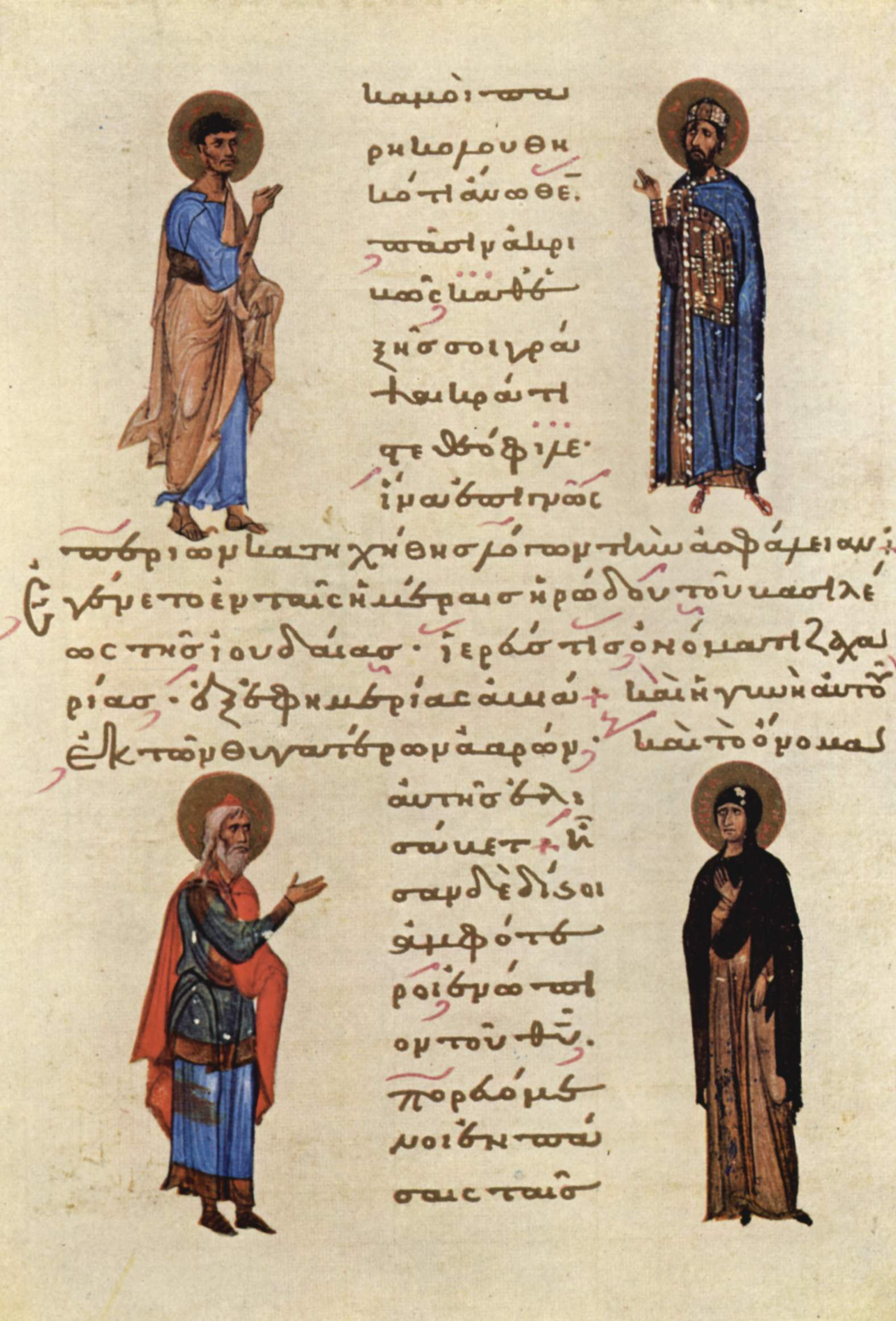
Beginning of a Byzantine copy of the Gospel of Luke, 1020. Luke 1:31 states: "... bring forth a son, and shalt call his name JESUS."

In the New Testament the name Jesus is given both in the Gospel of Luke and the Gospel of Matthew, and Emmanuel only in Matthew. In Luke 1:31 an angel tells Mary to name her child Jesus, and in Matthew 1:21 an angel tells Joseph to name the child Jesus. The statement in Matthew 1:21 "you shall call his name Jesus, for he will save his people from their sins" associates salvific attributes to the name Jesus in Christian theology.

Although the precise difference between a 'name' and a 'title' may be open to interpretation, 198 different names and titles of Jesus in the Bible are listed in Cruden's Concordance, first published in 1737, and continuously in print ever since. The first index of the book (following the royal dedications and author's preface) is entitled "A collection of the Names and Titles given to Jesus Christ", with 198 names listed, each accompanied by a biblical reference.

During his lifetime, when the need for specificity arose, a patronym or toponym would be added to his given name. These forms of address have been translated into English as "Jesus son of Joseph," "Jesus of Nazareth" and "Jesus the Nazarene."

==== Etymology ====
There have been a number of proposals as to the etymological origin of the name Jesus. The name is related to the Biblical Hebrew form Yehoshua`(יְהוֹשֻׁעַ), which is a theophoric name first mentioned in the Bible in Exodus 17:9 referring to one of Moses' companions and his successor as leader of the Israelites. This name is usually considered to be a compound of two parts: יהו Yeho, a theophoric reference to YHWH, the distinctive personal name of the God of Israel, plus a form derived from the Hebrew triconsonantal root y-š-ʕ or י-ש-ע "to liberate, save". There have been various proposals as to how the literal etymological meaning of the name should be translated, including:

- YHWH saves
- YHWH (is) salvation
- YHWH (is) a saving-cry
- YHWH (is) a cry-for-saving
- YHWH (is) a cry-for-help
- YHWH (is) my help

This early Biblical Hebrew name יְהוֹשֻׁעַ (Yehoshua`) underwent a shortening into later biblical יֵשׁוּעַ (Yeshua`), as found in the Hebrew text of verses Ezra 2:2, 2:6, 2:36, 2:40, 3:2, 3:8, 3:9, 3:10, 3:18, 4:3, 8:33; Nehemiah 3:19, 7:7, 7:11, 7:39, 7:43, 8:7, 8:17, 9:4, 9:5, 11:26, 12:1, 12:7, 12:8, 12:10, 12:24, 12:26; 1 Chronicles 24:11; and 2 Chronicles 31:15—as well as in Biblical Aramaic at verse Ezra 5:2. These Bible verses refer to ten individuals (in Nehemiah 8:17, the name refers to Joshua son of Nun). This historical change may have been due to a phonological shift whereby guttural phonemes weakened, including [h]. Usually, the traditional theophoric element Yahu יהו was shortened at the beginning of a name to יו [Yo-], and at the end to יה [-yah]. In the contraction of Yehoshua` to Yeshua`, the vowel is instead fronted (perhaps due to the influence of the y in triliteral root y-š-ʕ). During the post-biblical period, the name was also adopted by Aramaic and Greek-speaking Jews.

By the time the New Testament was written, the Septuagint had already transliterated ישוע (Yeshua`) into Koine Greek as closely as possible in the 3rd-century BCE, the result being Ἰησοῦς (Iēsous). Since Greek had no equivalent to the Semitic letter ש shin [sh], it was replaced with a σ sigma [s], and a masculine singular ending [-s] was added in the nominative case, in order to allow the name to be inflected for case (nominative, accusative, etc.) in the grammar of the Greek language. The diphthongal [a] vowel of Masoretic Yehoshua` or Yeshua` would not have been present in Hebrew/Aramaic pronunciation during this period, and some scholars believe some dialects dropped the pharyngeal sound of the final letter ע (`ayin) [`], which in any case had no counterpart in ancient Greek. The Greek writings of Philo of Alexandria and Josephus frequently mention this name. It also occurs in the Greek New Testament at Acts 7:45 and Hebrews 4:8, referring to Joshua son of Nun.

From Greek, Ἰησοῦς (Iēsous) moved into Latin at least by the time of the Vetus Latina. The morphological jump this time was not as large as previous changes between language families. Ἰησοῦς (Iēsous) was transliterated to Latin IESVS, where it stood for many centuries. The Latin name has an irregular declension, with a genitive, dative, ablative, and vocative of Jesu, accusative of Jesum, and nominative of Jesus. Minuscule (lower case) letters were developed around 800 AD and some time later the U was invented to distinguish the vowel sound from the consonantal sound and the J to distinguish the consonant from I. Similarly, Greek minuscules were invented about the same time, prior to that the name was written in capital letters: ΙΗϹΟΥϹ or abbreviated as: ΙΗϹ with a line over the top, see also Christogram.

Modern English Jesus /ˈdʒiːzəs/ derives from Early Middle English Iesu (attested from the 12th century). The name participated in the Great Vowel Shift in late Middle English (15th century). The letter J was first distinguished from 'I' by the Frenchman Pierre Ramus in the 16th century, but did not become common in Modern English until the 17th century, so that early 17th century works such as the first edition of the King James Version of the Bible (1611) continued to print the name with an I.

==== "Jesus" forms ====
"Jesu" is a remnant in modern English of the declension and use of grammatically inflected case endings with some proper nouns in Middle English, which persisted into Early Modern English to around the time of Shakespeare. The form Jesu is often a noun of address, "Jesu!", but may also stand for other cases, such as genitive, as in Latin. The form "Jesu" was preserved in hymns and poetry long after it had fallen out of general use in speech, for example in poet laureate Robert Bridges' translation of Johann Schop's wording for the English translation of Johann Sebastian Bach's cantata, Jesu, Joy of Man's Desiring and in T. S. Colvin's hymn, Jesu, Jesu, fill us with your love, based on a song from northern Ghana. During the late 19th century, as Jesu was increasingly seen as antiquated, some churches attempted to update the wording of hymns containing "Jesu" to "Jesus". In modernizing hymn texts the use of "Jesu's" or "Jesus'" could cause problems where the metre only allowed two syllables, "Je-su's".

==== Significance of the name ====
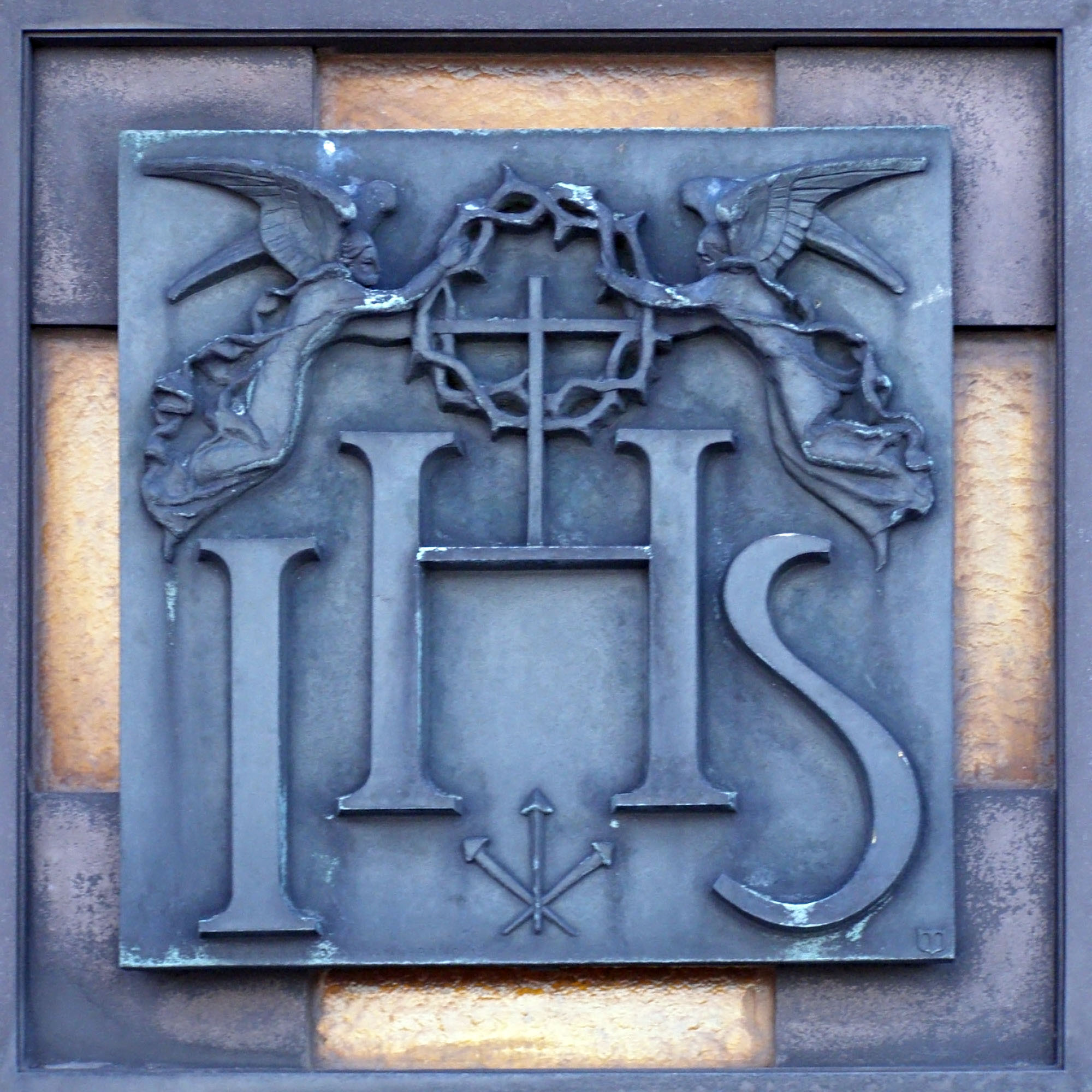
The IHS monogram with angels, in Hostýn, Czech Republic

Christians have attached theological significance to the name of Jesus from the earliest days of Christianity. Devotions to and feasts for the Holy Name of Jesus exist both in Eastern and Western Christianity. The devotions and venerations to the name Jesus also extend to the IHS monogram, derived from the Greek word for Jesus ΙΗΣΟΥΣ.

The significance of the name of Jesus in the New Testament is underscored by the fact that in his Nativity account Matthew pays more attention to the name of the child and its theological implications than the actual birth event itself.

Reverence for the name of Jesus is emphasized by Saint Paul in Philippians 2:10 where he states: "That in the name of Jesus every knee should bow, of those that are in heaven, on earth, and under the earth".

The use of the name of Jesus in petitions is stressed in John 16:23 when Jesus states: "If you ask the Father anything in my name he will give it you." Many Christian prayers thus conclude with the words: "Through Our Lord Jesus Christ". There is widespread belief among Christians that the name Jesus is not merely a sequence of identifying symbols but includes intrinsic divine power, and that where the name of Jesus is spoken or displayed the power of Jesus can be called upon.

=== Emmanuel ===
Matthew 1:23 ("they shall call his name Emmanuel") provides the name 'Emmanuel' (meaning God is with us). 'Emmanuel', which is taken from Isaiah 7:14, does not appear elsewhere in the New Testament.

The name 'Emmanuel' (also Immanuel or Imanu'el) of the Hebrew עִמָּנוּאֵל "God [is] with us" consists of two Hebrew words: אֵל (’El, meaning 'God') and עִמָּנוּ (ʻImmānū, meaning 'with us'); Standard Hebrew ʻImmanuʼel, Tiberian Hebrew ʻImmānûʼēl. It is a theophoric name used in the Bible in Isaiah 7:14 and Isaiah 8:8.

Some interpreters see Matthew 1:23 providing a key to Emmanuel Christology in the New Testament, with Matthew showing an interest in identifying Jesus as "God with us" and later developing the Emmanuel theme at key points throughout his Gospel. The name Emmanuel does not directly appear elsewhere in the New Testament, but Matthew builds on the motif in Matthew 28:20 to indicate that Jesus will be with the faithful to the end times. According to Ulrich Luz, the Emmanuel motif brackets the entire Gospel of Matthew between 1:23 and 28:20, appearing explicitly and implicitly in several other passages, setting the tone for the salvific theme of Matthew. Some Christians see the same meaning in Matthew 28:20 ("I am with you always, even unto the end of the world") indicates that Jesus will be with the faithful to the end of the age.

== Titles ==
=== Christ ===
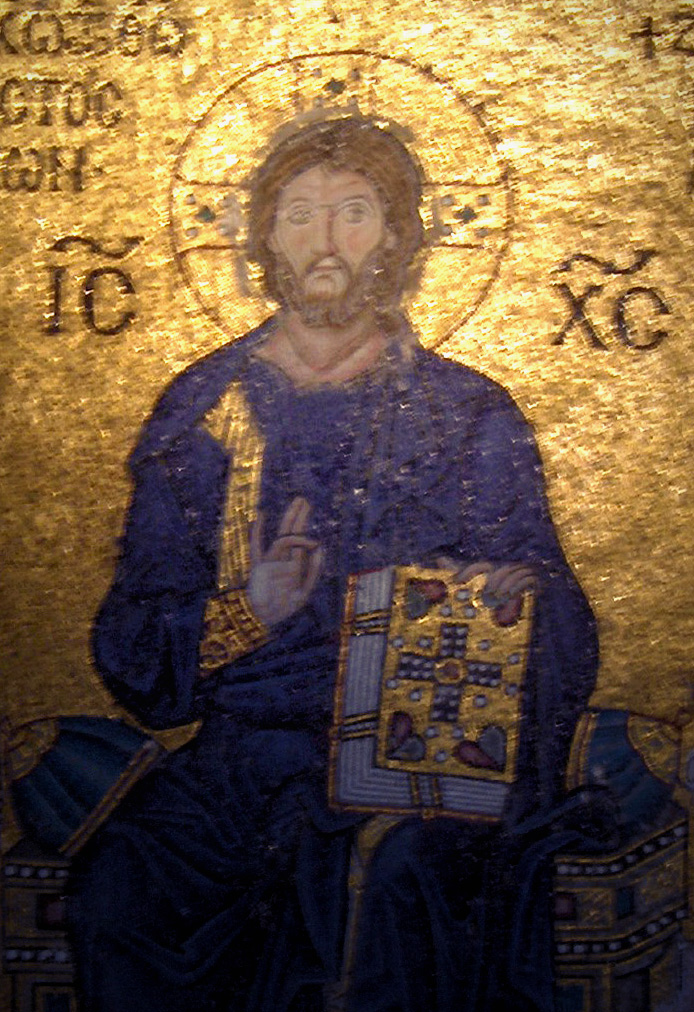
Mosaic of Christ Pantocrator with the Christogram IC XC

The title "Christ" used in the English language is from the Greek Χριστός (Christos), via the Latin Christus. It means "anointed one". The Greek is a loan translation of the Hebrew mashiaħ (מָשִׁיחַ) or Aramaic mshiħa (מְשִׁיחָא), from which the English word messiah is derived. "Christ" has now become a name, one part of the name "Jesus Christ", but originally it was a title ("the Messiah") and not a name; however its use in the phrase "Christ Jesus" is a title.

The Greek-language Septuagint version of the Hebrew Bible (translated over a century before the time of Jesus), used the word Christos to express in Greek the Hebrew word mashiach (messiah), meaning "anointed". (Another Greek word, Messias, appears in Daniel 9:26 and Psalm 2:2.) The New Testament states that the long-awaited Messiah had come and describes this savior as the Christ. In Matthew 16:16, the Apostle Peter—in what has become a famous proclamation of faith among Christians since the first century—said, "You are the Christ, the Son of the living God." In John 11:27 Martha tells Jesus "you are the Christ", just before the raising of Lazarus.

In the Pauline Epistles the word Christ is so closely associated with Jesus that it is apparent that for the early Christians there is no need to claim that Jesus is Christ, for that is considered widely accepted among them. Hence Paul can use the term Christos with no confusion as to whom it refers to, and as in First Corinthians 4:15 and Romans 12:5 he can use expressions such as "in Christ" to refer to the followers of Jesus.

Canonical biblical texts lack any account of a formal literal anointing of Jesus as "Christ" with the traditional oil (or chrism). Christological thought may interpret the baptism of Jesus in water by John the Baptist (Matthew 3:16) as a metaphorical anointing carried out in the light of Isaiah 61:1 – "the Lord hath anointed me to preach good tidings".

Early followers of Jesus, who soon became known as "Christians" (Greek: Χρῑστῐᾱνοί, romanized: Christianoi) after the title Christos, developed symbols for representing Christ (i.e. Christograms) – for example, the Chi Rho symbol, formed by superimposing the first two Greek letters in "Christ" ( Greek : "Χριστός" ): chi = ch (Greek: Χ) and rho = r (Greek: Ρ), to produce ☧.

=== Lord ===
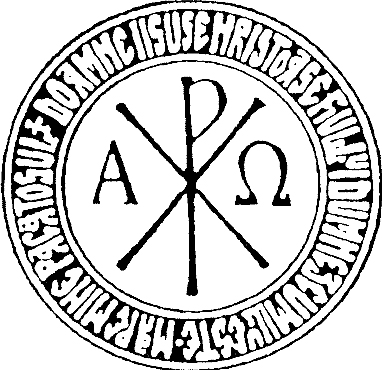
The Chi Rho circled with the Prayer: "Lord Jesus Christ, Son of God, have mercy on me".

Early Christians viewed Jesus as "the Lord" and the Greek word Kyrios (κύριος) which may mean God, lord or master appears 775 times in the New Testament, referring to him. In everyday Aramaic, Mari was a very respectful form of polite address, well above "Teacher" and similar to Rabbi. In Greek this has at times been translated as Kyrios. While the term Mari expressed the relationship between Jesus and his disciples during his life, the Greek Kyrios came to represent his lordship over the world.

Pauline writings further established the various theological consequences of the Lord/Kyrios concept among early Christians, and emphasized the attributes of Jesus as not only referring to his eschatological victory, but to him as the "divine image" (Greek εἰκών eikōn) in whose face the glory of God shines forth. In Romans 10:9–13 Paul emphasized the salvific value of the title, and stated that confessing by mouth (homologeo) the belief that Jesus is Lord (Kyrion Iesoun) signifies one's salvation.

The high frequency of the use of the term Kyrios in the Acts of the Apostles indicates how natural it was for early Christians to refer to Jesus in this way. This title persisted among Christians as the predominant perception of Jesus for a number of centuries.

The use of the Kyrios title for Jesus is central to the development of New Testament Christology, for the early Christians placed it at the center of their understanding and from that center attempted to understand the other issues related to the Christian mysteries. The question of the deity of Christ in the New Testament is inherently related to the Kyrios title of Jesus used in the early Christian writings and its implications for the absolute lordship of Jesus. In early Christian belief, the concept of Kyrios included the pre-existence of Christ for they believed that if Christ is one with God, he must have been united with God from the very beginning.

The title, even in the Greek form, continues to be widely used in Christian liturgy, e.g. in the Kyrie eleison, Christe eleison combination (i.e. Lord have mercy, Christ have mercy), where Jesus is referred to as Lord in one case, and as Christ immediately thereafter.

=== Master ===
The Greek word Epistates (Epistata in the vocative case) is used only in Luke's gospel, where it occurs six times. Robert O'Toole argues that the word relates to Jesus' power over the material world rather than his teaching. Some commentators suggest that in Luke 5, Peter progresses from seeing Jesus as "Master" (v. 5) to seeing him as "Lord" (v. 8).

=== Logos (the Word) ===
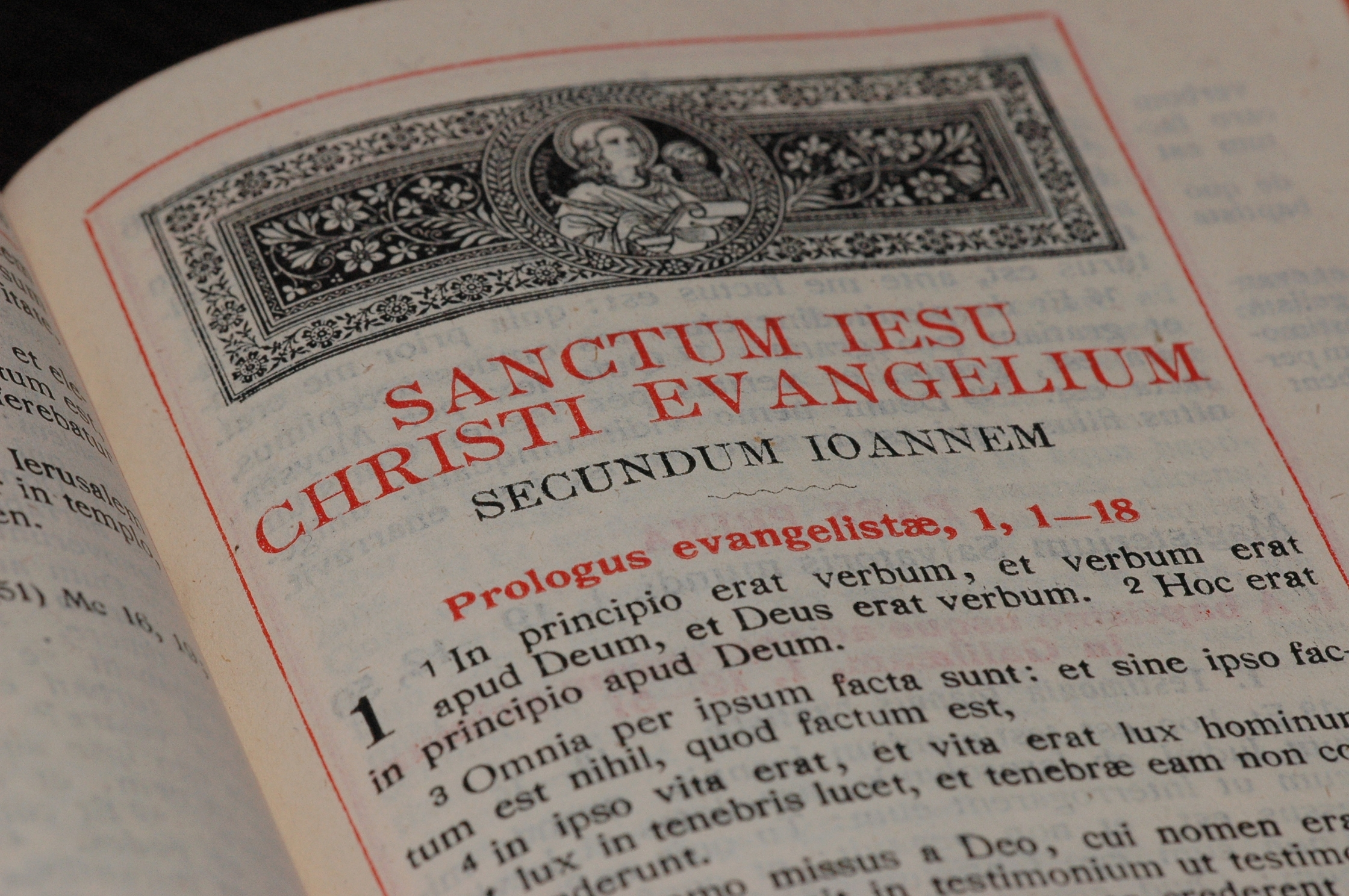
In principio erat verbum, Latin for At the beginning there was the Word. John 1:1-18 from the Clementine Vulgate

John 1:1-18 calls Jesus the Logos (Greek λόγος), often used as "the Word" in English translations. The identification of Jesus as the Logos which became Incarnate appears only at the beginning of the Gospel of John and the term Logos/Word is used only in two other Johannine passages: 1 John 1:1 and Revelation 19:13. It appears nowhere else in the New Testament.

The series of statements regarding the Logos at the very beginning of the Gospel of John build on each other. The statement that the Logos existed "at the beginning" asserts that as Logos Jesus was an eternal being like God. The statement that the Logos was "with God" asserts the distinction of Jesus from God. The statement that the Logos "was God" states the unity of Jesus with God the Father, thus stating his divinity as God the Son.

In 1 John 1:1 the arrival of the Logos as "the Word of life" from the beginning is emphasized and 1 John 5:6 builds on it to emphasize the water and blood of incarnation. With the use of the title Logos, Johannine Christology consciously affirms the belief in the divinity of Jesus: that he was God who came to be among men as the Word Incarnate.

Although as of the 2nd century the use of the title Logos gave rise to debate between the Alexandrian and Antiochian schools of thought regarding the interaction of the human and divine elements in the Person of Christ, after the First Council of Nicaea in 325 and Council of Chalcedon in 451 the Logos and the second person of the Trinity were often used interchangeably.

=== Son of God ===
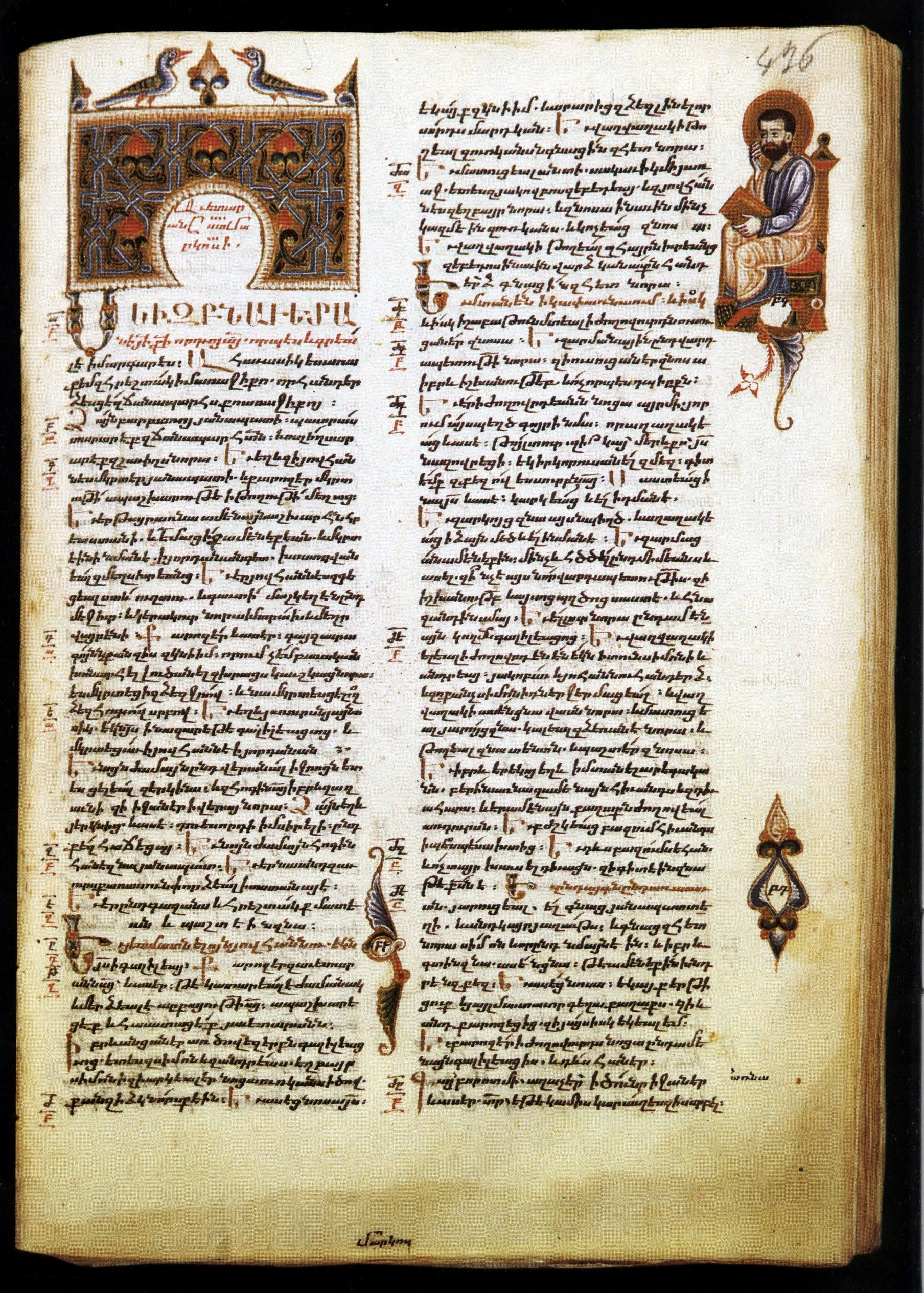
First page of Mark: "The beginning of the gospel of Jesus Christ, the Son of God", by Sargis Pitsak 14th century.

The title "Son of God" is applied to Jesus in many cases in the New Testament. It is often used to refer to his divinity, from the beginning in the Annunciation up to the Crucifixion. The declaration that Jesus is the Son of God is made by many individuals in the New Testament, on two separate occasions by God the Father as a voice from Heaven, and is also asserted by Jesus himself. The Son of God title, according to most Christian denominations, Trinitarian in belief, refers to the relationship between Jesus and God, specifically as "God the Son".

For thousands of years, emperors and rulers ranging from the Western Zhou dynasty (c. 1000 B.C.) in China to Alexander the Great in Greece have assumed titles that reflect a filial relationship with deities. At the time of Jesus, Roman Emperor Augustus exploited the similarity between the titles Divi filius (son of the Divine One) and "Dei filius" (Son of God) and used the ambiguous inscription "DF" to refer to himself to emphasize the divine component of his image. J. D. Crossan argues that early Christians adopted this title.

The Gospel of Mark begins by calling Jesus the Son of God and reaffirms the title twice when a voice from Heaven calls Jesus "my beloved Son" in Mark 1:11 and Mark 9:7. In Matthew 14:33, after Jesus walks on water, the disciples tell Jesus: "You really are the Son of God!" In Matthew 27:43, while Jesus hangs on the cross, the Jewish leaders mock him to ask God help, "for he said, I am the Son of God", referring to the claim of Jesus to be the Son of God. Matthew 27:54 and Mark 15:39 include the exclamation by the Roman commander, "He was surely the Son of God!", after the earthquake following the Crucifixion of Jesus. When, in Matthew 16:15–16, Apostle Peter states, "You are Christ, the Son of the living God", Jesus not only accepts the titles, but calls Peter "blessed" and declares the profession a divine revelation, unequivocally declaring himself to be both Christ and the Son of God in Matthew 16:15-16.

In the New Testament, Jesus uses the term "my Father" as a direct and unequivocal assertion of his sonship, and a unique relationship with the Father beyond any attribution of titles by others, e.g., in Matthew 11:27, John 5:23 and John 5:26. In a number of other episodes, Jesus claims sonship by referring to the Father, e.g., in Luke 2:49, when he is found in the temple, a young Jesus calls the temple "my Father's house", just as he does later in John 2:16 in the Cleansing of the Temple episode. In Matthew 1:11 and Luke 3:22, Jesus allows himself to be called the Son of God by the voice from above, not objecting to the title.

Of all the Christological titles used in the New Testament, Son of God has had one of the most lasting impacts in Christian history and has become part of the profession of faith by many Christians. In the mainstream Trinitarian context, the title implies the full divinity of Jesus as part of the Holy Trinity of Father, Son and the Spirit. However, the concept of God as the father of Jesus and Jesus as the one and only Son of God is distinct from the concept of God as the Creator and father of all people, as indicated in the Apostles' Creed. The profession begins with expressing belief in the "Father almighty, creator of heaven and earth" and then immediately, but separately, in "Jesus Christ, his only Son, our Lord", thus expressing both senses of fatherhood within the Creed.

=== Son of man ===
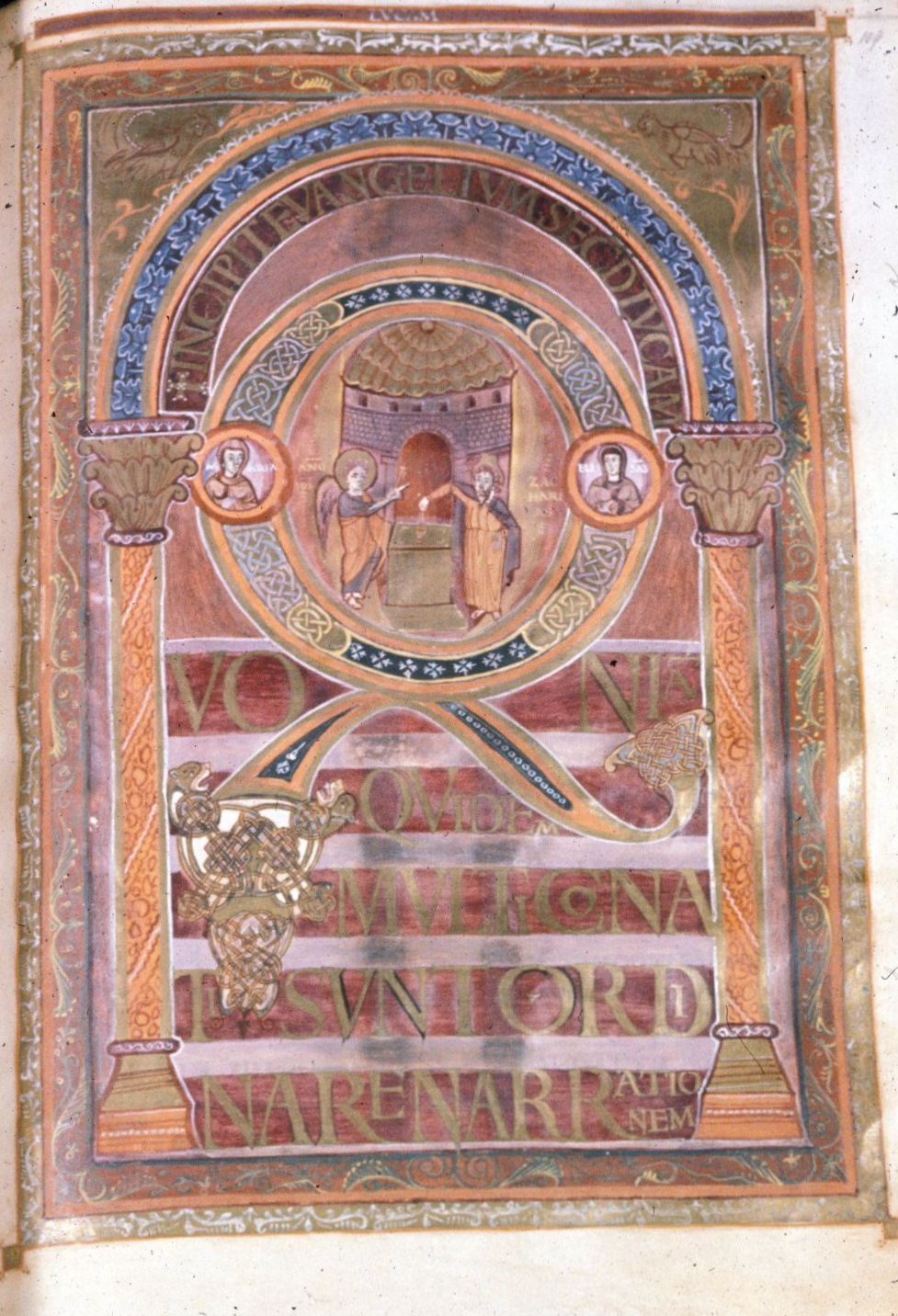
"Son of man" appears 25 times in Luke, a copy c. 800 shown here.

The term son of man appears many times in all four gospel accounts, e.g. 30 times in Matthew. However, unlike the title son of God, its proclamation has never been an article of faith in Christianity. While the profession of Jesus as the son of God has been an essential element of Christian creeds since the Apostolic Age, such professions do not apply to son of man. Yet, the Christological analysis of the relationship between the two terms has been the subject of much research.

In modern biblical research the occurrences of son of man in the Synoptic gospels are generally categorized into three groups: those that refer to his "coming" (as an exaltation), those that refer to "suffering" and those that refer to "now at work", i.e. referring to the earthly life.

The presentation in the Gospel of John is somewhat different from the Synoptics and in John 1:51 he is presented as contact with God through "angelic instrumentality", in John 6:26 and 6:53 he provides life through his death and in John 5:27 he holds the power to judge men. The first chapter of the Book of Revelation refers to "one like unto a son of man" in Revelation 1:12–13 which radiantly stands in glory and speaks to the author. In the Gospel of John Jesus is not just a messianic figure, nor a prophet like Moses, but the key emphasis is on his dual role as son of God and son of man.

Although the son of man is distinct from the son of God, some gospel passages equate them in some cases, e.g. in Mark 14:61, during the Sanhedrin trial of Jesus when the high priest asked Jesus: "Art thou the Christ, the Son of the Blessed?" Jesus responded "I am: and ye shall see the Son of man sitting at the right hand of Power, and coming with the clouds of heaven." This builds on the statement in Mark 9:31 that "The Son of man is delivered up into the hands of men, and they shall kill him; and when he is killed, after three days he shall rise again." In the parable of the Sheep and the Goats, the returning son of man has the power to judge, by separating men from "all the nations" into distinct groups, in Matthew 25:31–46.

For centuries, the Christological perspective on son of man has been a natural counterpart to that of son of God and in many cases affirms the humanity of Jesus just as son of God affirms his divinity. In the 5th century, Saint Augustine viewed the duality of son of God and son of man in terms of the dual nature of Christ in hypostatic union, in that the son of God became the son of man through the act of incarnation and wrote: "Since he is the only Son of God by nature, he became also the Son of Man that he might be full of grace as well."

Geza Vermes has argued that "the son of man" in the Gospels is unrelated to these Hebrew Bible usages. He begins with the observation that there is no example of "the" son of man in Hebrew sources. He suggests that the term originates in Aramaic—bar nash/bar nasha. Based on his study of Aramaic sources, he concludes that in these sources: (1) "Son of man" is a regular expression for man in general. (2) It often serves as an indefinite pronoun ("one" or "someone"). (3) In certain circumstances it may be employed as a circumlocution. In monologues or dialogues the speaker can refer to himself, not as 'I', but as "the son of man" in the third person, in contexts implying awe, reserve, or modesty. (4) In none of the extant texts does "son of man" figure as a title.

James E. Talmage, a prominent writer and leader in The Church of Jesus Christ of Latter-day Saints argued that the definitive article used in the New Testament makes the title "the Son of Man" a distinguishing appellation exclusive to Jesus. Talmage supports the view of Vermes, but adds to it the additional meaning that Jesus is the son of an exalted man, subscribing to the Church's doctrine of Exaltation. In this sense, too, the title is unique to Jesus, as he is the only literal physical offspring of God the Father.

No discussion of the title "Son of Man" (בר אנש) is complete without reference to the appearance of the term in the seventh chapter of the biblical book of Daniel. Daniel 7:13-14 in the English Standard Version reads,

I saw in the night visions, and behold, with the clouds of heaven there came one like a son of man, and he came to the Ancient of Days and was presented before him. And to him was given dominion and glory and a kingdom, that all peoples, nations, and languages should serve him; his dominion is an everlasting dominion, which shall not pass away, and his kingdom one that shall not be destroyed.

In the context of this vision, Daniel is troubled and approaches someone standing there with him observing this bequeathal of kingship at the Throne of the Ancient of Days. The heavenly by-stander explains the import of the vision in the following words:

And the kingdom and the dominion and the greatness of the kingdoms under the whole heaven shall be given to the people of the saints of the Most High; his kingdom shall be an everlasting kingdom, and all dominions shall serve and obey him (Daniel 7:27, ESV).

Here the term son of man is explained in three distinct ways: 1) as "the people of the saints of the Most High," 2) as a single entity in the words "his kingdom" and "serve and obey him," and 3) as "the Most High" Himself where it says "the Most High; his kingdom." Furthermore, the passage presents a contextual time frame for the events envisioned—the time of the "fourth kingdom on earth" (Daniel 7:23). The most traditional and widespread view is that the fourth kingdom represents the Roman governmental system. With the establishment of Christianity under this Roman governmental system, the Christian Churches came to identify the son of man in Daniel 7 as Jesus the Christ. The Apostle Paul describes the corporate nature of the Son of Man envisioned in Daniel 7 when he writes to the Church at Corinth, saying,

For just as the body is one and has many members, and all the members of the body, though many, are one body, so it is with Christ (First Corinthians 12:12, ESV).

The Pauline epistles depict Christ as the Head of His people the Church (Ephesians 1:15-23; Colossians 1:13-18). The New Testament identifies Jesus the Christ as the Most High, Whose Name is above all names (Philippians 2:9-10). The Gospel of Mark, often claimed by modern scholarship to be the first and earliest of the Four Gospels, identifies Jesus Christ as the LORD God of Israel by reference to the Tetragrammaton at the beginning of his Gospel:

The beginning of the gospel of Jesus Christ, the Son of God. As it is written in Isaiah the prophet, “Behold, I send my messenger before your face, who will prepare your way, the voice of one crying in the wilderness: ‘Prepare the way of the Lord, make his paths straight’” (Mark 1:1-3, ESV).

From the context, it is evident that Mark is identifying "my messenger" as John the Baptist, sent to prepare the way of Jesus Christ. The Sender of the messenger is God. When it says "before your face, who will prepare your way," the context confirms Mark as speaking of the face of Jesus Christ and of preparing Jesus Christ's way. The most striking element of this passage, however, is the equivalency Mark draws between the way of Jesus Christ and "the way of the Lord" (τὴν ὁδὸν Κυρίου). The implication is that Jesus Christ is the Lord (Κύριος). This reference to the way of the Lord is taken from the prophet Isaiah 40:3:

A voice cries: “In the wilderness prepare the way of the LORD; make straight in the desert a highway for our God (ESV).

In the Hebrew texts, "the way of the LORD" is "the way of Y-WH," using the Holy Tetragrammaton, the Divine Name of the God of Israel revealed to Moses on Mount Sinai (Exodus 3:13-15). In this way the Gospel according to Mark identifies Jesus as both Messiah and the LORD God of Israel. Likewise, the most Jewish Gospel of Matthew, held to be the first Gospel according to the tradition of the Christian Church, identifies Jesus Christ as "the Son of Man" and "the Son of the Living God" (Matthew 16:13), the Son of the Virgin and as God with us (Matthew 1:23). So in Orthodox Christian theology, Jesus Christ is both Most High and Son of Man, whose mystical Body is the Church, and "of His Kingdom there shall be no end" (Luke 1:33; Nicene Creed). According to Christian theology, the faithful of Christ will reign with Him over sin, death, and corruption both in this life and in the next (Romans 5:17; 2 Timothy 2:12). This unfolding kingdom is held by Christians to be the fulfillment of the Son-of-Man vision recorded in Daniel 7.

=== Son of David ===
The title "Son of David" indicates Jesus' physical descent from David, as well as his membership of the Davidic line of kings, establishing the claim of Jesus Christ to the Davidic Throne based on the promises God made to King David through Nathan the prophet when David was hoping to build God a house, or temple:

Moreover, the LORD declares to you that the LORD will make you a house. When your days are fulfilled and you lie down with your fathers, I will raise up your offspring after you, who shall come from your body, and I will establish his kingdom. He shall build a house for my name, and I will establish the throne of his kingdom forever. I will be to him a father, and he shall be to me a son. When he commits iniquity, I will discipline him with the rod of men, with the stripes of the sons of men, but my steadfast love will not depart from him, as I took it from Saul, whom I put away from before you. And your house and your kingdom shall be made sure forever before me. Your throne shall be established forever (2 Samuel 7:11-16).

This promise assures King David of an ongoing royal lineage forever that cannot be thwarted or annulled through human sin. The Promised Offspring par excellence will build a House for God, will reign on an Eternal Throne, will be called the "son" of God, and will be chastened with beating should he commit iniquity. One might well ask what would be the result for humankind if a Son of David who is sinless were to be beaten with "the stripes of the sons of men." Would it result in Divine judgment or Divine mercy? The Apostle Paul seems to answer this question in his Epistle to the Romans:

Paul, a servant of Christ Jesus, called to be an apostle, set apart for the gospel of God, which he promised beforehand through his prophets in the holy Scriptures, concerning his Son, who was descended from David according to the flesh and was declared to be the Son of God in power according to the Spirit of holiness by his resurrection from the dead, Jesus Christ our Lord, through whom we have received grace and apostleship to bring about the obedience of faith for the sake of his name among all the nations, including you who are called to belong to Jesus Christ, To all those in Rome who are loved by God and called to be saints: Grace to you and peace from God our Father and the Lord Jesus Christ (Romans 1:1-7, ESV).

According to the Apostle Paul, the unjust death of the Son of God and His resurrection from the dead result in grace, peace, and an increasing faithful obedience among all nations through the proclamation of the Gospel. The Kingdom of the Son of David, Jesus Christ, is portrayed in the New Testament as being current as He reigns at the right hand of the Father (Hebrews 8:1; Revelation 2:26-27; 20:4-6). It should be no surprise to anyone familiar with the Scriptures that the Throne of the LORD is the same as the Throne of David because these are equated in First Chronicles 29:23. The Messianic vision of Isaiah in Isaiah chapter 11 is envisioned in the New Testament as spreading gradually toward a final culmination (Matthew 13:33; Luke 17:20-21).

The phrase "Son of David" is used a number of times in the gospel of Matthew. It appears in Matthew 1:1 to introduce both the genealogy and the gospel. It is found on the lips of the blind men healed in Galilee ("Have mercy on us, Son of David", Matthew 9:27), the crowd who are amazed at Jesus' healing of a blind, mute and demon-possessed man Matthew 12:23), the Canaanite woman whose daughter is exorcised ("Lord, Son of David, have mercy on me," Matthew 15:22), and the blind men healed near Jericho ("Lord, Son of David, have mercy on us", Matthew 20:30). It also forms part of the shout of the crowds when Jesus enters Jerusalem: "Hosanna to the Son of David" (Matthew 21:9). Other references with the same use include Mark 10:48 and Mark 12:35. A variant of this title is found in Revelation 22:16, where Jesus refers to himself as "the Root and the Offspring of David". According to Anglican Bishop Charles Ellicott, "Son of David" was "the most popular of all the names of the expected Christ".

=== Son of Joseph ===
Jesus was referred to as the Son of Joseph in the genealogy accounts of Matthew and Luke.

=== Lamb of God ===
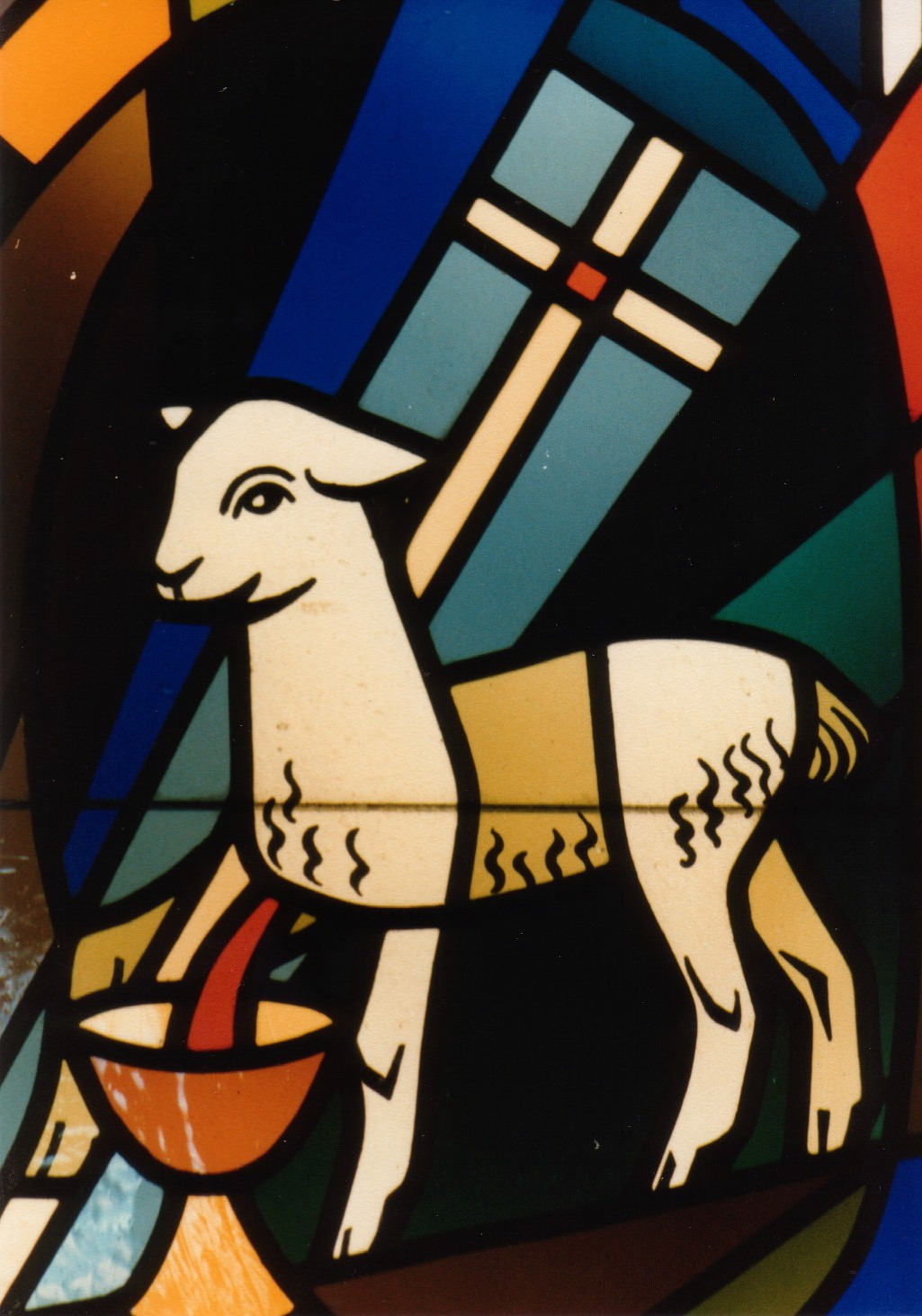
A typical depiction of Agnus Dei, bleeding into a Holy Chalice and carrying a Christian victory banner

The title Lamb of God (Agnus Dei) only appears in the Gospel of John, with the exclamation of John the Baptist: "Behold the Lamb of God who takes away the sins of the world" in John 1:29, the title reaffirmed the next day in John 1:36. The second use of the title Lamb of God takes place in the presence of the first two apostles of Jesus, who immediately follow him, address him as Rabbi with respect and later in the narrative bring others to meet him.

These two proclamations of Jesus as the Lamb of God closely bracket the Baptist's other proclamation in John 1:34: "I have borne witness that this is the Son of God". From a Christological perspective, these proclamations and the descent of the Holy Spirit as a dove in John 1:32 reinforce each other to establish the divine element of the Person of Christ. In Johannine Christology the proclamation "who takes away the sins of the world" begins the unfolding of the salvific theme of the redemptive and sacrificial death of Jesus, followed by his resurrection, which is built upon in other proclamations such as "this is indeed the Saviour of the world" uttered by the Samaritans in John 4:42.

Paul refers to "Christ, our Passover lamb" in 1 Corinthians 5:7; however, nothing in the context of this passage directly implies that Paul refers in that specific wording to the death of Jesus using the same theme.

The Book of Revelation includes over twenty references to a lion-like lamb ("slain but standing") which delivers victory in a manner reminiscent of the resurrected Christ. In the first appearance of the lamb in Revelation (5:1-7) only the lamb (which is of the tribe of Judah, and the root of David) is found worthy to take the judgment scroll from God and break the seals. In Revelation 21:14 the lamb is said to have twelve apostles.

The theme of a sacrificial lamb which rises in victory as the Resurrected Christ was employed in early Christology, e.g. in 375 Saint Augustine wrote: "Why a lamb in his passion? For he underwent death without being guilty of any inequity. Why a lion in his resurrection? For in being slain, he slew death." The Lamb of God title has found widespread use in Christian prayers and the Agnus Dei ("Lamb of God who take away the sins of the world have mercy on us; Lamb of God who take away the sins of the world grant us peace") is used both in liturgy and as a form of contemplative prayer. It references the concept of a scapegoat, where people put their blame on others, however with the interpretation of Jesus taking on Christian's sins.

=== New Adam / Second Adam / Last Adam ===
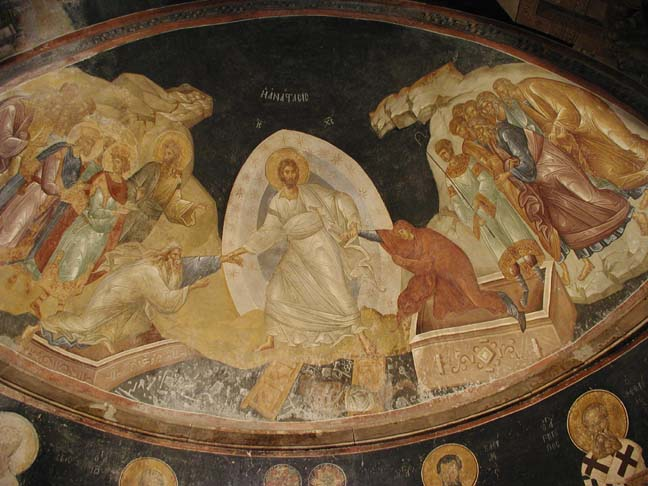
The Resurrected Jesus pulls Adam and Eve out of their graves, with Satan bound in Hell, Chora Church, Istanbul, c. 1315.

Just as in Adam all of us died, so too in Christ all of us will be brought to life.

— 1 Corinthians 15:22

Just as the Gospel of John proclaims the universal relevance of the Incarnation of Jesus as Logos, the Pauline view emphasizes the cosmic view that his birth, Crucifixion and Resurrection brought forth a new man and a new world. Paul's eschatological view of Jesus counter-positions him as a new man of morality and obedience, in contrast to Adam. Unlike Adam, the new man born in Jesus obeys God and ushers in a world of morality and salvation.

In the Pauline view, Adam is positioned as the first man and Jesus as the second and last Adam (1 Corinthians 15:45), the first having corrupted himself by his disobedience, also infected humanity and left it with a curse as inheritance. The birth of Jesus, on the other hand, counterbalanced the fall of Adam, bringing forth redemption and repairing the damage done by Adam.

The theme is reiterated by Paul, in Romans 5:18-21, when he states:

Therefore just as one man's trespass led to condemnation for all, so one man's act of righteousness leads to justification and life for all. For just as by the one man's disobedience the many were made sinners, so by the one man's obedience the many will be made righteous. But law came in, with the result that the trespass multiplied; but where sin increased, grace abounded all the more, so that, just as sin exercised dominion in death, so grace might also exercise dominion through justification* leading to eternal life through Jesus Christ our Lord.

In the 2nd century Church Father Irenaeus continued this tradition and stated: "so that what we had lost in Adam - namely to be according to the image and likeness of God- that we might recover in Christ Jesus." Irenaeus also used the analogy of "second Adam and second Eve" and suggested the Virgin Mary as the "second Eve" who had set a path of obedience for the second Adam (i.e. Jesus) from the Annunciation to Calvary.

The tradition continued in the 4th century by Ephrem the Syrian and later by Saint Augustine in his Felix culpa, i.e. the happy fall from grace of Adam and Eve. Later, in the 16th century, John Calvin viewed the birth of Jesus as the second Adam one of the six modes of atonement.

=== Light of the World ===
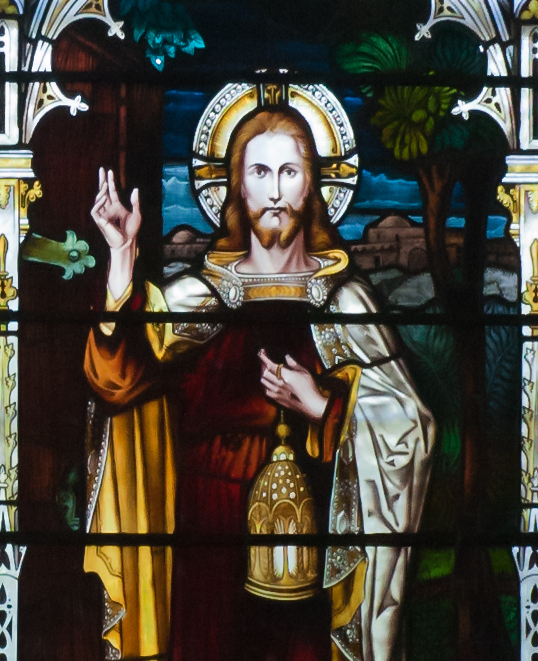
Stained glass of Jesus as "Light of the World", Church of St. Brendan, Bantry, Ireland

Jesus is called a light in seven instances in the New Testament and Light of the World only in the Gospel of John. The terms "Bread of Life" and "Life of the World" are also applied by Jesus to himself in John's Gospel in the same Christological sense.

In John 8:12 Jesus applies the title to himself while debating with the Jews, and states:

I am the light of the world: he who follows me shall not walk in darkness, but shall have the light of life.

Jesus again claims to be Light of the World in John 9:5, during the miracle of healing the blind at birth, saying:

When I am in the world, I am the Light of the World.

This episode leads into John 9:39 where Jesus metaphorically explains that he came to this world, so that the blind may see.

In the Christological context, the use of the title "Light of the World" is similar to the use of the title "Bread of Life" in John 6:35, where Jesus states: "I am the bread of life: he who comes to me shall not hunger. These assertions build on the Christological theme of John 5:26 where Jesus claims to possess life Just as the Father does and provide it to those who follow him. The term "Life of the World" is applied in the same sense by Jesus to himself in John 6:51.

This application of "light compared with darkness" also appears in 1 John 1:5 which applies it to God and states: "God is light, and in him is no darkness at all."

Jesus also used the term Light of the World to refer to his disciples, in Matthew 5:14: The term "Light of the World" is related to the parables of Salt and Light and Lamp under a bushel.

=== King of the Jews ===
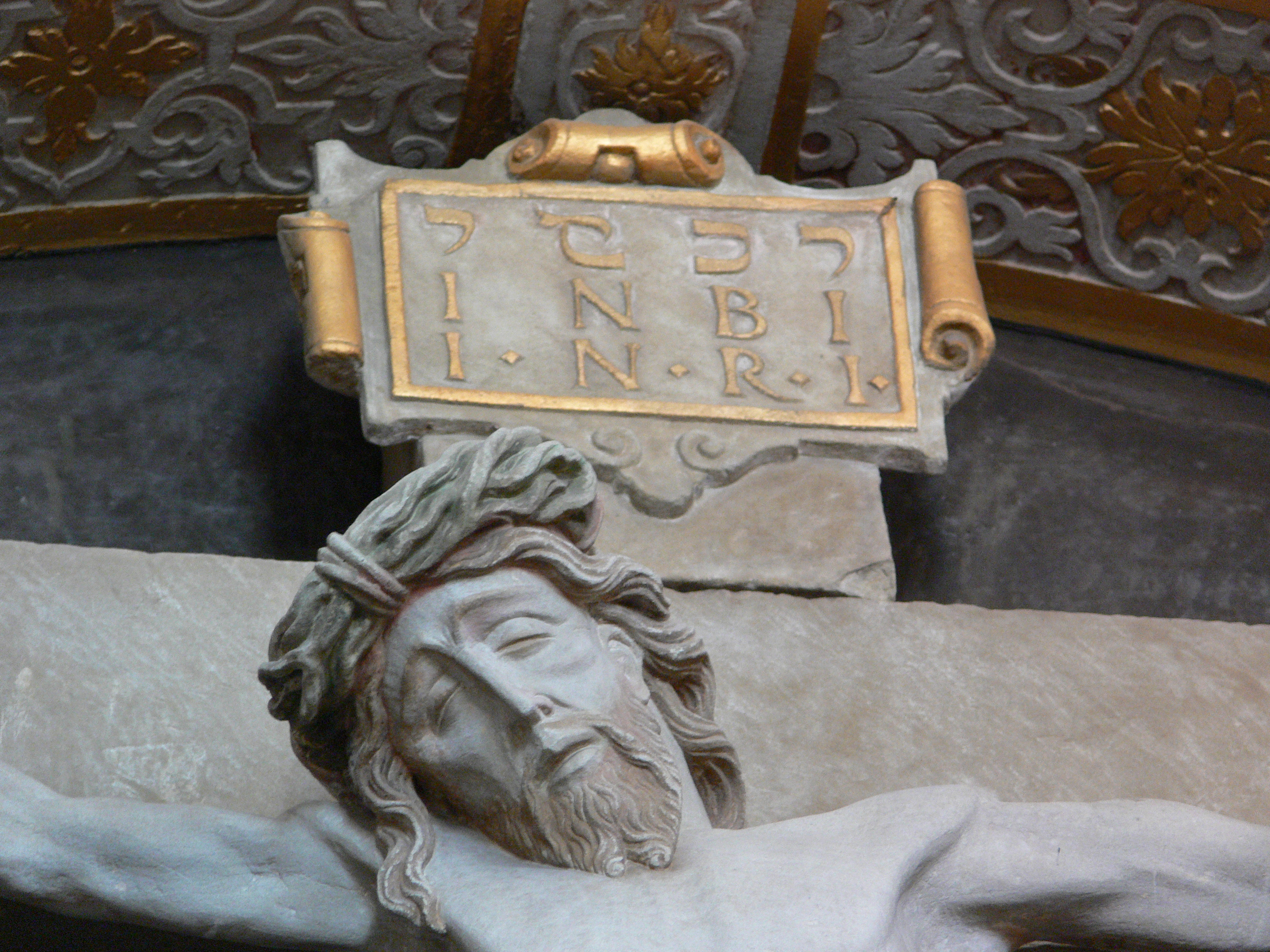
The acronym INRI (Jesus of Nazareth, King of the Jews) written in three languages, as in John 19:20, Ellwangen Abbey, Germany

In the New Testament, Jesus is referred to as the King of the Jews on three occasions, coming at the beginning of his life and at the end. Both uses of the title lead to dramatic results in the New Testament accounts. In the account of the Nativity of Jesus in the Gospel of Matthew, wise men (called the Magi) who come from the east call Jesus the "King of the Jews", causing King Herod to order the Massacre of the Innocents. In the accounts of the Passion of Jesus in all four Canonical Gospels, the use of the "King of the Jews" title leads to charges against Jesus that result in his Crucifixion.

The title "King of the Jews" is used only by the gentiles, namely by the Magi, Pontius Pilate and the Roman soldiers. In contrast the Jewish leaders in the Passion accounts prefer the designation "King of Israel", as in Matthew 27:42, Mark 15:32. The use of the term "King" in the charges brought against Jesus is central in the decision to crucify him. In John 19:12 Pilate seeks to release Jesus, but the Jews object, saying: "If thou release this man, thou art not Caesar's friend: every one that maketh himself a king speaketh against Caesar" bringing the power of Caesar to the forefront of the discussion for the assumption of the title King implies rebellion against the Roman Empire.

The final use of the title only appears in Luke 23:36-37. Here, after Jesus has carried the cross to Calvary and has been nailed to the cross, the soldiers look up on him on the cross, mock him, offer him vinegar and say: "If thou art the King of the Jews, save thyself." In the parallel account in Matthew 27:42 the Jewish priests mock Jesus as "King of Israel", saying: "He is the King of Israel; let him now come down from the cross, and we will believe on him."

=== Rabboni and Rabbi ===
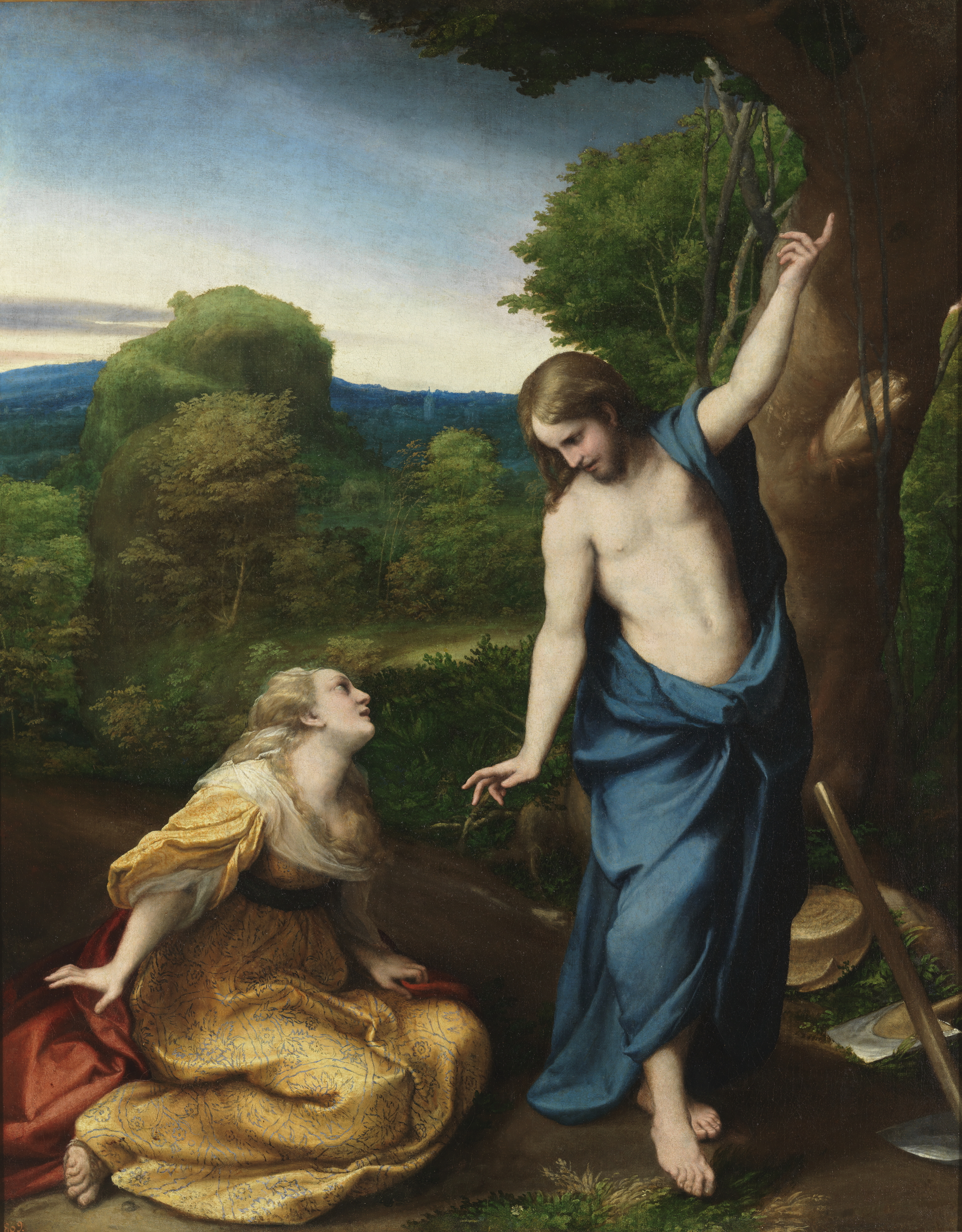
Mary Magdalene calling Jesus Rabboni and receiving the response: Noli me Tangere, depicted by Antonio da Correggio, c. 1534.

In John 20:16, when Mary Magdalene encounters Jesus shortly after the Resurrection, she calls him Rabbouni (ῥαββουνί) literally my great [one] or (more extensively) my Teacher. For those who do not speak Aramaic the Gospel of John translates this as "teacher", a Rabbi being a Jewish teacher, or master. In the New Testament, the term Rhabbouni is only used by the Magdalene here in John 20:16 and in Mark 10:51 by the blind man Bartimaeus in the account of the miracle of healing the blind near Jericho.

The Rabbi title is used in several New Testament episodes to refer to Jesus, but more often in the Gospel of John than elsewhere and does not appear in the Gospel of Luke at all. In Matthew's account of the Last Supper (Matthew 26:22-25) when Jesus says that he will be betrayed by one of his Apostles, one after another the Apostles say "Surely it is not I, Lord" but Judas Iscariot says "Surely it is not I, Rabbi", using the term Rabbi instead of Lord. The Iscariot again calls Jesus Rabbi in Matthew 26:49 when he betrays him in the Kiss of Judas episode, heavily implying he may never have acknowledged, believed, or understood the divinity of Jesus.

In Matthew 23:8–10, Jesus affirms the term Rabbi and Father are not to be used for any man, but only for God and for Christ. Jesus is called Rabbi in conversation by the Apostle Peter in Mark 9:5 and Mark 11:21, by Judas Iscariot in Mark 14:45, and by Nathanael in John 1:49, where he is also called the Son of God in the same sentence. On several occasions, the disciples also refer to Jesus as Rabbi in the Gospel of John, e.g. 4:31, 6:25, 9:2 and 11:8.

Intimating that the title Rabbi was used by status-seeking Pharisees (who "sit on the seat of Moses") and use the title as a sign of authority, in Matthew 23:1-8 Jesus rejected the title of Rabbi for his disciples, saying: "But be not ye called Rabbi: for one is your teacher, and all ye are brethren". The role of teacher is also referred to the Paraclete, mentioned by Jesus for the first time on the night before the Crucifixion.

Talmudic Scholar [Sherira Gaon] (c. 906 CE to c. 1006 CE) wrote that the title Rabbi did not exist until at least 50 CE. Thus, the New Testament references to rabbi are anachronisms.

=== Other names and titles ===
The New Testament uses several titles to refer to Jesus. However, some terms that are commonly used in the Christian tradition rarely appear in the New Testament, e.g. the exact term "Savior" appears only once, and is uttered by the Samaritans in John 4:42. The title "Nazarene" applied to Jesus has been also used to designate Christians in Syriac and Arabic traditions.

The title "Chosen one" or "Elect one" is used twice in Luke's gospel: eklektos is used in 23:35 when the rulers mock Jesus, while eklelegmenos is used in 9:35 when Jesus is transfigured. James R. Edwards notes that the phrase is used repeatedly in 1 Enoch, but was associated in Jewish thinking with triumph and glory, rather than with suffering.

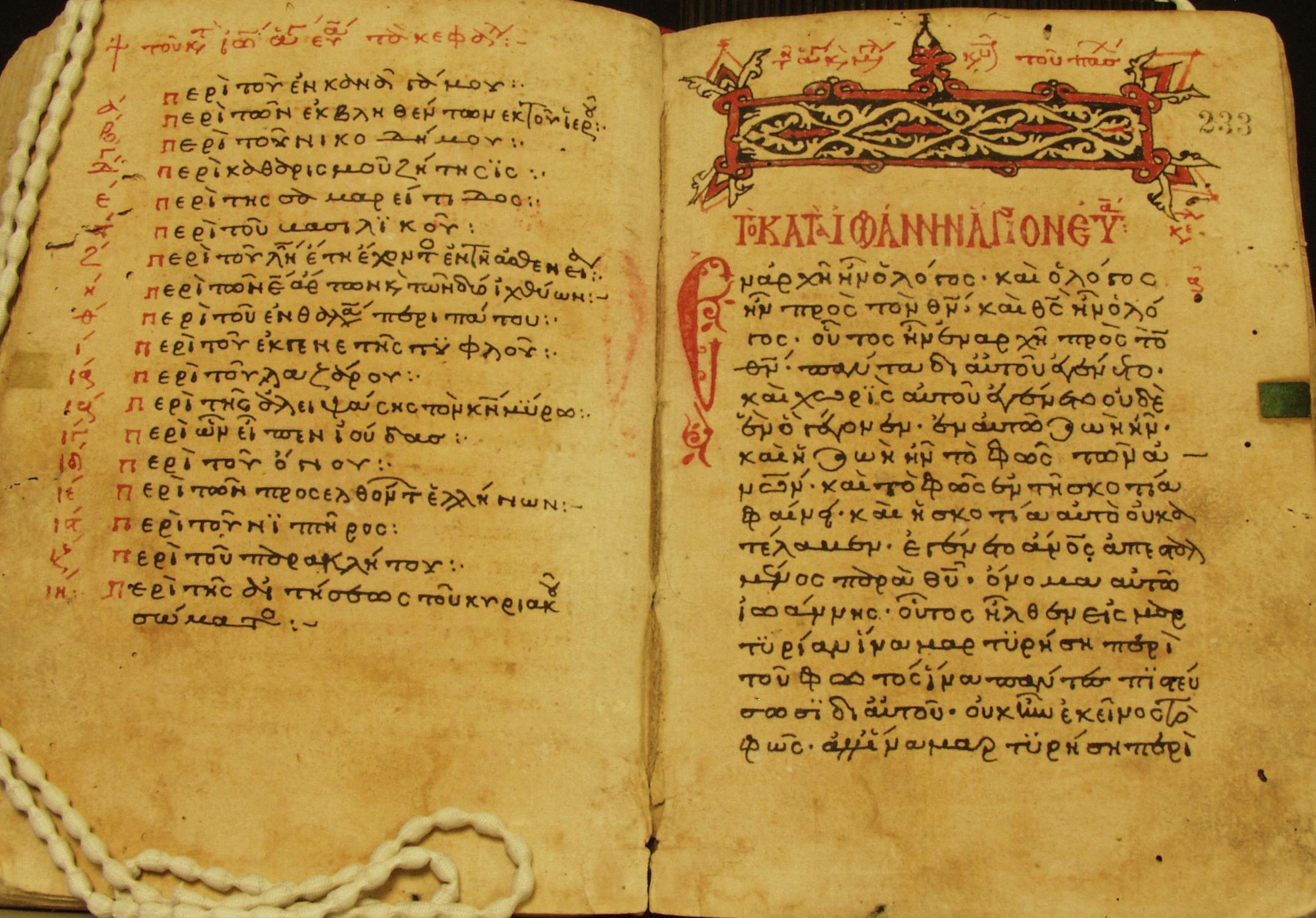
A 13th century Gospel of John, the only Gospel in which Bread of Life appears as one of the seven "I am" assertions

Christian theologians such as Thomas Aquinas have produced significant arguments analyzing various names and titles for Jesus. In John 8:58 Jesus says: "Before Abraham was born, I am." The phrase "I am" (εγω ειμι in Greek) was considered a name for Jesus by Aquinas who considered it the most proper of all divine names, for Aquinas believed it to refer to the "being of all things".

One of the titles preceded by an "I am" assertion of Jesus is the "Bread of Life" title in John 6:35: "I am the bread of life: he who comes to me shall not hunger." The Bread of Life Discourse takes place in the Gospel of John shortly after Jesus feeds the crowds with five loaves of bread and two fish.

In the Epistle to the Hebrews, Jesus is called an "Apostle" and a "High Priest" in 3:1, the preparation for the two titles being the preceding text of Hebrews 2:5-18 which present the two functions of Jesus: as an Apostle he represents God to humanity and as a High Priest he represents humanity to God.

While John's Gospel emphasizes Jesus as the Son of God, the Gospel of Luke depicts him as a prophet above all else, attributing that title to Jesus more often than even Mark. A prophet is not someone who merely preaches, but claims divine revelation through God. In Luke 4:24, following his hometown rejection, Jesus remarks that as a prophet he is not welcome in his own hometown. Elsewhere, in Luke 7:39 the Jews again doubt that Jesus is a prophet. The view of Jesus as a prophet is used in the concept of threefold office which sees his three roles as "Prophet, Priest and King". While during early Christianity there were people claiming to be prophets, there are no records of anyone else claiming to be a prophet during the life of Jesus.

In John 14:16 Jesus said he will ask the Father to send "another" paraclete, i.e. comforter. The term paraclete only appears in Johannine literature and apart from the four uses in the Gospel of John it appears only in 1 John 2:1. Given that 1 John 2:1 views Jesus as a paraclete, the reference in John 14:16 states that Jesus sends a second paraclete to continue the life of the Church after his departure. The statement regarding the paraclete is made within the "farewell discourse" during the Last Supper of Jesus and the Apostles. The paraclete is thus a link between the ministry of Jesus and the future life of the Church.

Some titles of Jesus are unique to the Book of Revelation. He is referred to as "Faithful and True" in Revelation 19:11, the "Alpha and Omega" in Revelation 22:13 and elsewhere, and the "Morning Star" in Revelation 22:16.

== See also ==
- Jesus in Christianity
- Jesus as Wisdom
- Life of Jesus in the New Testament
- List of Christian synonyms
- Names of God in Christianity
- New Testament places associated with Jesus
- Redeemer (Christianity)
- Threefold office
- Isaiah 9 (Prince of Peace)
