= Christians =

Adherents of Christianity

- The Christian cross, a common symbol of the Christian people

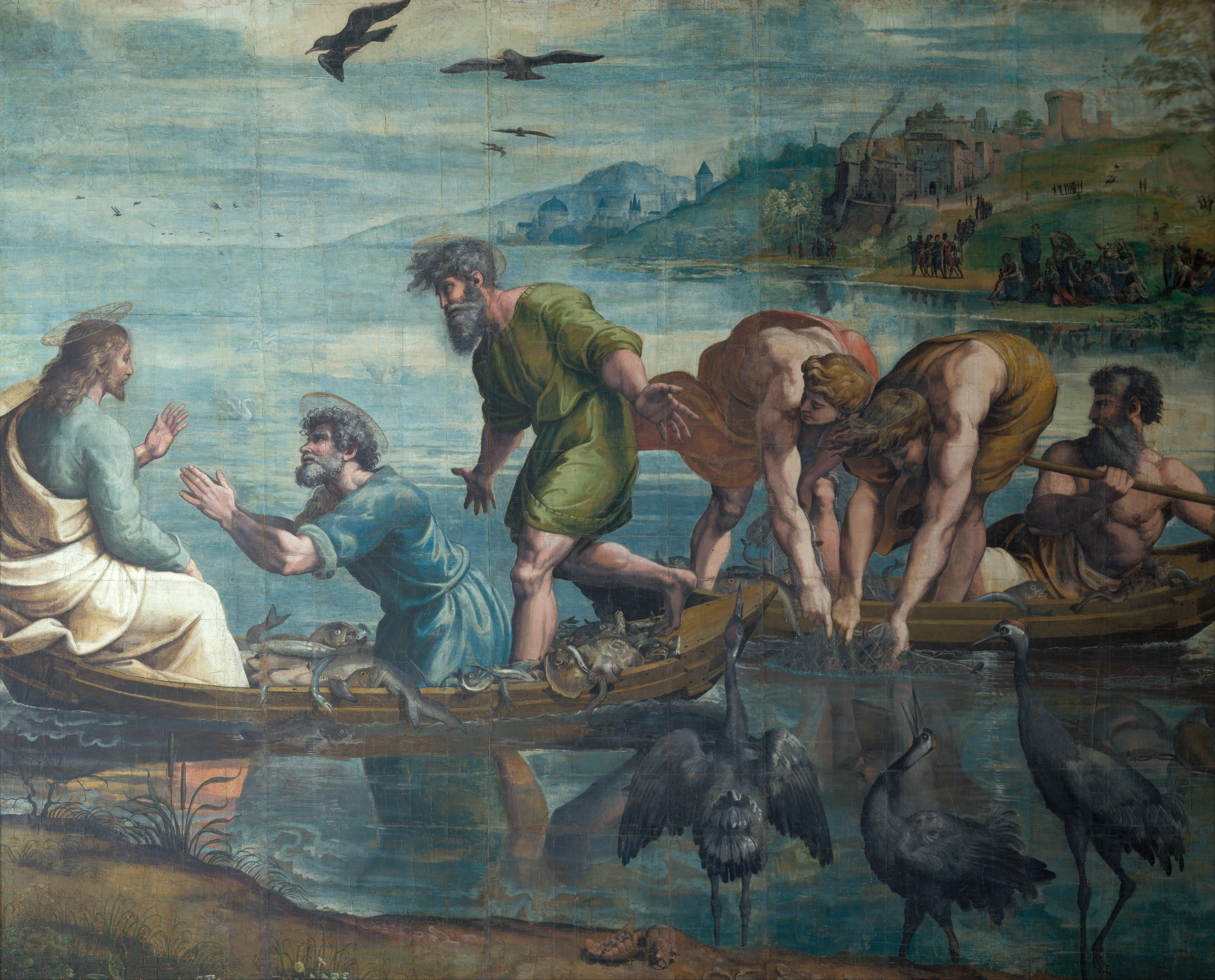
- After the miraculous catch of fish, Jesus invokes his disciples to become "fishers of men" (Matthew 4:19) by Raphael, (c. 1515)

Total population
- c. 2.3 billion (28.8% of the global population)▲ (Worldwide, 2020 est.)

Founder
- Jesus, according to sacred tradition

Regions with significant populations
- United States: 217,270,000
- Brazil: 168,300,000
- Mexico: 113,070,000
- Philippines: 102,510,000
- Russia: 102,350,000
- Nigeria: 92,770,000
- DR Congo: 92,400,000
- Ethiopia: 73,230,000
- South Africa: 51,630,000
- Italy: 48,210,000

Religions
- Christianity: 50% Catholic Church (Latin Church, Eastern Catholic Churches); 37% Protestantism (Adventism, Anglicanism, Baptist churches, Reformed churches, Lutheranism, Methodism, Pentecostalism and other denominations); 10% Eastern Orthodox Church; 2% Oriental Orthodox Churches; 1% Other Christian traditions (incl. Assyrian Church of the East, Latter Day Saint movement, Jehovah's Witnesses, Unitarianism and Nondenominational churches)

Scriptures
- Bible (Old and New Testament)

Languages
- Predominant spoken languages: Spanish; English; Indonesian; Portuguese; Russian; Mandarin Chinese; French; German; Igbo; Polish; Ukrainian; Filipino; Italian; Malayalam; Arabic; Amharic; other vernacular languages; Sacred languages: Ecclesiastical Latin; Koine Greek; Syriac; Hebrew; Aramaic; Geʽez; Coptic; Old Church Slavonic and Church Slavonic; Old Georgian; Classical Armenian

A Christian (/ˈkrɪstʃən, -tiən/) is a person who follows or adheres to Christianity, a monotheistic Abrahamic religion based on the life and teachings of Jesus Christ. Christians form the largest religious community in the world. The words Christ and Christian derive from the Koine Greek title Christós (Χριστός), a translation of the Biblical Hebrew term mashiach (מָשִׁיחַ) (usually rendered as messiah in English). While there are diverse interpretations of Christianity which sometimes conflict, they are united in believing that Jesus has a unique significance. The term Christian used as an adjective is descriptive of anything associated with Christianity or Christian churches, or in a proverbial sense "all that is noble, and good, and Christ-like."

According to a 2011 Pew Research Center survey, there were 2.3 billion Christians around the world, up from about 600 million in 1910. Today, about 37% of all Christians live in the Americas, about 26% live in Europe, 24% live in sub-Saharan Africa, about 13% live in Asia and the Pacific, and 1% live in the Middle East and North Africa. Christians make up the majority of the population in 158 countries and territories. 280 million Christians live as a minority. About half of all Christians worldwide are Catholic, while more than a third are Protestant (37%). Eastern Christians, including the Eastern Orthodox, Oriental Orthodox, and Church of the East, comprise 12% of the world's Christians. Other Christian groups make up the remainder. By 2050, the Christian population is expected to exceed 3 billion due to overall total fertility rate according to Pew Research Center. According to a 2012 Pew Research Center survey, Christianity will remain the world's largest religion in 2050, if current trends continue. In recent history, Christians have experienced persecution of varying severity, especially in the Middle East, North Africa, East Asia, and South Asia.

== Etymology ==
The Greek word Χριστιανός (Christianos), meaning 'follower of Christ', comes from Χριστός (Christos), meaning 'anointed one', with an adjectival ending borrowed from Latin to denote adhering to, or even belonging to, as in slave ownership. In the Greek Septuagint, christos was used to translate the Hebrew מָשִׁיחַ (Mašíaḥ, 'messiah'), meaning "[one who is] anointed". In other European languages, equivalent words to Christian are likewise derived from the Greek, such as chrétien in French and cristiano in Spanish.

The abbreviations Xian and Xtian (and similarly formed other parts of speech) have been used since at least the 17th century: Oxford English Dictionary shows a 1634 use of Xtianity and Xian is seen in a 1634–38 diary. The word Xmas uses a similar contraction.

== Early usage ==
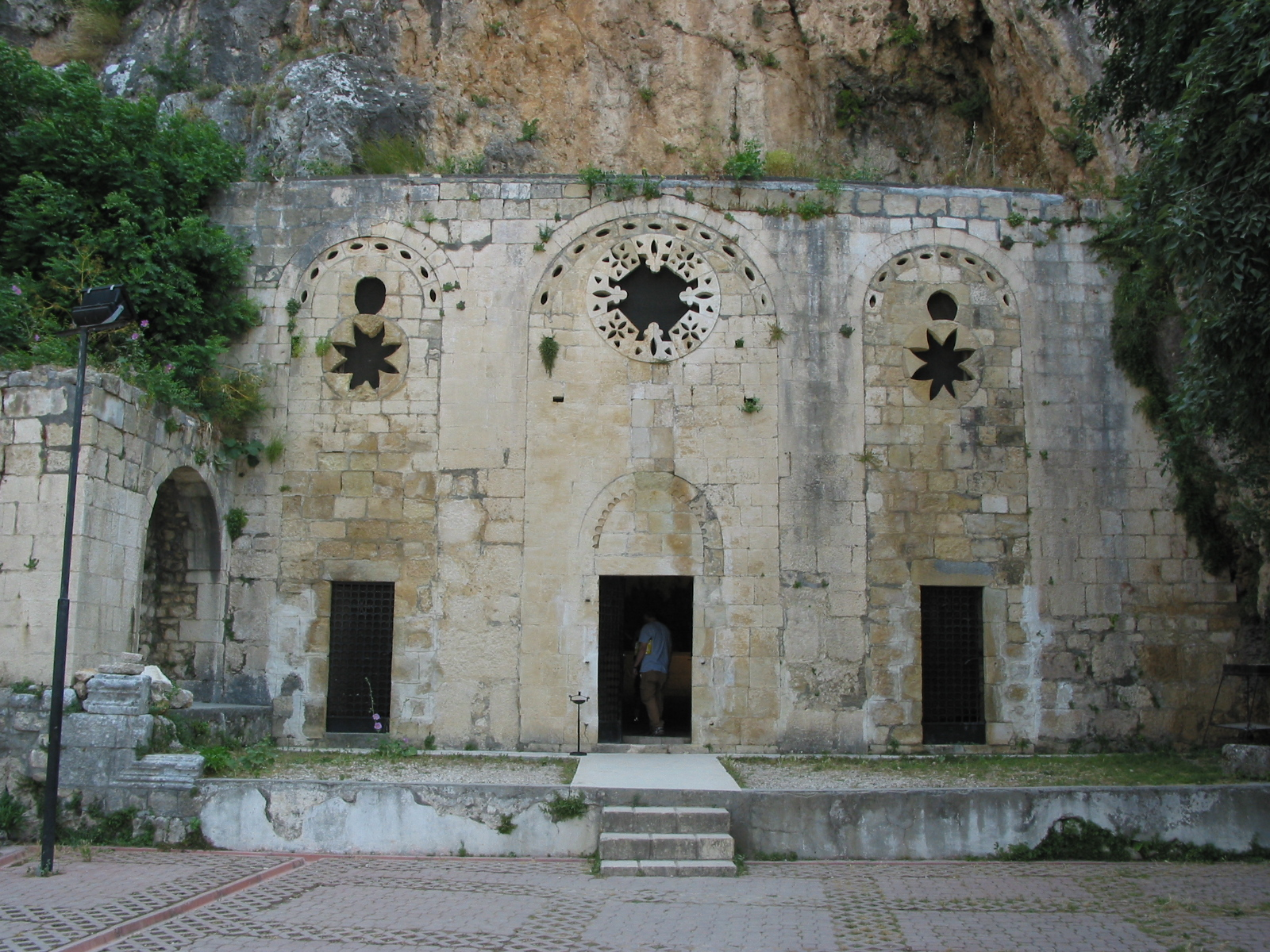
The Church of Saint Peter near Antioch (modern-day Antakya), the city where the disciples were called "Christians"

The first recorded use of the term (or its cognates in other languages) is in the New Testament, in Acts 11 after Barnabas brought Saul (Paul) to Antioch where they taught the disciples for about a year. The text says that "the disciples were called Christians first in Antioch" (Acts 11:26). The second mention of the term follows in Acts 26, where Herod Agrippa II replied to Paul the Apostle, "Then Agrippa said unto Paul, Almost thou persuadest me to be a Christian." (Acts 26:28). The third and final New Testament reference to the term is in 1 Peter 4, which exhorts believers: "Yet if [any man suffer] as a Christian, let him not be ashamed; but let him glorify God on this behalf." (1 Peter 4:16).

Kenneth Samuel Wuest holds that all three original New Testament verses' usages reflect a derisive element in the term Christian to refer to followers of Christ who did not acknowledge the emperor of Rome. The city of Antioch, where someone gave them the name Christians, had a reputation for coming up with such nicknames. However Peter's apparent endorsement of the term led to its being preferred over "Nazarenes" and the term Christianoi from 1 Peter becomes the standard term in the Early Church Fathers from Ignatius and Polycarp onwards.

The earliest occurrences of the term in non-Christian literature include Josephus, referring to "the tribe of Christians, so named from him;" Pliny the Younger in correspondence with Trajan; and Tacitus, writing at the beginning of the 2nd century. In the Annals he relates that "by vulgar appellation [they were] commonly called Christians" and identifies Christians as Nero's scapegoats for the Great Fire of Rome.

=== Nazarenes ===
Another term for Christians which appears in the New Testament is Nazarenes. Jesus is named as a Nazarene in Matthew 2:23, while Paul is said to be Nazarene in Acts 24:5. The latter verse makes it clear that Nazarene also referred to the name of a sect or heresy, as well as the town called Nazareth.

The term Nazarene was also used by Tertullus (Against Marcion 4:8), the lawyer representing the Jews, who records the phrase "the Jews call us Nazarenes". In c. 331 AD, Eusebius records that Christ was called a Nazoraean from the name Nazareth, and that in earlier centuries "Christians" were once called "Nazarenes". The Hebrew equivalent of Nazarenes, Notzrim, occurs in the Babylonian Talmud in reference to an earlier, non-Christian group, versus the current modern-Hebrew usage for Christians.

== Modern usage ==
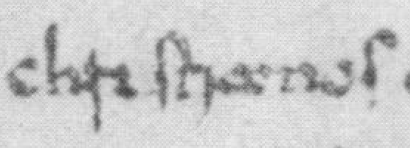
chrestianos, first mention of Christians in Tacitus' Annals. 11th century copy.

The Latin cross and Ichthys symbols, two symbols often used by Christians to represent their religion

=== Definition ===
A wide range of beliefs and practices are found across the world among those who call themselves Christian. Denominations and sects disagree on a common definition of "Christianity". For example, Timothy Beal notes the disparity of beliefs among those who identify as Christians in the United States as follows:

Although all of them have their historical roots in Christian theology and tradition, and although most would identify themselves as Christian, many would not identify others within the larger category as Christian. Most Baptists and fundamentalists (Christian Fundamentalism), for example, would not acknowledge Mormonism or Christian Science as Christian. In fact, the nearly 77 percent of Americans who self-identify as Christian are a diverse pluribus of Christianities that are far from any collective unity.

Linda Woodhead attempts to provide a common belief thread for Christians by noting that "Whatever else they might disagree about, Christians are at least united in believing that Jesus has a unique significance." Michael Martin evaluated three historical Christian creeds (the Apostles' Creed, the Nicene Creed and the Athanasian Creed) to establish a set of basic Christian assumptions which include belief in theism, the historicity of Jesus, the Incarnation, salvation through faith in Jesus, and Jesus as an ethical role model.

=== Hebrew and Jewish terms ===
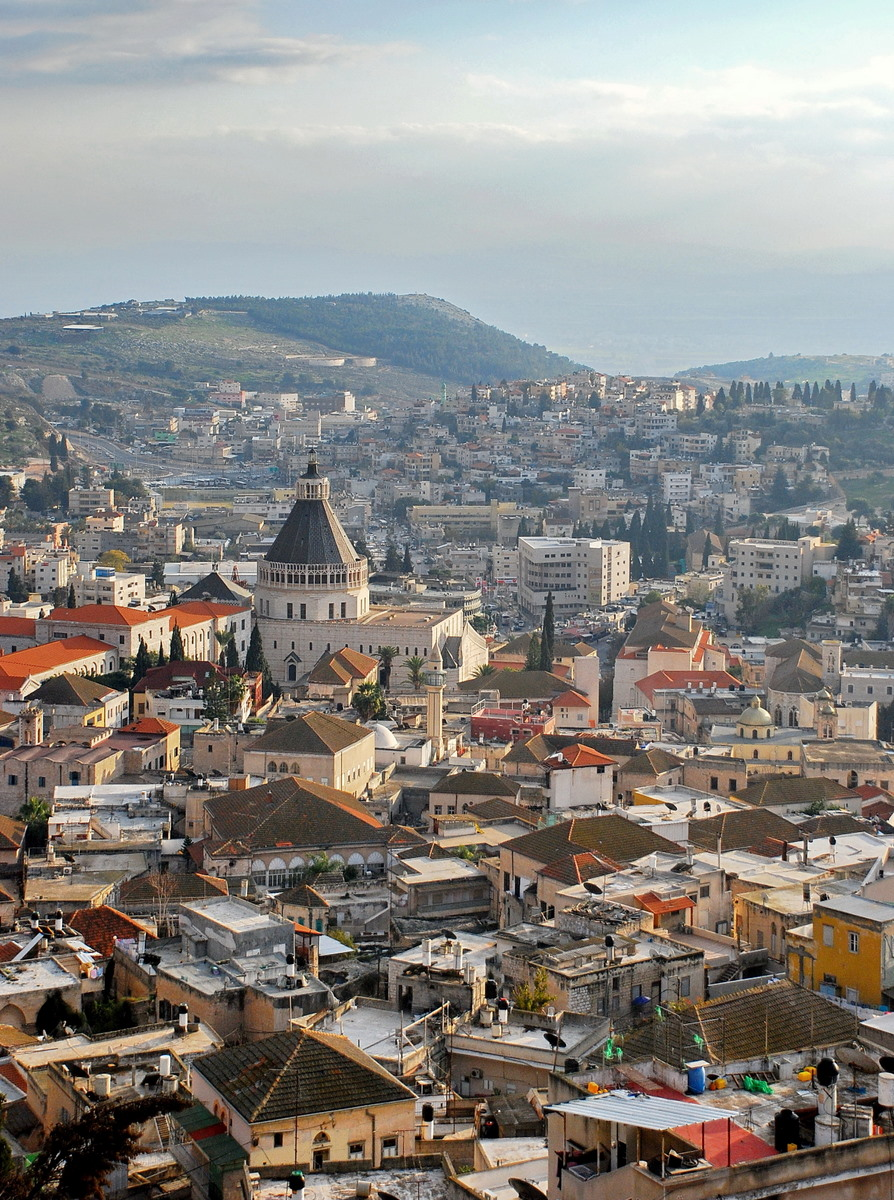
Nazareth is described as the childhood home of Jesus. Various languages employ the word Nazarene as a general designation for members of the Christian religion.

The Hebrew word meaning Christian is Notzri (נוֹצְרִי) 'Nazarene', derived from the mention in Christian scripture that Jesus came from the Jewish village of Nazareth (נָצְרַת) 'Natzeret/Natzrat' in the Galilee, today in northern Israel. As Jesus is not a part of Judaism, modern Hebrew-speaking Israelis and English-speaking Jews refer to Christianity’s Messianic Judaism sect as Yehudim Meshihi'im (יְהוּדִים מְשִׁיחִיִּים) 'Messianic Jews', and generally, as Christians.

=== Arabic terms ===
In Arabic-speaking cultures, two words are commonly used for Christians: Naṣrānī (نصراني), plural Naṣārā (نصارى) is generally understood to be derived from Nazarenes, believers of Jesus of Nazareth through Syriac (Aramaic); Masīḥī (مسيحي) means followers of the Messiah. Where there is a distinction, Naṣrānī refers to people from a Christian culture and Masīḥī is used by Christians themselves for those with a religious faith in Jesus. In some countries Naṣrānī tends to be used generically for non-Muslim Western foreigners.

Another Arabic word sometimes used for Christians, particularly in a political context, is Ṣalībī (صليبي 'Crusader') from ṣalīb (صليب 'cross'), which refers to Crusaders and may have negative connotations. However, Ṣalībī is a modern term; historically, Muslim writers described European Christian Crusaders as al-Faranj or Alfranj (الفرنج) and Firinjīyah (الفرنجيّة) in Arabic. This word comes from the name of the Franks and can be seen in the Arab history text Al-Kamil fi al-Tarikh by Ali ibn al-Athir.

In the Maltese language, a Semitic European language related to Arabic written in the Latin alphabet, Christians are referred to as Nsara, singular masculine Nisrani. The Romance-borrowed Kristjan may also be used.

=== Asian terms ===
The most common Persian word is Masīhī (مسیحی), from Arabic. Other words are Nasrānī (نصرانی), from Syriac for 'Nazarene', and Tarsā (ترسا), from the Middle Persian word Tarsāg, also meaning 'Christian', derived from tars, meaning 'fear, respect'.

An old Kurdish word for Christian frequently in usage was felle (فەڵە), coming from the root word meaning 'to be saved, attain salvation'.

The Syriac term Nasrani ('Nazarene') has also been attached to the Saint Thomas Christians of Kerala, India. In northern India and Pakistan, Christians are referred to ʿĪsāʾī (Hindi: ईसाई, Urdu: عیسائی). Masīhī (Hindi: मसीही, Urdu: مسیحی) is a term Christians use to refer to themselves as well.

In the past, the Malays used to call Christians in Malay by the Portuguese loanword Serani (from Arabic Naṣrānī), but the term now refers to the modern Kristang creoles of Malaysia. In the Indonesian language, the term Nasrani is also used alongside Kristen.

The Chinese word is 基督徒 (jīdū tú), literally 'Christ follower'. The name Christ was originally phonetically written in Chinese as 基利斯督, which was later abbreviated as 基督. The term is Kî-tuk in the southern Hakka dialect; the two characters are pronounced Jīdū in Mandarin Chinese. In Vietnam, the same two characters read Cơ đốc, and a "follower of Christianity" is a tín đồ Cơ đốc giáo.

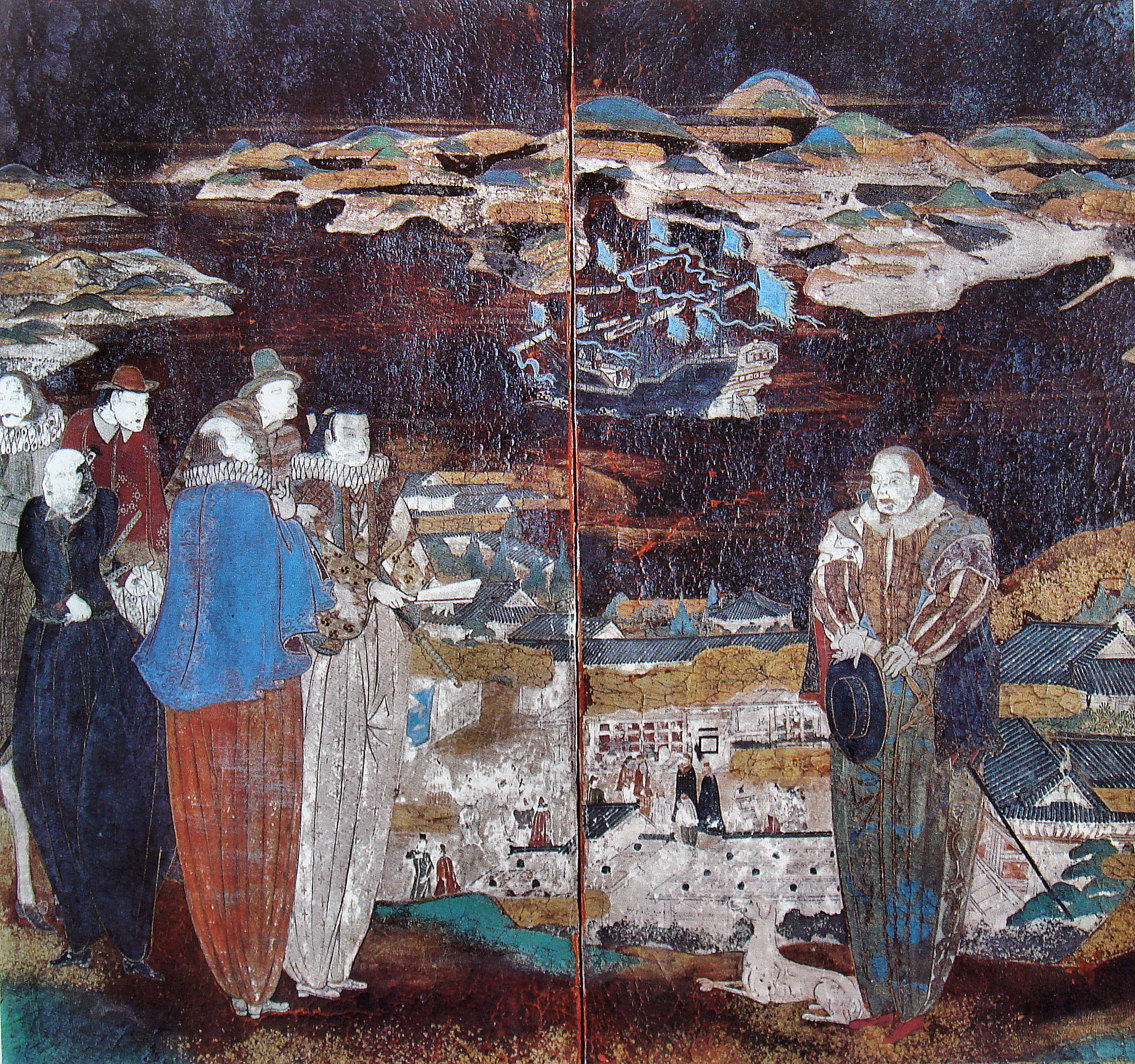
Japanese Christians (Kurisuchan) in Portuguese costume, 16–17th century

In Japan, the term kirishitan (written in Edo period documents 吉利支丹, 切支丹, and in modern Japanese histories as キリシタン), from Portuguese cristão, referred to Roman Catholics in the 16th and 17th centuries before the religion was banned by the Tokugawa shogunate. Today, Christians are referred to in Standard Japanese as キリスト教徒 (Kirisuto-kyōto) or the English-derived term クリスチャン (kurisuchan).

Korean still uses 기독교도 (RR: Gidokkyodo) for 'Christian', though the Portuguese loanword 그리스도 (RR: Geuriseudo) now replaced the old Sino-Korean 기독 (RR: Gidok), which refers to Christ himself.

In Thailand, the most common terms are คนคริสต์ (RTGS: khon khrit) or ชาวคริสต์ (RTGS: chao khrit) which literally means 'Christ person/people' or 'Jesus person/people'. The Thai word คริสต์ (RTGS: khrit) is derived from Christ.

In the Philippines, the most common terms are Kristiyano (for 'Christian') and Kristiyanismo (for 'Christianity') in most Philippine languages; both derive from Spanish cristiano and cristianismo (also used in Chavacano) due to the country's rich history of early Christianity during the Spanish colonial era. Some Protestants in the Philippines use the term Kristiyano (before the term born again became popular) to differentiate themselves from Catholics (Katoliko).

=== Eastern European terms ===
The region of modern Eastern Europe and Central Eurasia has a long history of Christianity and Christian communities on its lands. In ancient times, in the first centuries after the birth of Christ, when this region was called Scythia, the geographical area of Scythians – Christians already lived there. Later the region saw the first states to adopt Christianity officially – initially Armenia (301 AD) and Georgia (337 AD), later Bulgaria (c. 864) and Kyivan Rus (c. 988 AD).

In some areas, people came to denote themselves as Christians (Russian: христиане, крестьяне; Ukrainian: християни, romanized: khrystyiany) and as Russians (Russian: русские), Ruthenians (Old East Slavic: русини, руснаки, romanized: rusyny, rusnaky), or Ukrainians (Ukrainian: українці, romanized: ukraintsi).

In time the Russian term крестьяне (khrest'yane) acquired the meaning 'peasants of Christian faith' and later 'peasants' (the main part of the population of the region), while the term Russian: христиане (khristiane) retained its religious meaning and the term Russian: русские (russkie) began to mean representatives of the heterogeneous Russian nation formed on the basis of common Christian faith and language, which strongly influenced the history and development of the region. In the region, the term Orthodox faith (Russian: православная вера, pravoslavnaia vera) or Russian faith (Russian: русская вера, russkaia vera) from the earliest times became almost as common as the original Christian faith (Russian: христианская, крестьянская вера khristianskaia, krestianskaia).

Also in some contexts the term cossack (Old East Slavic: козак, казак, romanized: kozak, kazak) was used to denote "free" Christians of steppe origin and East Slavic language.

=== Other non-religious usages ===
Nominally "Christian" societies made "Christian" a default label for citizenship or for "people like us". In this context, religious or ethnic minorities can use "Christians" or "you Christians" loosely as a shorthand term for mainstream members of society who do not belong to their group – even in a thoroughly secular (though formerly Christian) society.

== Demographics ==
As of 2020, Christianity had approximately 2.4 billion adherents. The faith represents about a third of the world's population and is the largest religion in the world. Christians have composed about 33 percent of the world's population for around 100 years. The largest Christian denomination is the Roman Catholic Church, with 1.3 billion adherents, representing half of all Christians.

Christianity remains the dominant religion in the Western World, where 70% are Christians. According to a 2012 Pew Research Center survey, if current trends continue, Christianity will remain the world's largest religion by 2050. By 2050, the Christian population is expected to exceed 3 billion. While Muslims have an average of 3.1 children per woman—the highest rate of all religious groups—Christians are second, with 2.7 children per woman. High birth rates and conversion were cited as the reason for Christian population growth. A 2015 study found that approximately 10.2 million Muslims converted to Christianity. Christianity is growing in Africa, Asia, Eastern Europe, Latin America, the Muslim world, and Oceania.

Percentage of Christians worldwide, June 2014

Christians (self-described) by region(Pew Research Center, 2011)
Region	Christians	% Christian
Europe	558,260,000	75.2
Latin America–Caribbean	531,280,000	90.0
Sub-Saharan Africa	517,340,000	62.9
Asia Pacific	286,950,000	7.1
North America	266,630,000	77.4
Middle East–North Africa	12,710,000	3.7
World	2,173,180,000	31.5

=== Socioeconomics ===
A Pew Center study about religion and education around the world in 2016, found that Christians ranked as the second most educated religious group around in the world after Jews with an average of 9.3 years of schooling, and the highest numbers of years of schooling among Christians were found in Germany (13.6), New Zealand (13.5) and Estonia (13.1). Christians were also found to have the second highest number of graduate and post-graduate degrees per capita while in absolute numbers ranked in the first place (220 million). Between the various Christian communities, Singapore outranks other nations in terms of Christians who obtain a university degree in institutions of higher education (67%), followed by the Christians of Israel (63%), and the Christians of Georgia (57%).

According to the study, Christians in North America, Europe, Middle East, North Africa and Asia Pacific regions are highly educated since many of the world's universities were built by the historic Christian denominations, in addition to the historical evidence that "Christian monks built libraries and, in the days before printing presses, preserved important earlier writings produced in Latin, Greek and Arabic". According to the same study, Christians have a significant amount of gender equality in educational attainment, and the study suggests that one of the reasons is the encouragement of the Protestant Reformers in promoting the education of women, which led to the eradication of illiteracy among females in Protestant communities.

== Culture ==
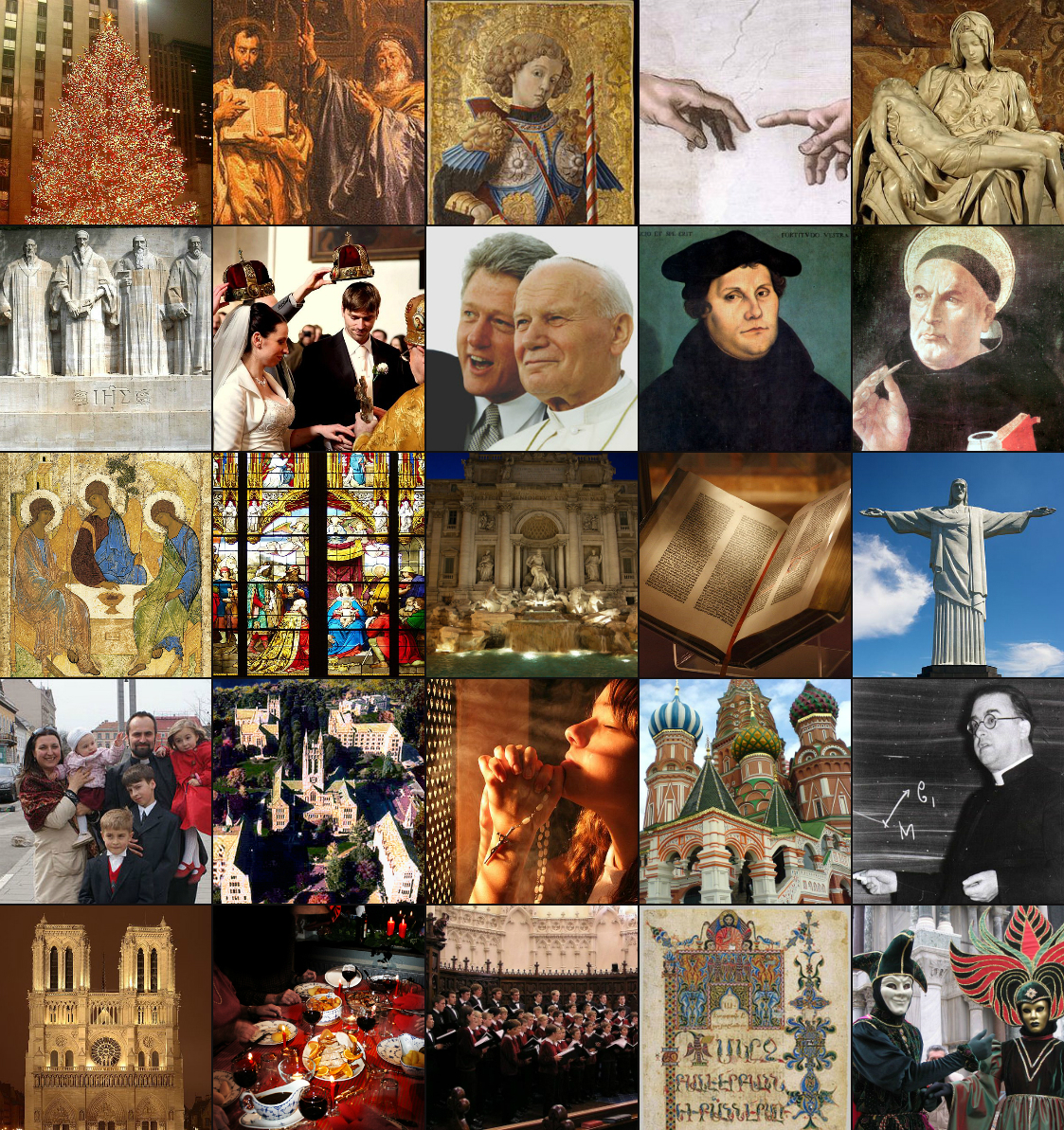
Set of pictures showcasing Christian culture and famous Christian leaders

Christian culture describes the cultural practices common to Christian peoples. There are variations in the application of Christian beliefs in different cultures and traditions. Christian culture has influenced and assimilated much from the Greco-Roman, Byzantine, Western culture, Middle Eastern, Slavic, Caucasian, and Indian cultures.

Since the spread of Christianity from the Levant to Europe and North Africa and Horn of Africa during the early Roman Empire, Christendom has been divided in the pre-existing Greek East and Latin West. Consequently, different versions of the Christian cultures arose with their own rites and practices, centered around the cities such as Rome (Western Christianity) and Carthage, whose communities was called Western or Latin Christendom, and Constantinople (Eastern Christianity), Antioch (Syriac Christianity), Kerala (Indian Christianity) and Alexandria, among others, whose communities were called Eastern or Oriental Christendom. The Byzantine Empire was one of the peaks in Christian history and Christian civilization. From the 11th to 13th centuries, Latin Christendom rose to the central role of the Western world and Western culture.

Western culture, throughout most of its history, has been nearly equivalent to Christian culture, and a large portion of the population of the Western Hemisphere can be described as practicing or nominal Christians. The notion of "Europe" and the "Western World" has been intimately connected with the concept of "Christianity and Christendom". Outside the Western world, Christians has had an influence and contributed on various cultures, such as in Africa, the Near East, Middle East, East Asia, Southeast Asia, and the Indian subcontinent.

Christians have made noted contributions to a range of fields, including philosophy, science and technology, medicine, fine arts and architecture, politics, literatures, music, and business. According to 100 Years of Nobel Prizes a review of the Nobel Prizes award between 1901 and 2000 reveals that (65.4%) of Nobel Prizes Laureates, have identified Christianity in its various forms as their religious preference.

== Persecution ==
In 2017, Open Doors, a human rights NGO, estimated approximately 260 million Christians are subjected annually to "high, very high, or extreme persecution", with North Korea considered the most hazardous nation for Christians.

In 2019, a report commissioned by the United Kingdom's Secretary of State of the Foreign and Commonwealth Office (FCO) to investigate global persecution of Christians found religious persecution has increased, and is highest in the Middle East, North Africa, India, China, North Korea, and Latin America, among others, and that it is global and not limited to Islamic states. This investigation found that approximately 80% of persecuted believers worldwide are Christians.

== See also ==
- Christendom
- Conversion to Christianity
- Cultural Christians
- Early Christianity
- List of Christian denominations
- List of Christian synonyms
- List of religions and spiritual traditions
- Lists of Christians

== Bibliography ==
Etymology

- Bickerman, Elias J. (April 1949). "The Name of Christians". The Harvard Theological Review. 42 (2): 109–124. doi:10.1017/s0017816000019635. ISSN 0017-8160. JSTOR 1507955. S2CID 164195885. (from which page numbers are cited) also available in Bickerman, Elias J. (1986). Studies in Jewish and Christian history. Vol. 2. BRILL. pp. 794–808. ISBN 90-04-04395-0.
- Wuest, Kenneth Samuel (1973). Wuest's word studies from the Greek New Testament. Vol. 1. Wm. B. Eerdmans. ISBN 978-0-8028-2280-2.
