= I am (biblical term) =

Christian term used in the Bible

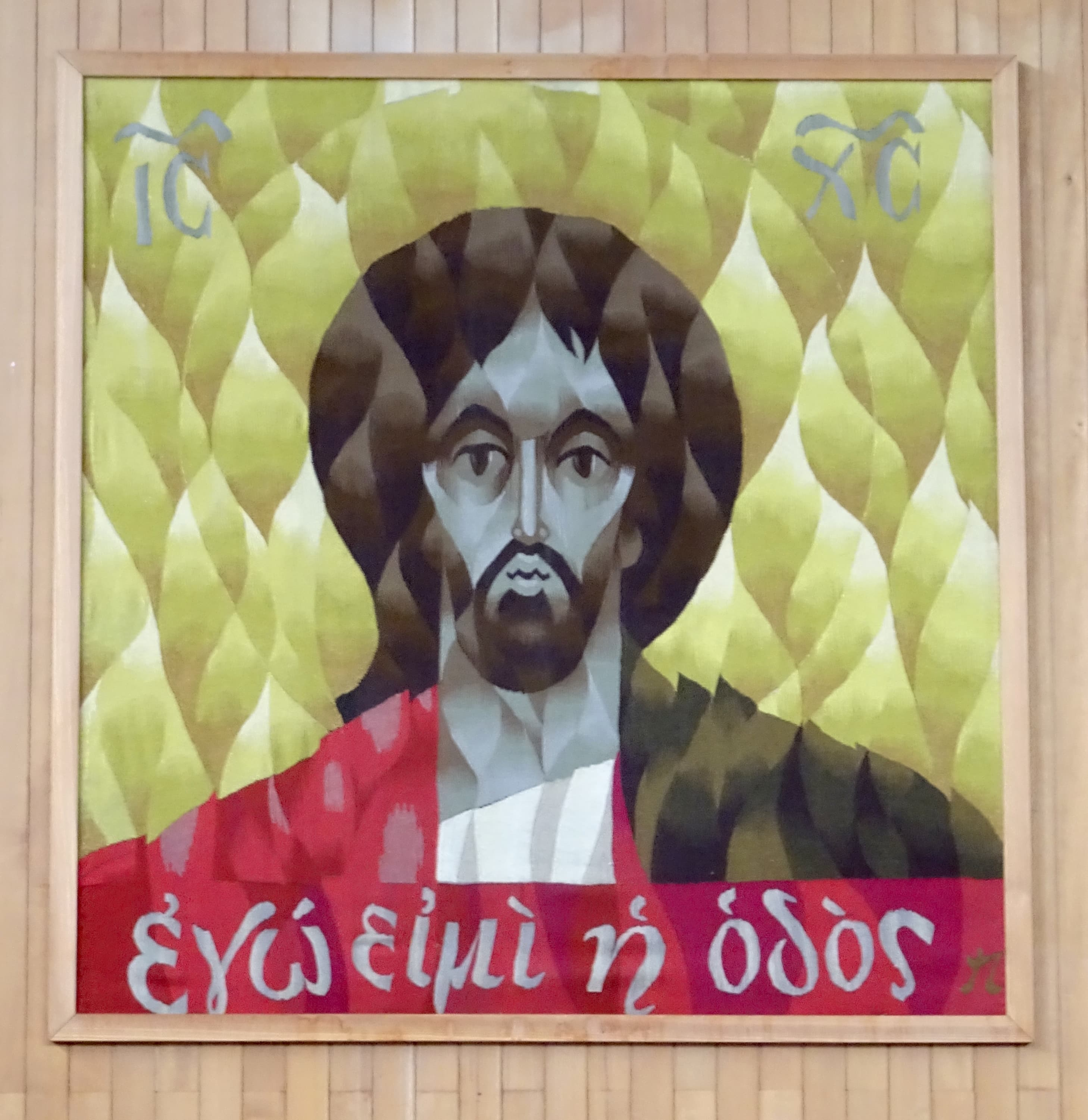
Pius X church, Vernier, Switzerland: Ego eimi hē hodos, "I am the way" in Greek

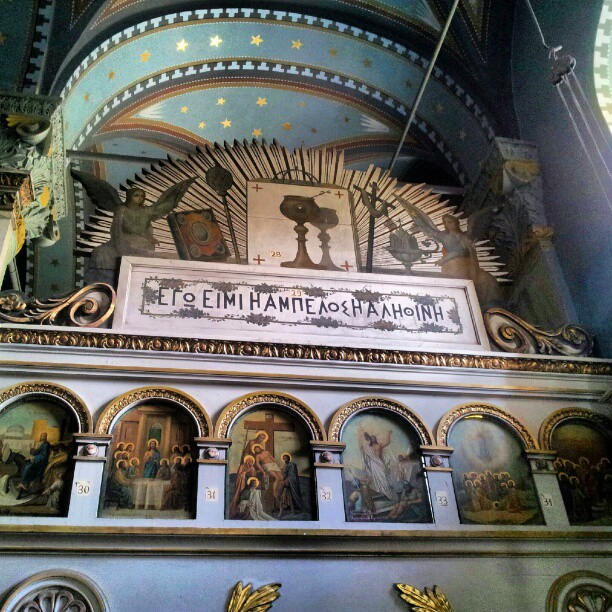
From an Istanbul church: Ego eimi hē ampelos hē alēthinē, "I am the true vine"

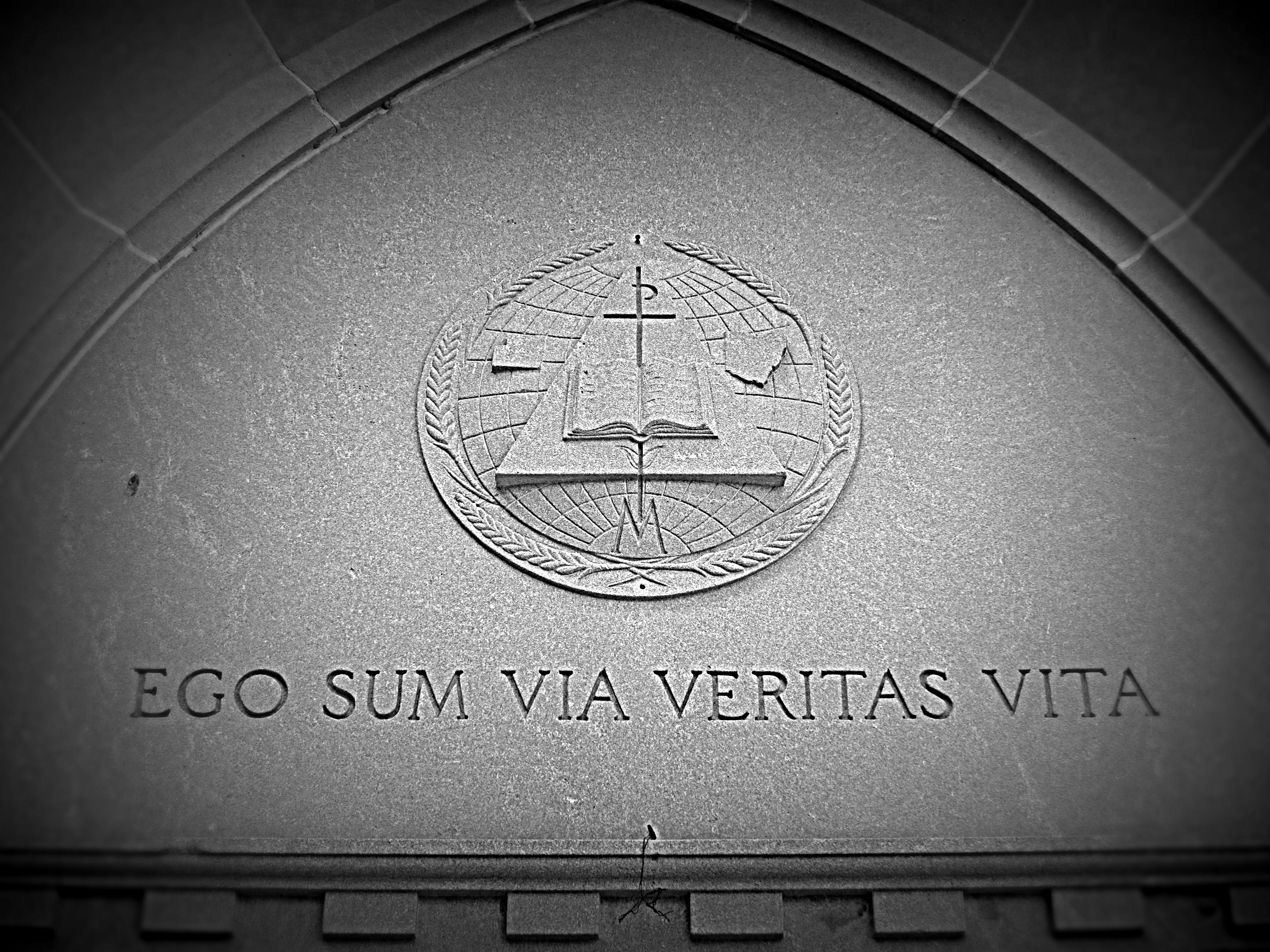
Latin translation at the Sacred Heart Catholic Church (McCartyville, Ohio): "I am the way, the truth [and] the life"

The Koine Greek term Ego eimi (Ἐγώ εἰμί, pronounced [eɣó imí]), lit. 'I am' or 'It is I', is an emphatic form of the copulative verb εἰμι that is recorded in the Gospels to have been spoken by Jesus on several occasions to refer to himself not with the role of a verb but playing the role of a name, in the Gospel of John occurring seven times with specific titles. It is connected to the passage in Exodus 3:14 in which God gives his name as אֶהְיֶה אֲשֶׁר אֶהְיֶה, Ehyeh Asher Ehyeh, translated most basically as "I am that I am" or "I shall be what I am". These usages have been the subject of significant Christological analysis.

== New Testament ==
In the New Testament, the personal pronoun ἐγώ in conjunction with the present first-person singular copulative εἰμι is recorded to have been used mainly by Jesus, especially in the Gospel of John.

It is used in the Gospel of John both with and without a predicate nominative. The seven occurrences with a predicate nominative that have resulted in some of the titles for Jesus are:

- I am the Bread of Life (John 6:35)
- I am the Light of the World (John 8:12)
- I am the Door (John 10:9)
- I am the Good Shepherd (John 10:11,14)
- I am the Resurrection and the Life (John 11:25)
- I am the Way and the Truth and the Life (John 14:6)
- I am the Vine (John 15:1,5)

=== With predicate nominative ===
There are other times the phrase is used in the New Testament, but with a predicate nominative and/or adjectives in between ἐγώ and εἰμι: a centurion in Matt 8:9 and Luke 7:8, Zechariah in Luke 1:18, Gabriel in Luke 1:19, a man blind from birth in John 9:9 who is healed by Jesus and told to go wash in the Pool of Siloam, Peter in Acts 10:21 and Acts 10:26, Paul the Apostle in Acts 22:3, Acts 23:6, Acts 26:29, Romans 7:14, Romans 11:1, Romans 11:13, 1 Corinthians 15:9 and 1 Timothy 1:15, some Corinthian believer in 1 Corinthians 1:12 and 1 Corinthians 3:4, John the Baptist in the negative (οὐκ εἰμὶ ἐγὼ, 'I am not') in John 3:28 and Acts 13:25 (compare with Jesus in John 8:23, 17:14,16), and Pilate in a question (Μήτι ἐγὼ Ἰουδαῖός εἰμι, 'Am I [a] Jew?') in John 18:35.

== Old Testament ==
ἐγώ εἰμι also occurs without an explicit or implicit predicate nominative in the Septuagint, but instead either with a prepositional phrase such as in "μὴ ἀντὶ θεοῦ ἐγώ εἰμι ..." ("Am I in place of God ...") Genesis 30:2, or with a predicative clause such as in "πάροικος καὶ παρεπίδημος ἐγώ εἰμι μεθ' ὑμῶν" ("As a foreigner and a sojourner I am with you") in Genesis 23:4, or with the idiomatic meaning 'It is I' such as in "καὶ εἶπεν Ἰωαβ ἀκούω ἐγώ εἰμι" ("And Joab said: I hear; it is I") in 2 Samuel 20:17.

It has been suggested that the unique expression of the Tetragrammaton יהוה (YHWH) is a verbal cognate noun derived from היה (hayah), the Hebrew linking (or 'copular' or 'copulative') verb, 'to be'. Translations often render this word in compliance with the tradition of the Septuagint, "Lord".

== In Christian philosophy ==
The philosopher Joseph de Torre, commenting on the philosophical implications of "I am" as the name of God, wrote:

Aristotle conceived God as the First Mover but outside the world, because of his defective concept of "act", which is more physical than metaphysical. What St. Thomas did was to take this concept and raise it to a metaphysical plane, and then he combined it with Plato's concept of "participation". But he did all this under the guiding light of the faith, since it is the Bible that describes God as HE WHO IS (Exodus, 3): he saw that God is the fullness of being, the very Act of Being, the perfection of being, the subsistent act of being; and everything else is a participation in the act of being, which must be created by God "out of nothing", since God cannot share His infinite act of being.

== See also ==
- "I Am": Eucharistic Meditations on the Gospel
- I Am that I Am
- Ego eimi
- Holy Name of Jesus
- Names and titles of Jesus in the New Testament
- The Thunder, Perfect Mind
- Dinanukht
