= Revelation 1 =

- ← Jude chapter 2 →
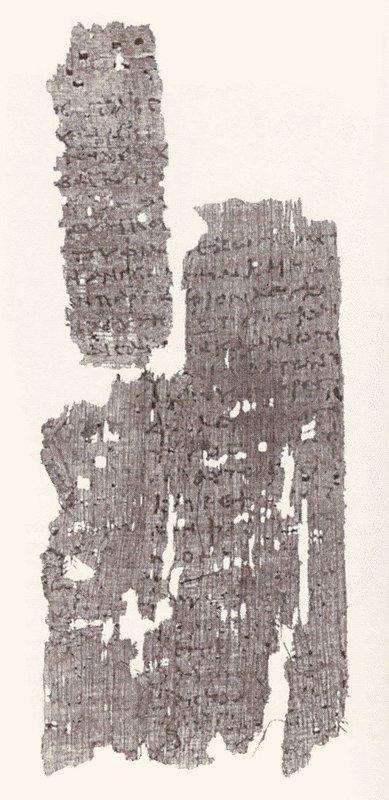
- Revelation 1:13–2:1 on the verso side of Papyrus 98 from the second century.
- Book: Book of Revelation
- Category: Apocalypse
- Christian Bible part: New Testament
- Order in the Christian part: 27

Revelation 1 is the first chapter of the Book of Revelation or the Apocalypse of John in the New Testament of the Christian Bible. The book is traditionally attributed to John the Apostle, but the precise identity of the author is a point of academic debate. This chapter contains the prologue of the book, followed by the vision and commission of John.

== Text ==
The original text was written in Koine Greek. This chapter is divided into 20 verses.

=== Textual witnesses ===
Some early manuscripts containing the text of this chapter are among others: (Note: The Book of Revelation is missing from Codex Vaticanus.)

- Papyrus 98 (2nd century; extant verses 13–20)
- Papyrus 18 (3rd/4th century; extant verses 4–7)
- Codex Sinaiticus (330-360)
- Codex Alexandrinus (400-440)
- Codex Ephraemi Rescriptus (c. 450; extant verses 3-20)

=== Old Testament references ===
Among the Old Testament references in this chapter, about half of them in the verses 7–20 come from the Book of Daniel, especially Daniel 7 and 10. Beale, therefore, regards this part of the chapter as a "midrash." (A midrash is an ancient commentary on part of the Hebrew scriptures.) Those two chapters of Daniel describe the "Son of man," which is used by John as a model in the framework of his writing, as partially listed in the following table:

Revelation 1:13-16	Daniel 10:5-6
1:13 one like a son of man, wearing an ankle-length robe, with a gold sash around his chest	10:5 a man dressed in linen with a belt of fine gold around his waist
1:14 his eyes were like a fiery flame	10:6 his eyes were like fiery torches
1:15 His feet were like polished brass refined in a furnace	10:6 his arms and feet looked like burnished bronze
1:15 his voice was like the sound of rushing water	10:6 the sound of his voice was like the roar of a multitude
1:16 his face shone like the sun at its brightest	10:6 his face shone like lightning

Others

- Revelation 1:4: Exodus 3:14
- Revelation 1:7: Daniel 7:13; Zechariah 12:10
- Revelation 1:13: Daniel 7:13
- Revelation 1:18: Isaiah 41:4; Isaiah 44:19;

== Prologue (1:1–8) ==
The prologue to this book, similar to that of the Gospel of John, is a kind of overture, announcing the main themes while providing the readers with a vantage point to interpret the visions that follow. This part shares some features and forms an inclusio with the epilogue (Revelation 22:6–21).

=== Verse 1 ===
The revelation from Jesus Christ, which God gave him to show his servants what must soon take place. He made it known by sending his angel to his servant John,

- "Revelation" (apokalupsis): or "apocalypse" (cf. Daniel 2:28–30, 45). This term is used by biblical scholars for a literary genre. The meaning of this Greek word is "to lay bare, make naked, to disclose a truth which before was unknown", or "a manifestation or an appearance of a person" (in this case, the appearance of Jesus Christ; cf. Colossians 1:26). This opening verse states that God the Father sent his messenger (the involvement of holy angels as in the Torah; cf. Galatians 3:19) to make known to John the apostle previously undisclosed truths about the person of the resurrected Christ, which is the main theme of the book. Angels are mentioned over 70 times in the Book of Revelation, and in every chapter except two (4, 13).
- "From Jesus Christ": the Greek form of "Jesus Christ" is subjective genitive, denoting Jesus as the author, not the subject, of the book, and he is shown as the revealer throughout the book.
- "Must soon take place": The anticipation is that these previously unknown events would materialize on the world stage imminently (tachos), in line with the notion that "it is the last time" (1 John 2:18).
- For discussion of the identity of "John", see Authorship of the Johannine works.

=== Verse 2 ===
Who bore witness to the word of God, and to the testimony of Jesus Christ, to all things that he saw.

- John, who had the last word in the canonical order of the gospels, also has the last word of the New Testament as he bears witness and testifies to that which he has seen and heard, two words which he frequently uses in all genres of his writings to describe a special function in his ministry: his firsthand accounts of the words and works of Christ (John 21:24, 1 John 1:2, Revelation 1:2).
- "The testimony of Jesus Christ" in the book of Revelation is essentially the same testimony Jesus gave during his earthly ministry, which primarily concerned 'his coming Kingdom' and 'the future of the nation of Israel'.

=== Verse 3 ===
Blessed is he who reads and those who hear the words of this prophecy, and keep those things which are written in it; for the time is near.

- This is the first of the so called 'seven beatitudes' in the book of Revelation (cf. 14:13, 16:15; 19:9; 20:6; 22:7,14), which are pronounced on the readers, the hearers (to whom the book are read aloud, according to the custom in the antiquity) and those who heed the message (Revelation 1:3, Revelation 1:3; cf. 1 Timothy 4:13).
- "For the time is near": may refer to Daniel 7:22b about the time when "the saints will take possession of the kingdom".

=== Verse 4 ===
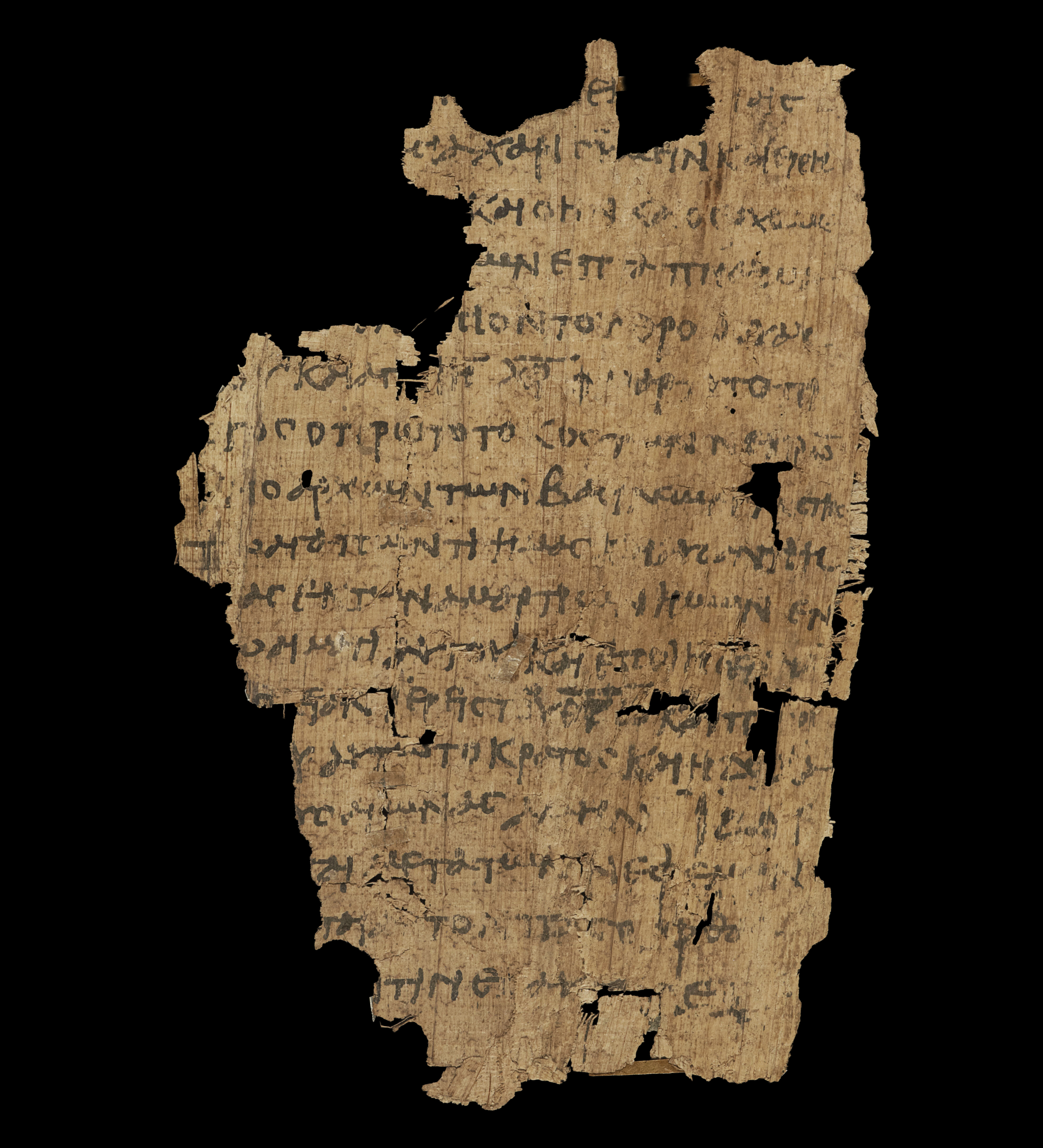
Revelation 1:4–7 on Papyrus 18 (3rd/4th century)

John, to the seven churches which are in Asia:

Grace to you and peace from Him who is and who was and who is to come, and from the seven Spirits who are before His throne. The number 7 occurs 58 times in The Revelation with its first appearance here in Rev 1:4.

- Evangelical Tom Meyer notes that, like Paul—who is traditionally said to have written to seven churches (in Thessalonica, Galatia, Corinth, Philippi, Rome, Colossae, Ephesus)—John also writes to seven churches: in Ephesus, Smyrna, Pergamum, Thyatira, Sardis, Philadelphia, and Laodicea, which are in the province of Asia.
- "Grace": In this customary apostolic greeting John summarizes God's redemptive plan by extending grace and peace to the seven churches, giving the completeness (Shalom, translated "peace") which is in Christ.

=== Verse 5 ===
and from Jesus Christ the faithful witness, the firstborn of the dead, and the ruler of kings on earth.

To him who loves us and has freed us from our sins by his blood,

- "Faithful witness": as Jesus testifies the truth (John 18:37), to be the model for Christians who died as "witnesses" (Revelation 2:13; 11:7; Revelation 17:6). This is the first of many titles given to the risen Christ in the Book of Revelation, which would remind any reader intimate with the Hebrew Bible of the same title given to YHWH: "the LORD be a true and faithful witness between us" (Jeremiah 42:5); thus, John equates the divinity and unity of the Father and the Son who came “to bear witness unto the truth” (John 18:37).
- The blessing in verses 4–5 is believed to be Trinitarian with a complex background by Beasley-Murray. The first element reflects the name of God as revealed to Moses (Exodus 3:14) with the interpretation of contemporary Jews which expands 'I am who I am' to 'I am he who is, and who was, and I am he who will be' (Jerusalem Targum on Deuteronomy 32:20). The second element in the form of the seven spirits before his throne denotes the Holy Spirit (cf. Zechariah 4:6, 10; Revelation 5:6). The third element, Jesus, is given with an apt description for the believers, that is, as 'the supreme witness for God, and he died on account of his witness' (cf. Mark 14:62–63; 1 Timothy 6:13), whereas the Greek term 'witness' has become the English word 'martyr'.
- "The firstborn from the dead, and the ruler of the kings of the earth": are the second and third titles used in this book to describe the risen Christ, originating from the Psalms, such as Psalm 89:27, which emphasizes the eternality of God's Covenant with the House of David: "Also I will make him my firstborn, higher than the kings of the earth."
- The last stanza of this verse may be quoted from Jacob's last message in Genesis 49 from the section relating to Judah (the tribe of the Christ): "he washed his garments in wine, and his clothes in the blood of grapes" (Genesis 49:11), as the Targum's of Jonathan and Jerusalem as well as the Babylon Talmud (Berakoth 57a) interpret this statement from Genesis 49 to be of the Messiah.

=== Verse 6 ===
and has made us to be a kingdom and priests to serve his God and Father — to him be glory and power for ever and ever! Amen.

- "Kingdom and priests": are 'the vocation promised to Israel' (Exodus 19:6; Isaiah 61:6), which is extended to the church (1 Peter 2:9).

=== Verse 7 ===
Behold, He is coming with clouds, and every eye will see Him, even they who pierced Him. And all the tribes of the earth will mourn because of Him. Even so, Amen.

- This verse is an appendix to the salutation, in which John summarizes the Second Coming of Christ as a divine warrior king by drawing upon a well-known Jewish motif of the Messiah coming on the clouds found in the Hebrew Bible (Daniel 7:13) and in the New Testament (Matthew 24:30) as well as related to his departure in a cloud: "and a cloud received him out of their sight" (Acts 1:9) that he will return in like manner. As in his gospel (John 19:37), John quotes Zechariah 12:10: "they shall look upon me whom they have pierced" in this verse.

=== Verse 8 ===
I am Alpha and Omega, the beginning and the ending,

saith the Lord, which is, and which was, and which is to come, the Almighty.

- Cross reference: Isaiah 44:6
- Scrivener's Textus Receptus: Biblical Greek: Ἐγώ εἰμι τὸ Α καὶ τὸ Ω, romanized: ego eimi to A kai to O; . Westcott and Hort: Biblical Greek: Ἐγώ εἰμι τὸ Ἄλφα καὶ τὸ Ὦ, romanized: ego eimi to alpha kai to O.
- Modern translations report the opening words of this verse as "I am the Alpha and the Omega", but the word "the" did not appear in older versions such as the Geneva Bible and the King James Version.
- God speaks here for the first time regarding his eternal nature, quoting Isaiah 44:6: "Thus says the Lord, the King of Israel, and his Redeemer, the Lord of hosts: I am the first, and I am the last; besides me there is no god." John's three-fold statement of "who is, who was, and who is to come" is paralleled by a rabbinical pronouncement: “The seal of God is emet,” (Yomba 69b; Emet, meaning “truth” contains the first, the middle, and the last letters of the [Hebrew] alphabet, as Jews draw on Yomba 69b to say God is the beginning, the middle, and the end of all things.). Josephus also described God as "the beginning, middle, and end of all things” (Against Apion 2.190). The title "the Almighty" means having dominion over all, and is translated in the LXX as "the Lord of Hosts."

Although Revelation 1:8 is sometimes used to assert Jesus Christ is God, nearly all scholarly authorities on the book of Revelation have interpreted the speaker in Rev 1.8 as God the Father, not Jesus Christ.

G.R. Beasley-Murray says of Jesus therein, “Older expositors sometimes thought that Jesus is the speaker here also, but clearly the view is mistaken; it is spoken by the ‘Lord God’ (RV) … the Almighty,”

== John's Vision and Commission (1:9–20) ==
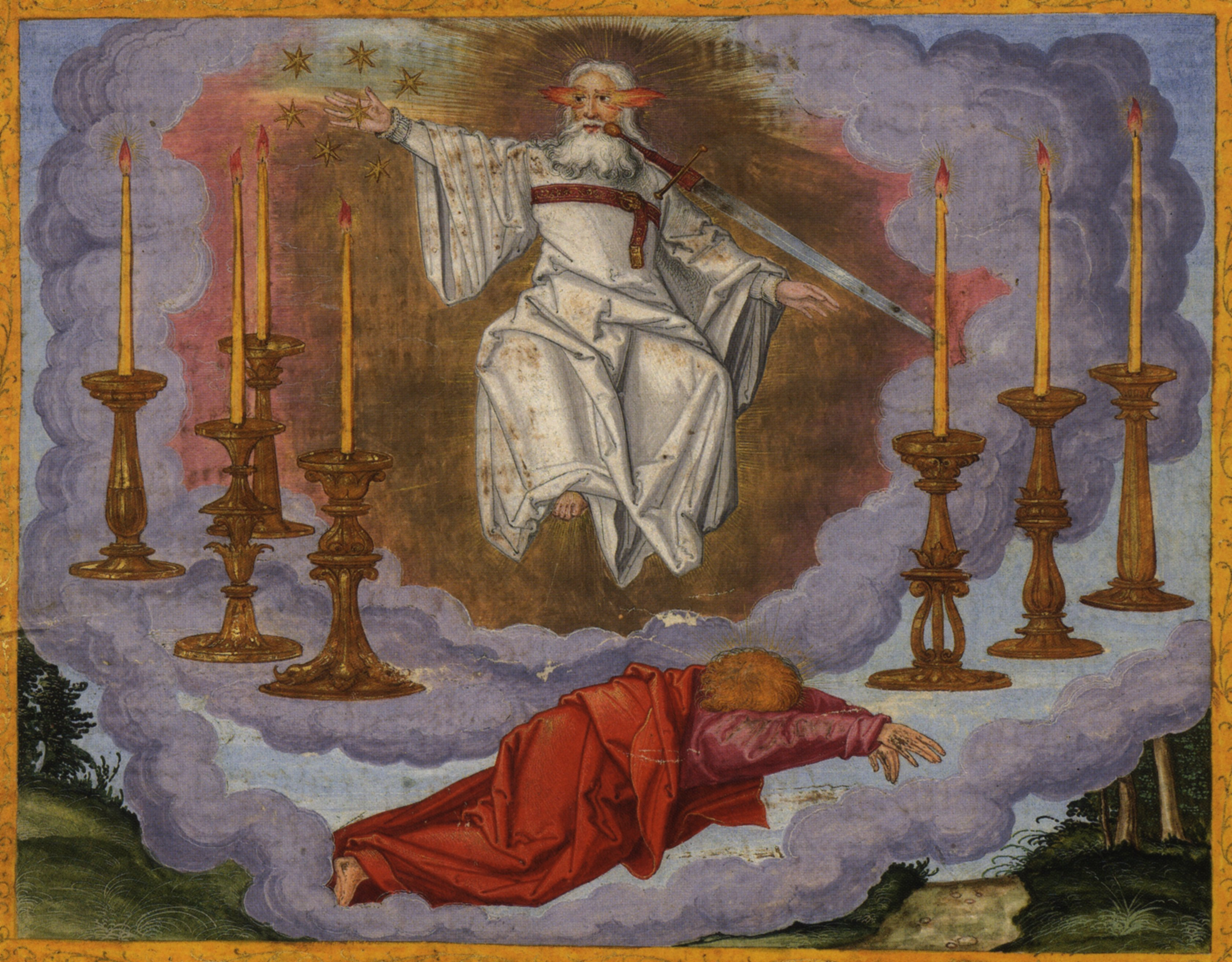
The Vision of the Seven Candlesticks, Revelation 1:12-20 in Ottheinrich-Bibel, by Matthias Gerung (1500–1570)

John received the vision as the occasion of his call to receive and write the book of Revelation while he had been banished to Patmos due to his preaching of the word of God and the testimony of Jesus Christ. The manner he received his visions was similar to how Old Testament prophets Isaiah (Isaiah 6), Jeremiah (Jeremiah 1), Daniel (Daniel 10), and Ezekiel (Ezekiel 1) received theirs.

=== Verse 9 ===
I, John, both your brother and companion in the tribulation and kingdom and patience of Jesus Christ, was on the island that is called Patmos for the word of God and for the testimony of Jesus Christ.

- "Patmos": is present day Patino, a small island in the Aegean Sea. Pliny the Elder in his Natural History says the site is "about thirty miles in circumference", it lay next to the churches (of Asia Minor) on the continent, and is said to be about forty miles southwest of Ephesus, from whence John came thither, and to which church he writes first; how he came here he does not say, concealing, through modesty, his sufferings he did not come here of his own accord." Not much information can be found from the ancient writings about the specific charge that put John in exile here apart from his own testimony "because of the witness about Jesus," except from a few writings of the church fathers: Ignatius in his Epistle to Tarsus says that John was banished to Patmos by Domitian emperor of Rome and Irenaeus in his Against Heresies says it happened at the latter end of Domitian's reign, about the year 95 or 96.

=== Verse 10 ===
I was in the Spirit on the Lord’s Day, and I heard behind me a loud voice, as of a trumpet,

- John, like the Old Testament Hebrew prophets, speaks the oracles of God in the Spirit, similar to in the Old Testament (cf. Zechariah 7:12).
- "The Lord's Day": is believed by many to refer to Sunday, the weekly day most Christians worship on though this is disputed by some Christians. This day can also be rendered as the "day of the Lord," and called "the Tribulation," a dispensation (time) in which God will deal with wicked men directly and dramatically in judgment, which is followed by a time of peace with Christ physically ruling from Jerusalem. The events of the Day of the Lord are: the ultimate overthrow of God's enemies (Isaiah 2:12), the day of national deliverance for the nation of Israel (Zechariah 12:9), and a day of salvation for Israel (Zechariah 12:10), and the Tribulation (Matthew 24:31; cf. Jeremiah 30:7, Joel 2:2, Daniel 12:1), which will not be brief as it is comparable to a woman's labor before giving birth (Isaiah 13:8, Micah 4:9, Matthew 24:8), preceding Christ's appearance (which won't happen until this period has run its course; cf. Revelation chapters 6-19)."

=== Verse 11 ===
The map of West Anatolia (formerly the province of Asia) showing the island of Patmos and the location of the seven churches mentioned in the Book of Revelation.

saying, "I am the Alpha and the Omega, the First and the Last," and, "What you see, write in a book and send it to the seven churches which are in Asia: to Ephesus, to Smyrna, to Pergamos, to Thyatira, to Sardis, to Philadelphia, and to Laodicea.

- "The first and the last": is from Isaiah 41:4. John notes twelve times in the book, that he wrote this book by divine command (Revelation 1:11). The seven churches are named in the proper order, beginning at Ephesus, the nearest to Patmos, proceeding in a circle along the Roman postal route.

=== Verse 12 ===
Then I turned to see the voice that spoke with me. And having turned I saw seven golden lampstands,

- The imagery of seven golden lampstands refers to the seven-branched lampstand in the Jerusalem Temple (Exodus 25:31; Zechariah 4:2).
- The scenario of John hearing God's message beginning behind him echoes the encounters with God from Isaiah 30:21, "and thine ears shall hear a word behind thee", and Ezekiel 3:12, "and I hear behind me a voice of a great rushing." These seven lampstands like those which decorated the interior of the Tabernacle: “and thou shalt make the seven lamps” (Exodus 25:37) are comparable to those in the vision of Zechariah: “and his seven lamps” (Zechariah 4:2), as in the tabernacle, natural light was excluded and only the lampstands would emanate light.

=== Verse 13 ===
and in the midst of the seven lampstands One like the Son of Man, clothed with a garment down to the feet and girded about the chest with a golden band.

- The seven lamps by seven oil-filled channels (like a menorah) may refer to the golden lampstand of Zechariah 4:1–7.
- "Son of Man": is used by Old Testament authors and most frequently in the New Testament by Jesus to call himself (over 30 times).
- "A garment": the same garment of rank worn by the High Priest during the Mosaic dispensation is worn by Christ; the same Greek word is used for "ephod" in the LXX (Exodus 28:4) as well as by Josephus, who also states that the High Priest's robe "went down to the feet" (Antiquities 1.3.7.4).
- "Girded …with a golden band": same as the girdle of the ephod for the priest: "and the curious girdle of the ephod…shall be of gold" (Exodus 28:4). According to the Talmud, the priests did not gird themselves in the place in which they sweat, that is to say, they did not gird neither below their loins, nor above their armpits, but only across the chest (Zevachim 18b), like Christ here, emphasizing that "the risen Christ now functions as the High Priest for his kingdom of priests".

=== Verse 14 ===
His head and hair were white like wool, as white as snow, and His eyes like a flame of fire;

- Christ in his resurrected state still identifies with mankind as well as with his obvious divine nature as John describes him in language characteristic of Old Testament descriptions of God such as the Ancient of days whose hair was like the pure wool: "and the hair of his head like the pure wool" (Daniel 7:9) and the messenger in a vision of Daniel who had eyes as lamps of fire: "and his eyes as lamps of fire" (Daniel 10:6).

=== Verse 15 ===
His feet were like fine brass, as if refined in a furnace, and His voice as the sound of many waters;

- The Old Testament prophets also state about the feet of the Lord that is bare and like glowing brass (Daniel 10:6) as the priest would also be bare foot in the Holy Place (Babylonian Talmud Sotah 40a) as well as the voice of the Almighty "like a noise of many waters" (Ezekiel 1:24, 43:2).

=== Verse 16 ===
He had in His right hand seven stars, out of His mouth went a sharp two-edged sword, and His countenance was like the sun shining in its strength.

- "The right hand" is the clean hand (Psalm 118:16) to securely protect the leaders of the churches.

=== Verse 17 ===
When I saw him, I fell at his feet as though dead. Then he placed his right hand on me and said: "Do not be afraid. I am the First and the Last."

- The reaction of John to 'the vision of the exalted Lord' is similar to that of those with such experiences (cf. Isaiah 6:5). Manoah was afraid that he should die, but did not fall down as dead (Judges 13:22); Ezekiel fell on his face, but still had his senses (Ezekiel 1:28); Daniel lost his strength, he fainted, and fell into a deep sleep (Daniel 10:8–9); but John fell down at once, as dead. This panic of those good men arose from a notion that people would die when they ever saw God; that's why Jacob wonders, and is thankful, that he had seen God face to face, but stayed alive (Genesis 32:30). This was also a customary position to assume when desiring to show respect (cf. 1 Samuel 25:23).
- "The First and the Last": is a virtual exposition of Alpha and Omega in verse 8 (cf. Isaiah 44:6; 48:12).
- "Do not be afraid": Same as here, Christ once told John not to be afraid when he stilled the storm: "it is I, be not afraid" (John 6:20), which also mirrors the same words of comfort to the prophet Daniel: "fear not Daniel" (Daniel 10:12), and also often used in the Old Testament to comfort the people of Israel and remove their fear: "I the LORD, the first, and with the last" (Isaiah 41:4)."

=== Verse 18 ===
I am the Living One; I was dead, and now look, I am alive for ever and ever! And I hold the keys of death and Hades.

- "Hades": here as synonym of Death (5:25–29).
- "Hold the keys" indicates total authority, as also in Matthew 16:19; cf. Psalm 116:3).

=== Verse 19 ===
Write the things which you have seen, and the things which are, and the things which will take place after this.

This verse contains a summary of the contents of the book of Revelation, that is to write what John had previously seen in the vision of the resurrected Christ (chapter 1), then the current explained condition of the apostolic churches (chapters 2-3), and finally the culmination of history yet to be narrated in the following chapters (chapters 4-20).

=== Verse 20 ===
The mystery of the seven stars which you saw in My right hand, and the seven golden lampstands: The seven stars are the angels of the seven churches, and the seven lampstands which you saw are the seven churches.

- The stars and lampstands are the sacred interpretation of the symbolism of the heavenly and earthly lights.
- "Seven stars": here refer to the seven churches in Asia Minor, whereas the "twelve stars" in other parts of the Bible (Genesis 37:9; Revelation 12:1) represent the 'twelve tribes of Israel', not the church. Bullinger notes that there was an officer in the synagogues who was called Sheliach Tzibbur or the "Angel of the Assembly" (tzibbur mean "the Assembly"; sheliach means "angel; legate" or "the sent one; messenger") and functions as a cantor or mouthpiece of the congregation, the leader of the divine worship. His duty was to offer up public prayer to God for the whole congregation, that is, as the messenger of the assembly, he spoke to God for them. This position is below the chief officer or Archisynagogos ("Ruler of the Synagogue"). The use of the word "synagogue" in two of the seven letters (Revelation 2:9 and 3:9) gives support this interpretation.

== See also ==
- Acts of Apostles
- John the Apostle
- Greek alphabet: Alpha, Chi, Omega, Rho
- Names and titles of Jesus in the New Testament: Alpha and Omega
- Seven Spirits of God
- John's vision of the Son of Man
- Seven churches of Asia
- Related Bible parts: Daniel 7, Zechariah 12, Revelation 2, Revelation 3, Revelation 21, Revelation 22

== Sources ==
- Bauckham, Richard (2007). "81. Revelation". In Barton, John; Muddiman, John (eds.). The Oxford Bible Commentary (first (paperback) ed.). Oxford University Press. pp. 1287–1306. ISBN 978-0199277186.
- Beale, G. K. (1999). The Book of Revelation. The New International Greek Testament Commentary. Vol. 21. Wm. B. Eerdmans Publishing. ISBN 9780802821744.
- Beasley-Murray, George R. (1994). "Revelation". In Carson, D. A.; France, R. T.; Motyer, J. A.; Wenham, G. J. (eds.). New Bible Commentary: 21st Century Edition (4, illustrated, reprint, revised ed.). Inter-Varsity Press. pp. 1421–1455. ISBN 9780851106489.
- Bullinger, Ethelbert (2007). Commentary on Revelation: Or, the Apocalypse. Cosimo, Inc. ISBN 9781602061125.
- Coogan, Michael David (2007). Coogan, Michael David; Brettler, Marc Zvi; Newsom, Carol Ann; Perkins, Pheme (eds.). The New Oxford Annotated Bible with the Apocryphal/Deuterocanonical Books: New Revised Standard Version, Issue 48 (Augmented 3rd ed.). Oxford University Press. ISBN 9780195288810.
- Cross, F. L. (1997). The Oxford Dictionary of the Christian Church. New York: Oxford University Press.
- Elliott, J. K. (2012). "Revelations from the apparatus criticus of the Book of Revelation: How Textual Criticism Can Help Historians". Union Seminary Quarterly Review. 63 (3–4).
- Evans, Craig A (2005). Craig A Evans (ed.). Bible Knowledge Background Commentary: John, Hebrews-Revelation. Colorado Springs, Colo.: Victor. ISBN 0781442281.
- Garland, Anthony Charles (2007). A Testimony of Jesus Christ - Volume 2: A Commentary on the Book of Revelation. Vol. 1 (illustrated, revised ed.). SpiritAndTruth.org. ISBN 978-0978886417.
- Osborne, Grant R. (2002). Revelation. Baker Exegetical Commentary on the New Testament. Vol. 27. Baker Academic. ISBN 9780801022999.
