= Revelation 3 =

- ← chapter 2 chapter 4 →
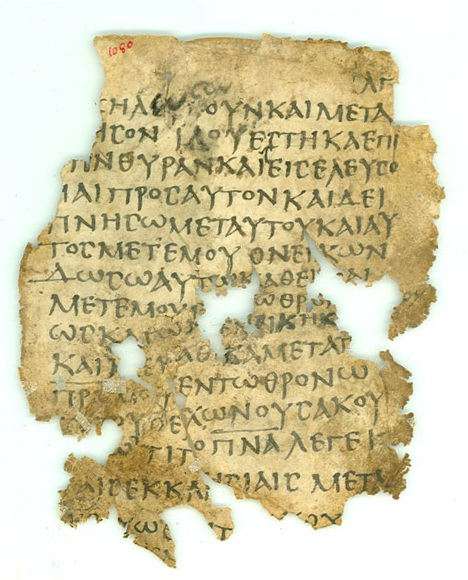
- Revelation 3:19-4:3 on Uncial 0169 from the fourth century.
- Book: Book of Revelation
- Category: Apocalypse
- Christian Bible part: New Testament
- Order in the Christian part: 27

Revelation 3 is the third chapter of the Book of Revelation or the Apocalypse of John in the New Testament of the Christian Bible. The book is traditionally attributed to John the Apostle, but the precise identity of the author remains a point of academic debate. This chapter contains messages to the churches of Sardis and Philadelphia and Laodicea, three of the seven churches of Asia located in modern-day Turkey, continuing from the messages for the other four churches which appear in chapter 2.

== Text ==
The original text was written in Koine Greek. This chapter is divided into 22 verses.

=== Textual witnesses ===
Some early manuscripts containing the text of this chapter are among others: (Note: The Book of Revelation is missing from Codex Vaticanus.)

- Papyrus 115 (c. 275; extant verses 10–12)
- Codex Sinaiticus (330-360)
- Uncial 0169 (4th century; extant verses 19–22)
- Codex Alexandrinus (400-440)
- Codex Ephraemi Rescriptus (c. 450; extant verses 1–19)

The map of West Anatolia (formerly the province of Asia) showing the island of Patmos and the location of the seven churches mentioned in the Book of Revelation.

=== Old Testament references ===
- Revelation 3:7: Isaiah 22:22
- Revelation 3:19: Proverbs 3:11

== The message to Sardis (verses 1–6) ==
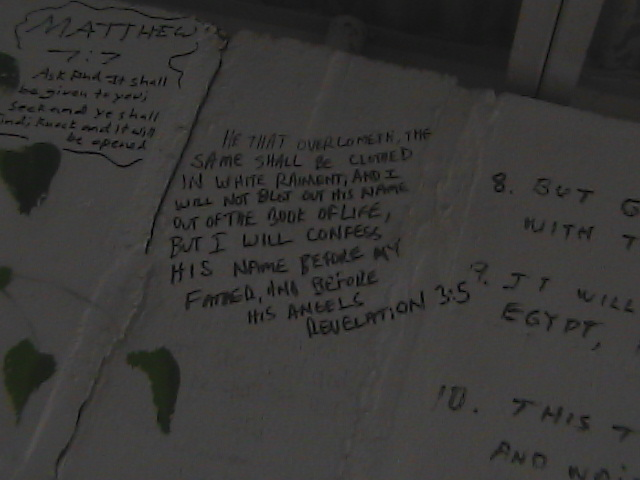
Graffito of Rev 3:5 at Waimanalo Beach

=== Verse 1 ===
"And to the angel of the church in Sardis write,

‘These things says He who has the seven Spirits of God and the seven stars: "I know your works, that you have a name that you are alive, but you are dead."'"

The Textus Receptus has the words Biblical Greek: το ονομα, romanized: to onoma, the name. Biblical exegete Heinrich Meyer notes that the definite article (το) does not appear in several of the ancient manuscripts and is "to be deleted". The Douai-Rheims translation and the Revised Standard Version refer to "the name" whereas the New Revised Standard Version and many modern translations refer to "a name"; the meaning is interpreted as "a reputation" by the Amplified Bible and the New International Version.

== The message to Philadelphia (verses 7–13) ==
=== Verse 7 ===
“And to the angel of the church in Philadelphia write,

‘These things says He who is holy, He who is true, “He who has the key of David, He who opens and no one shuts, and shuts and no one opens”:

The citation is from Isaiah 22:22.

=== Verse 8 ===
I know what you do; I know that you have a little power; you have followed my teaching and have been faithful to me. I have opened a door in front of you, which no one can close.

=== Verse 9 ===
Indeed I will make those of the synagogue of Satan, who say they are Jews and are not, but lie—indeed I will make them come and worship before your feet, and to know that I have loved you.

The words Dilexi te, "I have loved you" form the incipit (title) and closing words of Pope Leo XIV's apostolic exhortation On Love for the Poor, published in October 2025.

=== Verse 10 ===
Because you have kept the word of My perseverance, I also will keep you from the hour of testing, that hour which is about to come upon the whole world, to test those who dwell on the earth.

=== Verse 11 ===
Look, I am coming soon! Hold tightly to the little strength you have—so that no one will take away your crown.

=== Verse 12 ===
Him that overcometh will I make a pillar in the temple of my God,

and he shall go no more out:

and I will write upon him the name of my God,

and the name of the city of my God,

which is new Jerusalem,

which cometh down out of heaven from my God:

and I will write upon him my new name.

Cross reference: Isaiah 56:5

=== Verse 13 ===
"Anyone with ears to hear must listen to the Spirit and understand what he is saying to the churches".

== The message to Laodicea (verses 14–22) ==
=== Verse 14 ===
And to the angel of the church of the Laodiceans write,

'These things says the Amen, the Faithful and True Witness, the Beginning of the creation of God:'

In Isaiah 65:16 - he who blesses himself in the earth shall bless himself in the God of truth - the literal translation refers to the God of Amen. The Common English Bible gives the translation as "the God called Amen".

=== Verse 15 ===
I know your works, that you are neither cold nor hot.

According to the Jamieson-Fausset-Brown commentary, "cold" must mean "more than negatively cold", i.e. not warm: it must mean "positively, icy cold: never warmed", while "hot" literally means "boiling" or "fervent". They comment that "the lukewarm state (verse 16), if it be the transitional stage to a warmer, is a desirable state (for a little religion, if real, is better than none); but most fatal when, as here, an abiding condition, for it is mistaken for a safe state."

=== Verse 18 ===
I counsel you to buy from Me gold refined in the fire,

that you may be rich;

and white garments, that you may be clothed,

that the shame of your nakedness may not be revealed;

and anoint your eyes with eye salve,

that you may see.

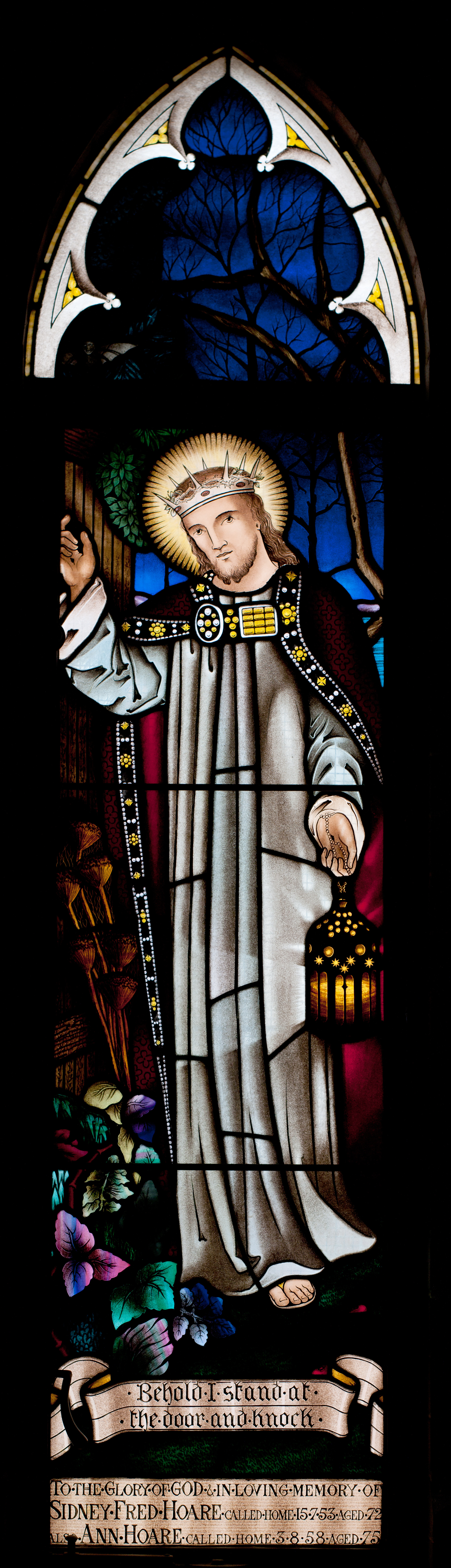
Revelation 3:20 on the stained glass window depicting Jesus at St Alban's Anglican Church, Five Dock, New South Wales, Australia

=== Verse 20 ===
Behold, I stand at the door and knock. If anyone hears My voice and opens the door, I will come in to him and dine with him, and he with Me.

The vision of Christ "standing at the door" may be expressive of the near approach, or sudden coming of Christ to judgment (see James 5:9), and his knocking may signify the notice that will be given of it, by some of the immediate forerunners and signs of his coming; which yet will be observed but by a few, such a general sleepiness will have seized all professors of religion; and particularly may intend the midnight cry, which will, in its issue, rouse them all.

== Uses ==
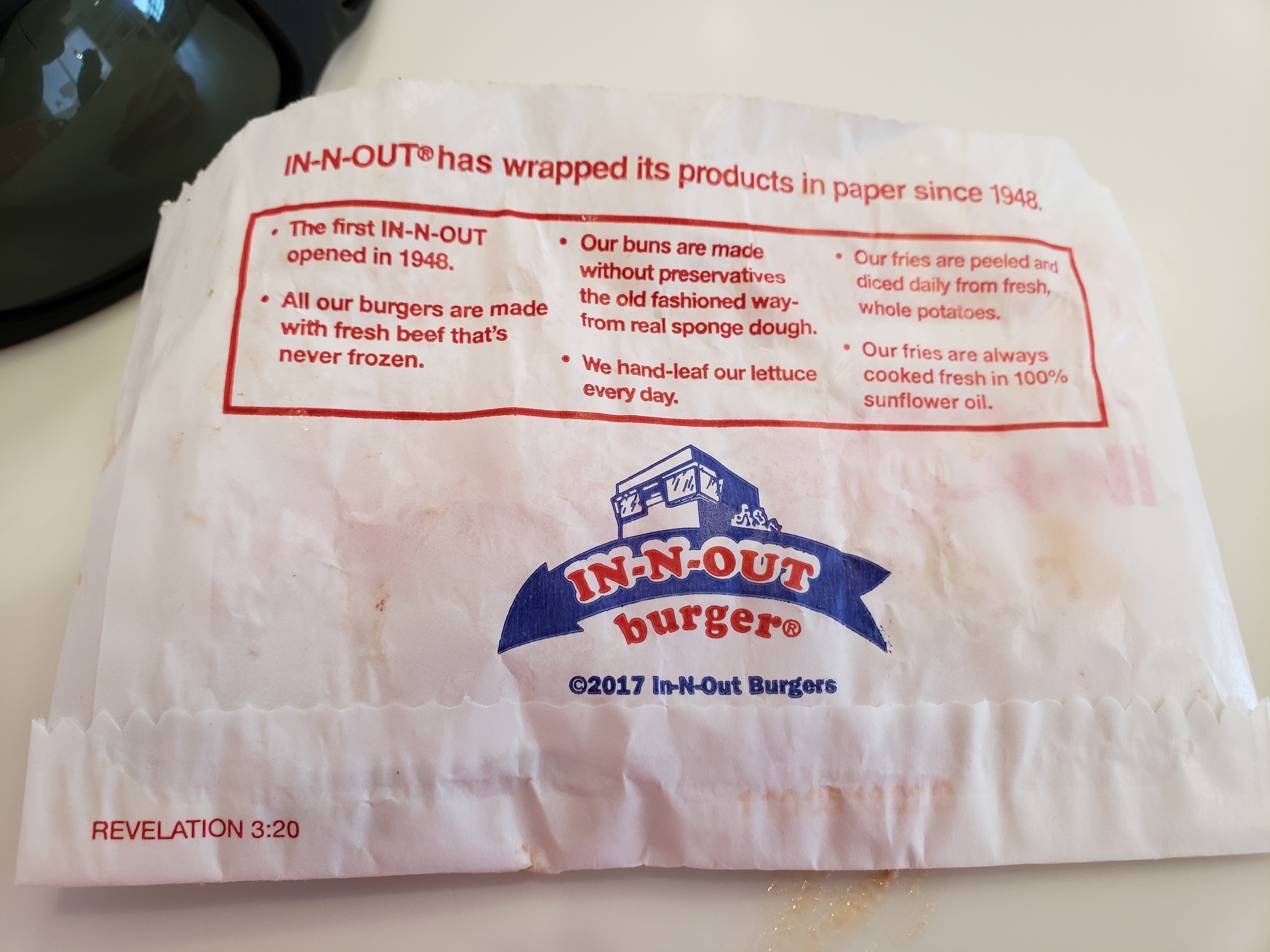
The wrapper of a hamburger from In-N-Out Burger featuring a bible verse from the Book of Revelation.

The hamburger and cheeseburger wrappers of In-N-Out Burger has the text "REVELATION 3:20", which refers to verse 20 of this chapter.

== See also ==
- Acts of Apostles
- David
- Jesus Christ
- John's vision of the Son of Man
- John the Apostle
- Seven churches of Asia
- Synagogue of Satan
- Related Bible parts: Isaiah 22, Philippians 4, Revelation 1, Revelation 2, Revelation 20

== Bibliography ==
- Bauckham, Richard (2007). "81. Revelation". In Barton, John; Muddiman, John (eds.). The Oxford Bible Commentary (first (paperback) ed.). Oxford University Press. pp. 1287–1306. ISBN 978-0199277186.
