= Revelation 20 =

- ← chapter 19 chapter 21 →
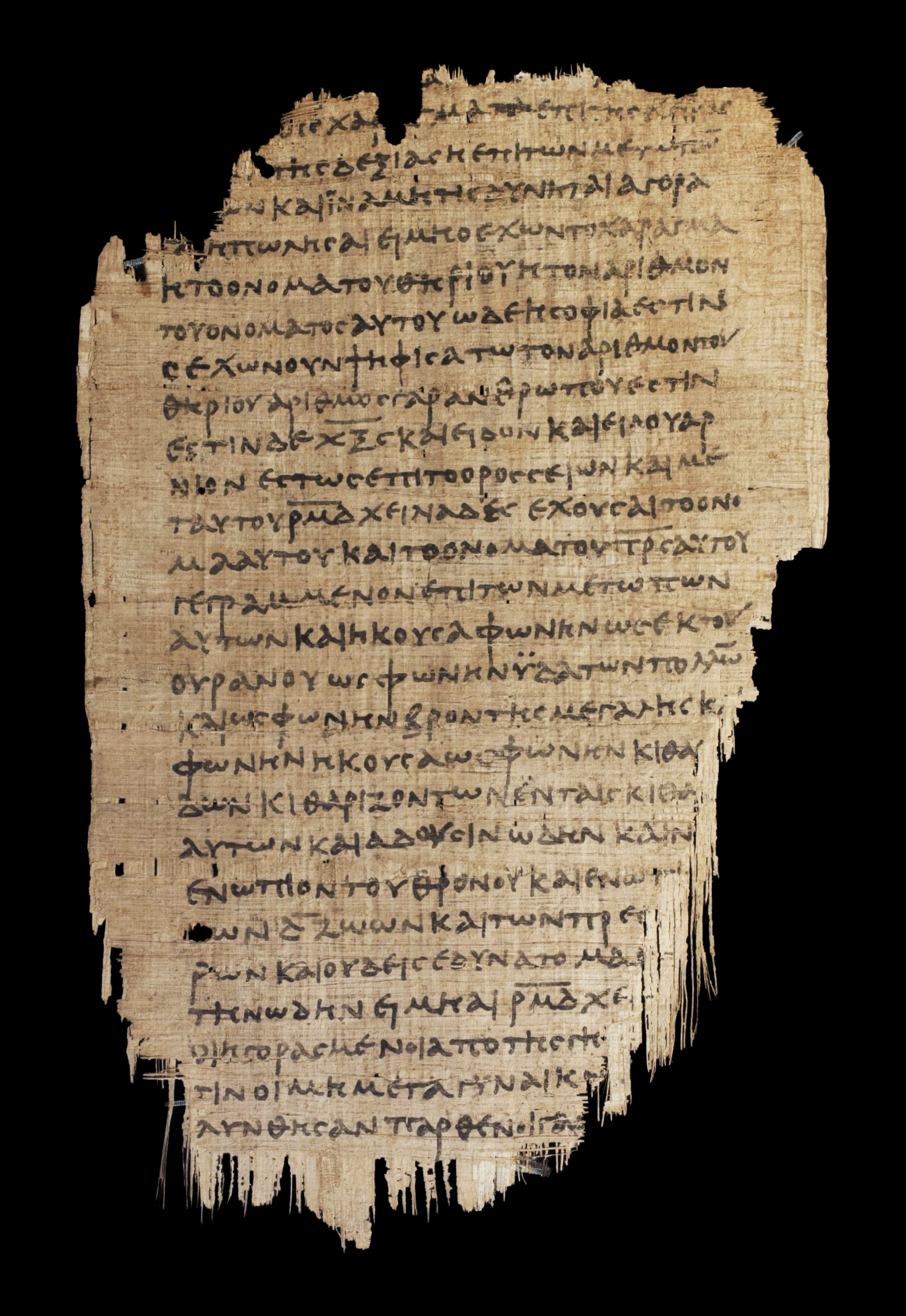
- Revelation 13:16-14:4 on Papyrus 47 from the third century.
- Book: Book of Revelation
- Category: Apocalypse
- Christian Bible part: New Testament
- Order in the Christian part: 27

Revelation 20 is the twentieth chapter of the Book of Revelation or the Apocalypse of John in the New Testament of the Christian Bible. The book is traditionally attributed to John the Apostle, but the precise identity of the author remains a point of academic debate. This chapter contains the notable account of the "Millennium" and the judgment of the dead.

== Apocalipse 20 ==
The original text was written in Koine Greek. This chapter is divided into 15 verses.

=== Textual witnesses ===
Some early manuscripts containing the text of this chapter are among others: (Note: The Book of Revelation is missing from Codex Vaticanus and this chapter is missing from Codex Ephraemi Rescriptus.)

- Codex Sinaiticus (AD 330-360)
- Codex Alexandrinus (400-440)

=== Old Testament references ===
- Revelation 20:8: Ezekiel 38:2; Ezekiel 39:1

=== New Testament references ===
- Revelation 20:12: Revelation 3:5

== The Millennium (20:1–10) ==
This passage is the basis for various tradition of Christian 'millenarianism'.

=== Verse 1 ===
I saw an angel coming down from heaven, having the key to the bottomless pit and a great chain in his hand.

Jesus Christ says in the writer's vision at Revelation 1:18, "I hold the keys of Hades and of Death", leading some interpreters to suggest that the angel observed here is actually Christ. The 17th-century theologian John Gill refers to a suggestion that the prophesied angel was fulfilled in Constantine the Great (272–337 AD). The Ethiopic version reads "the key of the sun".

=== Verse 2 ===
He laid hold of the dragon, that serpent of old, who is the Devil and Satan, and bound him for a thousand years;

- "The dragon" is the 'ultimate principle of evil', which appeared before the narrative of the two beasts (chapter 12–13), and continues after both of them have perished.

=== Verse 3 ===
and he cast him into the bottomless pit, and shut him up, and set a seal on him, so that he should deceive the nations no more till the thousand years were finished. But after these things he must be released for a little while.

- "Cast him into the bottomless pit": In chapter 12 the dragon was 'thrown from heaven to earth, where he deceived the nations' and now is thrown into the imprisonment in the abyss (cf. Revelation 9:1), prevented to deceive the nations for a long time (cf. Psalm 90:4 for the significance of 'a thousand year').

=== Verse 4 ===
And I saw thrones, and they sat on them, and judgment was committed to them. Then I saw the souls of those who had been beheaded for their witness to Jesus and for the word of God, who had not worshiped the beast or his image, and had not received his mark on their foreheads or on their hands. And they lived and reigned with Christ for a thousand years.

It is not explicit or clear who was seated on the thrones. "The natural construction is that 'judges' sat on them. The New International Version presents the text as:

I saw thrones on which were seated those who had been given authority to judge ...

American theologian Albert Barnes notes the "considerable resemblance, in many respects, between this [wording] and the statement in Daniel 7:9":

As I looked, thrones were set in place, and the Ancient of Days took his seat.

Daniel's vision continues:

The Ancient of Days came, and judgment was given for the saints of the Most High, and the time came when the saints possessed the kingdom

and so the Cambridge Bible for Schools and Colleges argues that those seated on the thrones are these saints of the Most High.

=== Verse 5 ===
But the rest of the dead lived not again until the thousand years were finished. This is the first resurrection.

- "Lived … again": from Greek: ἀνἔζησαν, anezēsan (TR) or ἔζησαν, ezēsan (Greek Orthodox Church NT), in the sense of "not only when restored to life, but when in the act of reviving" (cf. Revelation 2:8).

=== Verse 6 ===
Blessed and holy is he who has part in the first resurrection. Over such the second death has no power, but they shall be priests of God and of Christ, and shall reign with Him a thousand years.

- "Of God and of Christ": This provides a strong proof for "the doctrine of Christ's coequal Deity" with God (= "The Father").

=== Verse 8 ===
and will come out to deceive the nations at the four corners of the earth, Gog and Magog, in order to gather them for battle; they are as numerous as the sands of the sea. (NRSVue)

Hebrew Bible scholar Dr. Kyle Greenwood sees the "four corners" referenced in this verse as referring to, not squared edges, but rather, an idiom related to the four cardinal directions, as seen in the four points of a compass. This expression is also seen in Revelation 7:1, as well as Isaiah 11:12 and Ezekiel 7:2.

=== Verse 10 ===
Then the devil, who had deceived them, was thrown into the fiery lake of burning sulfur, joining the beast and the false prophet. There they will be tormented day and night forever and ever.

== The Judgement of the Dead (20:11-15) ==
=== Verse 12 ===
And I saw the dead, small and great, standing before God, and books were opened. And another book was opened, which is the Book of Life. And the dead were judged according to their works, by the things which were written in the books.

The reference to "judgment based on works" (Biblical Greek: κατὰ τὰ ἔργα αὐτῶν, romanized: kata ta erga auton) is repeated in verse 13. The phrase is Biblical Greek: κατά ὁ ἔργον αὐτός, romanized: kata ho ergon autos ("according to his work") in Tischendorf's critical edition. Biblical commentator Andrew Robert Fausset stresses that "we are justified by faith, judged according to (not by) our works".

=== Verse 14 ===
And Death and Hades were thrown into the lake of fire. The lake of fire is the second death.

=== Verse 15 ===
And anyone not found written in the Book of Life was cast into the lake of fire.

The "lake of fire" is referred to in Revelation 19:20, in verses 10 and 14-15 in this chapter and in Revelation 21:8.

== See also ==
- Book of Life
- Dudael
- Jesus Christ
- John's vision of the Son of Man
- Lake of Fire
- Millennialism
- Names and titles of Jesus in the New Testament
- That Evening Sun
- Related Bible parts: Revelation 4, Revelation 7, Revelation 13, Revelation 18, Revelation 19, Revelation 21

== Sources ==
- Bauckham, Richard (2007). "81. Revelation". In Barton, John; Muddiman, John (eds.). The Oxford Bible Commentary (first (paperback) ed.). Oxford University Press. pp. 1287–1306. ISBN 978-0-19-927718-6.
