= Synagogue of Satan =

Biblical phrase

Synagogue of Satan (Greek: συναγωγή τοῦ Σατανᾶ, romanized: synagōgḗ toũ Satanã) is a phrase from Revelation 2:9 and 3:9 in which Jesus refers to a group persecuting the church, falsely claiming to be Jews. The exact meaning of who the text is referring to is unclear, but there are two prevailing views: either unbelieving Jews who did not recognize Jesus as a Messiah, or Christians who have integrated into practices of the surrounding culture. While it can be antisemitic if taken out of context, John of Patmos, the author of Revelation was likely Jewish and the use of the word "Jew" in Revelation is consistently positive.

Later Church Fathers used the same phrase or similar in polemical writings warning against Jews infiltrating the church, or Christians attending synagogue. During the Reformation, the phrase was used in polemics against the Catholic Church. The Catholic Church instead used the phrase as a descriptor of both the enemies of the church and Freemasonry.

In the modern era, the verses have been used to justify antisemitism by conspiracy theorists and followers of Christian Identity who believe the Serpent seed doctrine that Jews are the literal descendants of Satan. It is also used more generally as a pejorative of any non-Christian religious practices considered to be associated with idolatry or the devil.

== Origin in Revelation ==
In the New Testament book of Revelation, in the letters to the early Christian churches of Smyrna and Philadelphia in Revelation 2:9 and 3:9, the author quotes Jesus as speaking of the Synagogue of Satan, in each case referring to a group persecuting the church "who say they are Jews and are not".

And to the angel of the church in Smyrna write: "The words of the first and the last, who died and came to life. I know your tribulation and your poverty (but you are rich) and the slander of those who say that they are Jews and are not, but are a synagogue of Satan."

— Revelation 2:8–9 (ESV)

And to the angel of the church in Philadelphia write... "I know your works. Behold, I have set before you an open door, which no one is able to shut. I know that you have but little power, and yet you have kept my word and have not denied my name. Behold, I will make those of the synagogue of Satan who say that they are Jews and are not, but lie—behold, I will make them come and bow down before your feet, and they will learn that I have loved you."

— Revelation 3:7–9 (ESV)

While the phrase "synagogue of Satan" is a negative term, the precise meaning in the text is uncertain. The association of Jews with Satan begins not in Revelation, but in the Gospel of John. In John 8:44, Jesus charges the Jewish authorities as being of the devil. Biblical scholar Stefan Schreiber draws parallels from this passage, Rev 2:9, 3:9, and Acts: "The devil as the opponent per se functions as a paradigm of the opposing Jewish majority refusing to accept Christ; so in John 8:44, the Jewish authorities are charged with having the devil as their father, and in Rev 2:9, 3:9, the Jewish communities in Asia Minor are dismissed as 'synagogue of Satan'. An opponent of the Christian mission from outside is called 'son of the devil' in Acts 13:10".

There are two prevailing views of who is being referred to in this passage. The dominant view that it refers to unbelieving Jews, or those Jews who do not recognize Christ as Messiah. The Oxford Handbook of the Book of Revelation summarizes this as "hostile ethnic Jews... no longer belong to the true community of God, the in-group, but to the 'synagogue of Satan,' the out-group. Thus, the true people of God are no longer 'those who say that they are Jews' but those who worship the almighty God as revealed in the Lamb that was slain". New Testament scholar James Resseguie points out that according to the argument of various scholars supporting this view, Jews and Christians are locked in intense conflict in the regions to which the letters are addressed, and since Jews do not follow the Lamb, they belong, according to the author of Revelation, to the congregation of Satan.

The alternative view is that this phrasing refers to heretical Christians following other doctrines such as the Nicolaitans or Jezebel. Resseguie describes them as Christians who have integrated into the practices of the surrounding culture, pointing out that while the phrasing may seem antisemitic if taken out of context, the author of Revelation is likely Jewish and use of the word "Jew" in the book is consistently positive.

== Qumran community ==
Language similar to the "synagogue of Satan" phrasing in Revelation appears in the Dead Sea Scrolls, written by the Qumran community that viewed the rest of Judaism as apostate, calling its persecutors "the lot of Belial" (Satan). The Community Rule uses "the lot of Belial" as a contrast to righteous community members. Through sin, humans place themselves in with Belial's lot. This presents a cosmic dualism in which humans are either part of the light or part of the darkness, the lot of God or the lot of Belial.

== Post-Nicene polemics ==
During the Post-Nicene period, the exact phrasing from Revelation as well as similarly themed versions of it were used in various adversus judaeos (against the Jews) polemical writings addressing ongoing conflicts between Christians and Jews. While Jerome was the only Early Church Father to use the exact term "synagogue of Satan" as a pejorative, other Post-Nicene Fathers such as Ambrose of Milan and John Chrysostom wrote on similarly phrased themes.

=== Jerome ===
Jerome used the "synagogue of Satan" phrasing as a polemic in his correspondence with Augustine of Hippo.

If, however, there is for us no alternative but to receive the Jews into the Church, along with the usages prescribed by their law; if, in short, it shall be declared lawful for them to continue in the Churches of Christ what they have been accustomed to practise in the synagogues of Satan, I will tell you my opinion of the matter: they will not become Christians, but they will make us Jews.

— Jerome, Letters of St. Augustine, LXXV

Jerome also used the phrase in his letter to Pammachius and Oceanus, arguing that the Jews "persecute our Lord Jesus Christ in the synagogues of Satan". Additionally, he used the similar phrase "synagogue of antichrist" in his polemical writing.

=== Augustine ===
In addition to the uses by Jerome, the phrase was used by Augustine in at least one clear related usage. In On Baptism, Augustine engages a statement from the African bishop Rogatianus of Nova: "Christ established the Church, the devil heresy: how can the synagogue of Satan have the baptism of Christ?"

=== John Chrysostom ===
Although not using the precise phrase "synagogue of Satan", John Chrysostom developed similar polemical themes in Adversus Judaeos, a series of sermons given in Antioch in 387 specifically to Christians who were attending synagogue services, which Chrysostom equated to blasphemy. In the first of these sermons, Chrysostom called the synagogue a "dwelling of demons".

But when God abandons a people, what hope of salvation is left? When God abandons a place, that place becomes the dwelling of demons.

— John Chrysostom, Adversus Judaeos, 1.3

Chrysostom further attests that the destruction of Jerusalem and the temple was an act of God's wrath and that although there are holy books in the synagogue, that does not make it holy.

=== Ambrose ===
Ambrose was another Post-Nicene writer who developed adversus judaeos themes. He called the synagogue "a place of unbelief, a house of impiety, a shelter of madness, which God himself condemned". In his commentary on the Gospel of Luke, Ambrose associated the synagogue with demon possession, asking, "Wasn't it the Jewish people in the synagogue who are possessed by the unclean spirit of demons?"

=== Dioscorus ===
American theologian William Hatch identified a lost work on Pope Dioscorus I of Alexandria that also uses the phrase "synagogue of Satan".

He was summoned to the synagogue of Satan. When he came in to that place, he saw many more multitudes. On account of this he said, "What deficiency (is there) which the orthodox faith lacks? " They said to him thus: "In the counsel of the king the multitudes have been assembled to pervert the faith." At once he said to them, "If these numerous multitudes have been assembled concerning Jesus Christ, I will sit down and speak in it that which Christ has spoken to my mouth. But I ought to confess the orthodox faith and say thus: Lord Jesus, Emmanuel, our God, has never been divided in all his works; but (he is) one only Lord, one only nature; he has one only will; and the deity has united with the humanity as the soul unites with the flesh. This is my declaration and my confession, - I the least, Dioscorus, the poor.

— Dioscorus

Hatch believed the "synagogue of Satan" here refers to the Council of Chalcedon, which Dioscorus attended in 451 and from which he was deposed and exiled for his miaphysitism.

== Protestant Reformation ==
During the Reformation, the phrase shifted from polemics against Jews to those against the Catholic Church and its offices. In Actes and Monuments, John Foxe refers to the Roman Catholic Church as the synagogue of Satan. Jan Hus used the term in reference to cardinals claiming to be vicars of Christ. In similar fashion, John Stilman, who was tried before the bishop of London in 1518 said the College of Cardinals were Antichrist and "all other inferior prelates and priests are the synagogue of Satan". In Truth's Triumph over Trent, a work comparing Protestantism and the Catholic Church, Puritan theologian Henry Burton referred to the Catholic Church as the apostate synagogue of Antichrist.

== Catholic Church ==
Pope Pius IX used the phrase in multiple instances to describe different things. In 1864, in his Syllabus of Errors, he wrote against the secularizing tendencies of the modern world as "a war ... waged against the Catholic Church", adding in a postscript that this served to strengthen "the synagogue of Satan, which gathers its troops against the Church of Christ".

Later, in the encyclical Etsi multa, in 1873, Pius refers to Freemasonry as "the synagogue of Satan". The term describes groups that teach heresy under the guise of orthodoxy.

Pope Pius IX was not the only pope to use the synagogue of Satan imagery to describe Freemasonry. Pope Leo XIII identified masonic lodges as the "kingdom of Satan" in an 1884 encyclical Humanum genus.

In 1893, Johann Gabriel Leon Luis Meurin wrote La Franc-maçonnerie: Synagogue De Satin (Freemasonry: Synagogue of Satan). Meurin's work described the character of Freemasonry as Jewish, antisocietal, and satanic. It was illustrated with charts and diagrams, giving it the appearance of a scientific approach. Its main idea was that the "Jewish Kabbalah" was the philosophical basis for Freemasonry.

== Conspiracy theories ==
=== Illuminati conspiracy ===
William Guy Carr, who advanced the conspiracy theory that world affairs were controlled by the Illuminati and international bankers, often wrote in his books about a Luciferian conspiracy he attributed to the synagogue of Satan. In his book, Satan, Prince of this World, Carr claimed this was not a reference to Judaism: "I wish to make it clearly and emphatically known that I do not believe the Synagogue of Satan (S.O.S.) is Jewish, but, as Christ told us for a definite purpose, it is comprised of 'I know the blasphemy of them which say they are Jews, and are not, but are the synagogue of Satan.'"

Further, Carr stated that the purpose of the Bible's Old Testament was to describe how Satan had become prince of this world and how "the synagogue of Satan was established on this earth" to thwart God's will. However, Carr's book Pawns in the Game, relying on work by Nesta Helen Webster, claimed the Illuminati had been founded by Jewish conspirators as a plot for world domination, calling this cabal a synagogue of Satan that was comprised of Jews "who had literally 'Sold their souls to the devil"'.

Carr's books had an influence on American right-wing anti-communists like Robert W. Welch Jr., who used Carr's Illuminati theme in the American Opinion magazine distributed by the John Birch Society. Welch, however, was careful to remove terms like "synagogue of Satan", "Jewish influence", or "international bankers". Instead, Welch made the Illuminati a "cult of Satanism", comparing it to communism.

The Illuminati conspiracy theory was later mainstreamed into religious circles by Pat Brooks, who authored a number of anti-occult books. Brooks went beyond early modern distortions that Jewish cabalism was a form of occultism and overtly declared that the entire tradition of Judaism was a synagogue of Satan.

RiverCrest Publishing, which publishes works by Texe Marrs, published a book by Andrew Carrington Hitchcock titled "The Synagogue of Satan" in which Hitchcock combines the Khazar hypothesis of Ashkenazi ancestry, the New World Order conspiracy theory, the Illuminati conspiracy theory all as part of an international Jewish conspiracy.

=== Christian Identity ===
The 20th-century ideology of Christian Identity uses the "synagogue of Satan" of Revelation and Jesus's words in the Gospel of John to the Pharisees that they are "of their father the devil" to support their serpent seed teaching that Jews are the literal descendants of Satan. In an early version of this teaching, one Identity author published a 1944 pamphlet titled The Morning Cometh that examines the teachings of Ethel Bristowe in her work Sargon the Magnificent (1927) and concludes that Cain (Sargon) is the founder of the synagogue of Satan and the father of the Jewish race.

Doctrinally, the dual seedline teaching places Jews in conflict with the Anglo-Saxon race, a cosmic dualism of good versus evil in which Adam's seed is at war with the seed of the devil. In this teaching, Jews are not the true Israelites, and through their association with the synagogue of Satan, have deceived the Anglo-Saxons of their true identity, but failed to take away the Anglo-Saxons' covenant relationship with God as his people.

== Modern uses ==
Billy Graham used the phrase "synagogue of Satan" to refer to "one of two types of Jews" in a private 1973 White House conversation with President Richard Nixon. In the conversation, Graham said these enemies of society "have a strange brilliance about them. They're smart. And they are energized by supernatural power". When tapes of the conversation were released many years later, Graham apologized for what were deemed by many to be antisemitic remarks.

Louis Farrakhan regularly uses the term in referring to Jews as the source of the world's problems. Addressing a Nation of Islam congregation in Detroit in 2016, he said that the synagogue of Satan had "mastered civilization now, but they've mastered it in evil".

=== Christian nationalism ===
At the 2024 Republican National Convention where Christian nationalism was a strong theme, California Republican delegate Harmeet Dhillon, a Sikh, delivered the closing prayer in Punjabi which set off a firestorm of social media criticism. Gab CEO Andrew Torba commented that there can be "no tolerance for pagan false gods and the synagogue of Satan".

== See also ==
- Antisemitism and the New Testament § Book of Revelation
- Pharisees
