= Revelation 2 =

- ← chapter 1 chapter 3 →
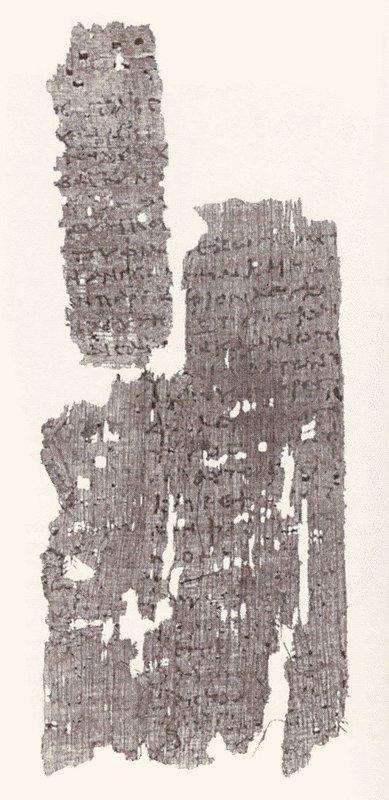
- Revelation 1:13–2:1 on the verso side of Papyrus 98 from the second century.
- Book: Book of Revelation
- Category: Apocalypse
- Christian Bible part: New Testament
- Order in the Christian part: 27

Revelation 2 is the second chapter of the Book of Revelation or the Apocalypse of John in the New Testament of the Christian Bible. The book is traditionally attributed to John the Apostle, but the precise identity of the author remains a point of academic debate. This chapter contains messages to the churches of Ephesus, Smyrna, Pergamum and Thyatira, four of the seven churches of Asia located in modern-day Turkey, with messages for the other three churches appearing in chapter 3.

== Text ==
The original text was written in Koine Greek. This chapter is divided into 29 verses.

=== Textual witnesses ===
Early manuscripts containing the text of this chapter include: (Note: The Book of Revelation is missing from Codex Vaticanus.)

- Papyrus 98 (2nd century; extant verse 1)
- Papyrus 115 (c. 275; extant verses 1–3, 13–15, 27–29)
- Codex Sinaiticus (330–360)
- Codex Alexandrinus (400–440)
- Codex Ephraemi Rescriptus (c. 450; complete)
- Papyrus 43 (6th/7th century; extant verses 12–13)

The map of West Anatolia (formerly the province of Asia) showing the island of Patmos and the location of the seven churches mentioned in the Book of Revelation.

=== Old Testament references ===
- Revelation 2:14: Numbers 25
- Revelation 2:20: 1 Kings 16:31
- Revelation 2:23: Jeremiah 11:20; Jeremiah 17:10
- Revelation 2:26–27: Psalm 2:8–9

=== New Testament references ===
- Revelation 2:26,27: Revelation 12:5; 19:15.

== The message to Ephesus (2:1–7) ==
=== Verse 1 ===
"To the angel of the church of Ephesus write,

'These things says He who holds the seven stars in His right hand, who walks in the midst of the seven golden lampstands:"

== The message to Smyrna (2:8–11) ==
=== Verse 8 ===
"And to the angel of the church in Smyrna write,

'These things says the First and the Last, who was dead, and came to life:'"

=== Verse 9 ===
"I know your works, tribulation, and poverty (but you are rich); and I know the blasphemy of those who say they are Jews and are not, but are a synagogue of Satan."

Historian Paula Fredriksen identifies this verse as an instance of intra-Jewish argument preserved in the New Testament, similar to John 8:44, and suggests that it reflects a setting during the First Jewish Revolt against Rome (66–73 AD). She read its as the author's denunciation of rival Jews whose form of Judaism he considers illegitimate, not as an outsider's attack on Judaism as such. She notes that this language would be repurposed by later gentile writers in ways far removed from its original context.

== The message to Pergamum (2:12–17) ==
=== Verse 12 ===
"And to the angel of the church in Pergamos write,

'These things says He who has the sharp two-edged sword:'"

=== Verse 14 ===
But I have a few things against you, because you have there those who hold the doctrine of Balaam, who taught Balak to put a stumbling block before the children of Israel, to eat things sacrificed to idols, and to commit sexual immorality.

The instruction Balaam gave to Balak, which is here called his "doctrine", was that Balak should get some of the most beautiful women in his kingdom to ply the men of Israel, and draw them into uncleanness, and so to idolatry; this would provoke God's anger to the Israelites, so Balak might get an advantage over them. Israelites did commit whoredom with the daughters of Moab, eat things sacrificed to idols, and bowed down to Baal Peor, is certain (Numbers 25:1); but that this was brought about through the counsel of Balaam is not so plainly expressed, though it is hinted at in Numbers 31:15; but the Jewish writers are very clear about this matter. Jonathan ben Uzziel, one of the Targumists on Numbers 24:14, has these words of Balaam,

"Come, and I will counsel thee, (speaking to Balak,) go and set up inns, and place in them whorish women, to sell food and drink at a low price: and this people will come and eat and drink, and be drunken, and will lie with them, and deny their God; and they will be quickly delivered into thine hands, and many of them shall fall.

This now was the stumbling block he taught Balak to lay before them. And elsewhere it is said,

"that Balaam, the wicked, gave counsel to Balak, the son of Zippor, to cause the Israelites to fall by the sword; he said to him, the God of this people hates whoredom, cause thy daughters to commit whoredom with them, and ye shall rule over them."

Both Philo and Josephus speak of this counsel of Balaam, much to the same purpose. The Samaritan Chronicle says that this counsel pleased the king, and he sent into the camp of Israel, on a sabbath day, 24,000 young women, by whom the Israelites were so seduced, that they did everything they desired them, which was just the number of those that were slain, Numbers 25:9.

== The message to Thyatira (2:18–29) ==
=== Verse 18 ===
"And to the angel of the church in Thyatira write,

'These things says the Son of God, who has eyes like a flame of fire, and His feet like fine brass:'"

=== Verse 20 ===
Nevertheless I have a few things against you, because you allow that woman Jezebel, who calls herself a prophetess, to teach and seduce My servants to commit sexual immorality and eat things sacrificed to idols.

The Jerusalem Bible suggests that Jezebel was a "self-styled prophetess of the Nicolaitan sect". Theologian John Gill writes:

"That woman Jezebel" – or "thy wife Jezebel", as the Complutensian edition and Syriac version read – the name of King Ahab's wife, who seduced him, in the Hebrew language is "Izebel", but is read by the Septuagint in 1 Kings 16:31, "Jezebel", as here; and by Josephus as "Jezabela"; she had her name from "Zebel", "dung", to which Elijah has reference in 2 Kings 9:37; the Ethiopic version calls her "Elzabel". She was the daughter of an Heathen, and as she was the wife of Ahab, and therefore a queen, so the "whore of Babylon" calls herself; and as Jezebel was famous for her paintings, so are her pretensions to religion and holiness, and for the gaudiness of her worship; and as she was remarkable for her idolatry, whoredoms, witchcrafts, and cruel persecution of the prophets of the Lord, and for murder, and innocent blood she shed; and as Jezebel, who stirred up Ahab against good and faithful men, so Babylon the great, the mother of harlots, shall be cast into the sea, and be found no more at all: compare 2 Kings 9:7 with Revelation 17:1.

== See also ==
- Acts of Apostles
- Balaam
- Balak
- Jesus Christ
- Jezebel
- John's vision of the Son of Man
- John the Apostle
- Seven churches of Asia
- Related Bible parts: Numbers 22, Numbers 24, Numbers 25, Numbers 31, 1 Kings 16, 1 Kings 21, 2 Kings 9, Psalm 2, 2 Peter 2, Revelation 1, Revelation 3, Revelation 17
- Synagogue of Satan

== Bibliography ==
- Bauckham, Richard (2007). "81. Revelation". In Barton, John; Muddiman, John (eds.). The Oxford Bible Commentary (first (paperback) ed.). Oxford University Press. pp. 1287–1306. ISBN 978-0199277186.
