= Seven Spirits =

Seven Spirits may refer to:

- The seven spirits of God referred to in the New Testament Book of Revelation
- The Seven Spirits album performed by Eidolon (band)
