= Revelation 5 =

- ← chapter 4 chapter 6 →
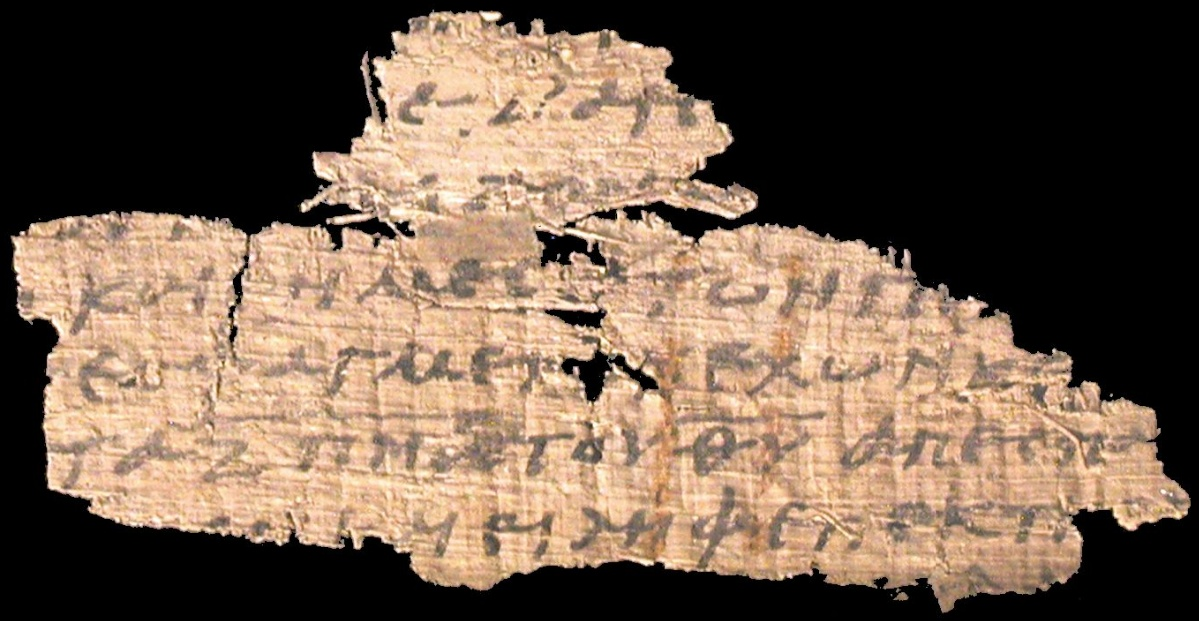
- Revelation 5:5-8 on the recto side of Papyrus 24 from the 4th century.
- Book: Book of Revelation
- Category: Apocalypse
- Christian Bible part: New Testament
- Order in the Christian part: 27

Revelation 5 is the fifth chapter of the Book of Revelation or the Apocalypse of John in the New Testament of the Christian Bible. The book is traditionally attributed to John the Apostle, but the precise identity of the author remains a point of academic debate. This chapter contains the inaugural vision of the lamb on the throne in heaven.

== Text ==
The original text was written in Koine Greek. This chapter is divided into 14 verses.

=== Textual witnesses ===
Some early manuscripts containing the text of this chapter are among others: (Note: The Book of Revelation is missing from Codex Vaticanus.)

- Papyrus 115 (ca. AD 275; extant verses 8–9)
- Codex Sinaiticus (330-360)
- Codex Alexandrinus (400-440)

=== Old Testament references ===
- Revelation 5:5: Genesis 49:9

== Verse 1 ==
I saw in the Right hand of Him(Jesus Christ) who sat on the throne a scroll written inside and on the back, sealed with seven seals.

The sealed scroll or book (Biblical Greek: βιβλιον, romanized: biblion) is introduced, which will be unsealed step by step in chapter 6 and finally opened with the breach of the seventh seal in Revelation 8:1. "The idea of the book in which the decrees of the Divine government appear written occurs already in Psalm 139:16 and in Exodus 32:32". Only Jesus, the Lamb is proven worthy to open the scroll which contains 'God's secret plan for the coming of his kingdom on earth'.

== Verse 5 ==
But one of the elders said to me, "Do not weep. Behold, the Lion of the tribe of Judah, the Root of David, has prevailed to open the scroll and to loose its seven seals."

Cross reference: Isaiah 11:10

== Verse 6 ==
And I looked, and behold, in the midst of the throne and of the four living creatures, and in the midst of the elders, stood a Lamb as though it had been slain, having seven horns and seven eyes, which are the seven Spirits of God sent out into all the earth.

The Lamb appeared to be Slain Look the Lamb of God that takes away the sins of the Cosmos/World..John 1:29

Was wounded by US to forever wear those scars…Zec 13:6

The seven Horns Reflecting the perfection of Power He had/has…Lam 2:3

The seven Eyes The perfection of the spiritual eyesight/wisdom of our Lord who is the ONLY ONE that can loose the seals because He gained victory for US and the Spirit of God was upon Him…Luke 4:18

== Verse 11 ==
Then I looked, and I heard the voice of many angels around the throne, the living creatures, and the elders; and the number of them was ten thousand times ten thousand, and thousands of thousands,

== Verse 12 ==
New King James Version

saying with a loud voice:

“Worthy is the Lamb who was slain
To receive power and riches and wisdom,
And strength and honor and glory and blessing!”

== Verse 13 ==
New King James Version

And every creature which is in heaven and on the earth and under the earth and such as are in the sea, and all that are in them, I heard saying:

“Blessing and honor and glory and power
Be to Him who sits on the throne,
And to the Lamb, forever and ever!”

== Verse 14 ==
New King James Version

Then the four living creatures said, “Amen!” And the twenty-four elders fell down and worshiped Him who lives forever and ever.

== Uses ==
=== Music ===
The King James Version of verses 9 and 12–14 from this chapter is cited as texts in the English-language oratorio "Messiah" by George Frideric Handel (HWV 56).

== See also ==
- 7 Horns 7 Eyes
- David
- Jesus Christ
- John's vision of the Son of Man
- Judah (biblical person)
- Names and titles of Jesus in the New Testament
- Tetramorph
- Related Bible parts: Isaiah 11, Revelation 4, Revelation 6, Revelation 22

== Bibliography ==
- Bauckham, Richard (2007). "81. Revelation". In Barton, John; Muddiman, John (eds.). The Oxford Bible Commentary (first (paperback) ed.). Oxford University Press. pp. 1287–1306. ISBN 978-0-19-927718-6.
