= Revelation 19 =

- ← chapter 18 chapter 20 →
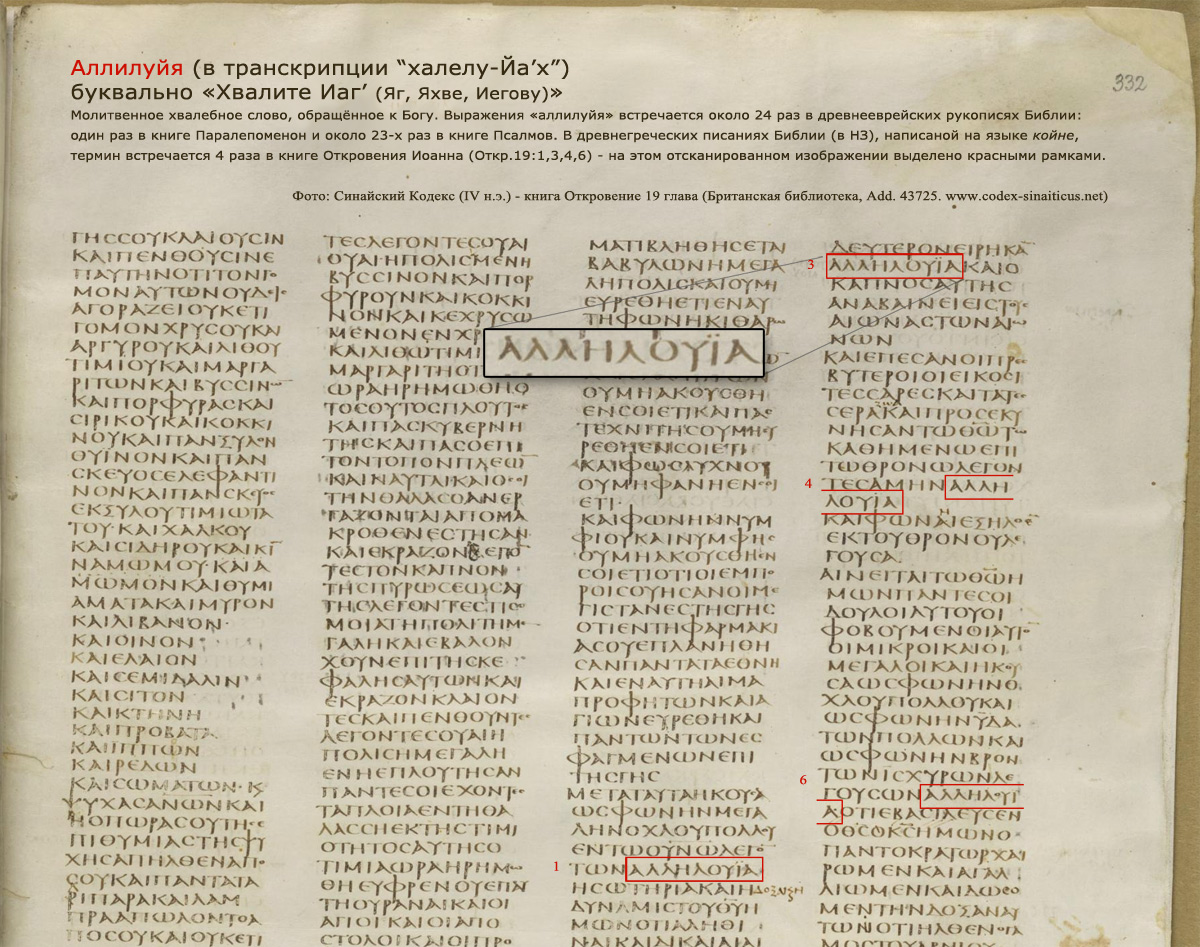
- The Greek text of Revelation 19 in Codex Sinaiticus (British Library, Add. 43725; from 4th century AD). The term "hallelujah" (in Greek majuscule: ἈΛΛΗΛΟΎΪΑ) occurs 4 times in this chapter (Revelation 19:1,3,4,6) as highlighted in red frames.
- Book: Book of Revelation
- Category: Apocalypse
- Christian Bible part: New Testament
- Order in the Christian part: 27

Revelation 19 is the nineteenth chapter of the Book of Revelation or the Apocalypse of John in the New Testament of the Christian Bible. The book is traditionally attributed to John the Apostle, but the precise identity of the author remains a point of academic debate. In this chapter, heaven exults over the fall of Babylon the Great.

== Text ==
The original text was written in Koine Greek. This chapter is divided into 21 verses.

=== Textual witnesses ===
Some early manuscripts containing the text of this chapter are: (Note: The Book of Revelation is missing from Codex Vaticanus.)

- Codex Sinaiticus (330-360)
- Codex Alexandrinus (400-440)
- Codex Ephraemi Rescriptus (ca. 450; extant verses 1-4)

=== Old Testament references ===
- Revelation 19:15: Psalm 2:8–9

=== New Testament references ===
- Revelation 19:9: Matthew 22:1
- Revelation 19:10: Revelation 22:9
- Revelation 19:15: Revelation 2:26,27; 12:5
- Revelation 19:16: Revelation 17:14

== Structure ==
In the Jerusalem Bible, verses 1 to 10 conclude the section in chapters 17 and 18 dealing with the Punishment of Babylon, and verses 11 to 21 concern "the first battle of the End".

== The Fall of Babylon (19:1–8) ==
=== Verse 1 ===
After these things I heard a loud voice of a great multitude in heaven, saying, "Alleluia! Salvation and glory and honor and power belong to the Lord our God!"

A 'full range of voices in heaven' give praise to God for his judgment of Babylon.

== John and the Angel (19:9–10) ==
=== Verse 9 ===
Then he said to me, "Write: 'Blessed are those who are called to the marriage supper of the Lamb!'" And he said to me, "These are the true sayings of God."

In place of "he said", many English translations infer that the speaker is an angel, because in verse 10 he forgoes being worshipped and calls himself "your fellow servant, and [the fellow servant] of your brethren who have the testimony of Jesus". The Cambridge Bible for Schools and Colleges assumes that this angel and the one who came forward in Revelation 17:1 are the same.

== The Rider from Heaven and his Victory (19:11–21) ==
=== Verse 11 ===
Now I saw heaven opened, and behold, a white horse.

According to the Jerusalem Bible, the white horse symbolises victory. According to Methodist writer Joseph Benson, it was "intended to denote [Jesus'] justice and holiness, and also that victory and triumph should mark his progress". The horse may be contrasted with the colt or ass on which Jesus rode into Jerusalem (Matthew 21:1–7 etc.) and the biblical prophecy underpinning the gospel accounts (Zechariah 9:9). The ass is for peace, but the horse was used for war.

=== Verse 12 ===
His eyes were like flames of fire, and on his head were many crowns. A name was written on him that no one understood except himself.

=== Verse 13 ===
He was clothed with a robe dipped in blood, and His name is called The Word of God.

The person of Jesus, as the truth and the one who has 'supremely witnessed to the truth of God in his life and his death', comes to earth and is the Word of God in person.

=== Verse 15 ===
Now out of His mouth goes a sharp sword, that with it He should strike the nations. And He Himself will rule them with a rod of iron. He Himself treads the winepress of the fierceness and wrath of Almighty God.

- "Sharp" or "sharp two-edged".

== Uses ==
=== Literature ===
M. R. James' 1904 short story "The Treasure of Abbot Thomas" quotes from Revelation 19:16 and 19:12 to give the text "They have on their raiment a writing which no man knoweth": a clue to the hidden location of the titular treasure.

=== Music ===
The King James Version of verse 6 from this chapter is cited as texts in the English-language oratorio "Messiah" by George Frideric Handel (HWV 56).

== See also ==
- Book of Daniel
- Jesus Christ
- John's vision of the Son of Man
- Names and titles of Jesus in the New Testament
- Whore of Babylon
- Related Bible parts: Revelation 4, Revelation 7, Revelation 13, Revelation 18

== Bibliography ==
- Bauckham, Richard (2007). "81. Revelation". In Barton, John; Muddiman, John (eds.). The Oxford Bible Commentary (first (paperback) ed.). Oxford University Press. pp. 1287–1306. ISBN 978-0199277186.
