= Dittography =

Accidental repeating of content in text

Dittography is the accidental, erroneous act of repeating a letter, word, phrase or combination of letters by a scribe or copyist. The term is used in the field of textual criticism, especially in critical studies of ancient or biblical literature. The opposite phenomenon, in which a copyist omits text by skipping from a word or phrase to a similar word or phrase further on, is known as haplography.

== Example ==
Papyrus 98 in Rev 1:13 has περιεζωσμμενον instead of περιεζωσμενον (doubled μ). The Codex Vaticanus repeats the word διδασκαλος in John 13:14. The phrase "Great is Artemis of the Ephesians" appears twice in Acts 19:34 in the Codex Vaticanus, while it only appears once in other manuscripts.
