= Papyrus 18 =

Papyrus 𝔓^{18}
- New Testament manuscript
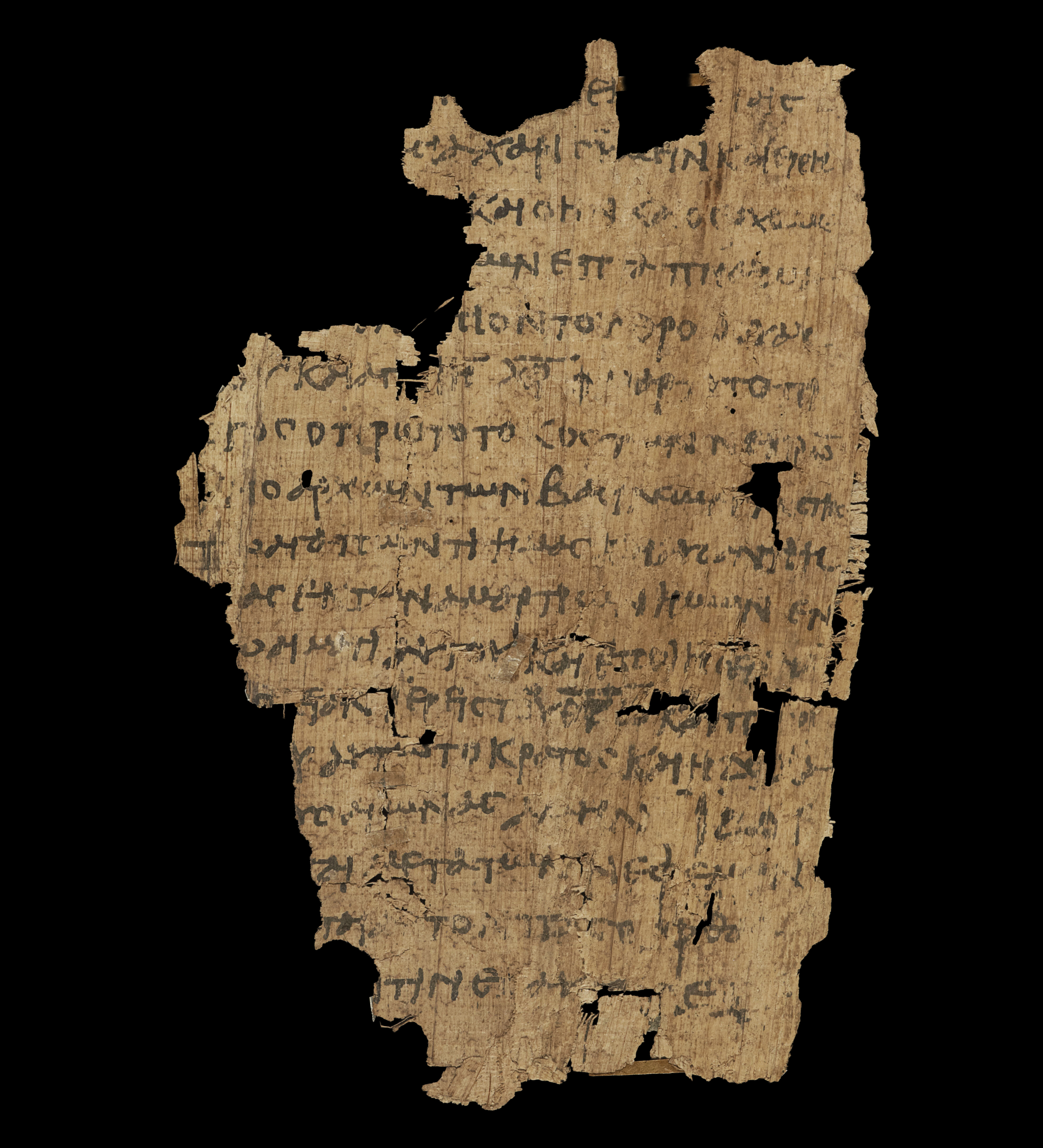
- Verso Revelation 1:4–7
- Name: Oxyrhynchus Papyri 1079
- Text: Book of Revelation 1 †
- Date: 3rd/4th century
- Script: Greek
- Found: Egypt
- Now at: British Library
- Cite: B. P. Grenfell & A. S. Hunt, Oxyrhynchus Papyri VIII, (London 1911), pp. 13 14
- Type: Alexandrian text-type
- Category: I

Papyrus 18 (in the Gregory–Aland numbering), designated by 𝔓^{18}, is an early copy of the New Testament in Greek. It is a papyrus manuscript containing the beginning of the Book of Revelation. It contains only Revelation 1:4–7. It is written against the fibres of the papyrus. On the other side of the papyrus is the ending of the book of Exodus. It is unclear whether the papyrus was a scroll of Exodus later reused for a copy of Revelation or a leaf from a codex with miscellaneous contents. The two sides of the papyrus were copied in different hands, but the original editor of the papyrus did not think there was a great interval of time between the copying of the two sides. He assigned the Exodus to the third century and the Revelation to the third or early fourth century.

== Description ==
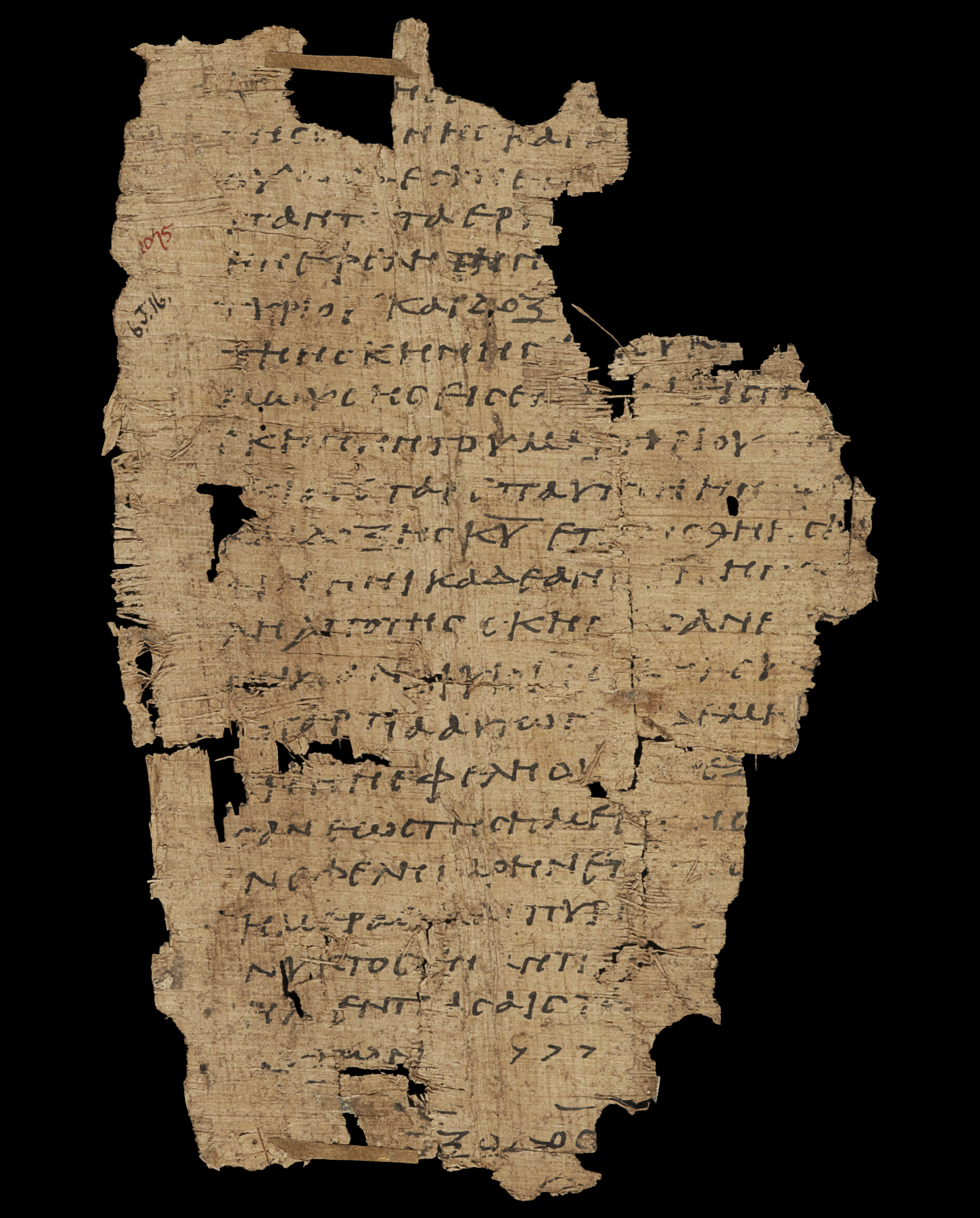
Recto Exodus 40, 26–38

The Greek text of this manuscript is a representative of the Alexandrian text-type. Aland placed it in Category I.

- Revelation 1:5

λυσαντι ημας εκ (lysanti hēmas ek) — P^{18}, א^{c}, A, C, 2020, 2081, 2814
λουσαντι ημας απο (lousanti hēmas apo) — P, 046, 94, 1006, 1859, 2042, 2065, 2073, 2138, 2432

It is currently housed at the British Library (Inv. 2053v) in London.

== Text ==
Original Greek:
[Ιωαννης τα]ι[ς επτα] εκ[λησ]ιαις
[ταις εν τη] Ασια χαρις υμειν και ειρη
[νη απο ο ων] και ο ην και ο ερχομε
[νος και απο τ[ων επτα πνευμα
[των α] εν[ω]πιον του θρονου αυ
[τ]ου και απο Ι̅Η̅ Χ̅Ρ̅ ο μαρτυς ο πι
στος ο πρωτοτοκος των νεκρω
και ο αρχων των βασιλεων της γης
τω αγαπωντι ημας και λυσαντι η
[μ]ας εκ των αμαρτιων ημων εν
[τ]ω αιματι αυτου και εποιησεν ημ[ας]
[βα]σ[ιλ]ειαν ιερεις του θ̅υ̅^{a} και π[α]τρι
[αυτο]υ. αυτω το κρατος και η δοξα
[εις το]υς αιωνας αμην ιδου
[ερχε]ται μετα των νεφελων
[και οψε]ται αυτον πας οφθαλ
[μος και ο]ιτινες αυτον εξε[κεντησαν]

Romanization:
[Iōannēs ta]i[s hepta] ek[lēs]iais
[tais en tē] Asia charis hymein kai eirē
[nē apo ho ōn] kai ho ēn kai ho erchome
[nos kai apo t[ōn hepta pneuma
[tōn a] en[ō]pion tou thronou au
[t]ou kai apo I̅Ē̅ C̅h̅R̅ ho martys ho pi
stos ho prōtotokos tōn nekrō
kai ho archōn tōn basileōn tēs gēs
tō agapōnti hēmas kai lysanti hē
[m]as ek tōn hamartiōn hēmōn en
[t]ō aimati autou kai epoiēsen hēm[as]
[ba]s[il]eian hiereis tou t̅h̅u̅ kai p[a]tri
[auto]u. autō to kratos kai hē doxa
[eis to]us aiōnas amēn idou
[erche]tai meta tōn nephelōn
[kai opse]tai auton pas ophthal
[mos kai ho]itines auton exe[kentēsan]

Translation (NIV):
John, To the seven churches
in the province of Asia: Grace and peace
to you from him who is, and who was, and who is to come,
and from the seven spirits
before his throne,
and from Jesus Christ, who is the faithful witness,
the firstborn from the dead,
and the ruler of the kings of the earth.
To him who loves us and has freed us
from our sins by his blood,
and has made us to be a
kingdom and priests to serve his God and Father—
to him be glory and power
for ever and ever! Amen. “Look,
he is coming with the clouds,”
and “every eye will see him,
even those who pierced him”

^{a} The scribe corrected this to τω θ̅ω̅

== See also ==
- List of New Testament papyri
- Revelation 1
