= Uncial 0169 =

- New Testament manuscript
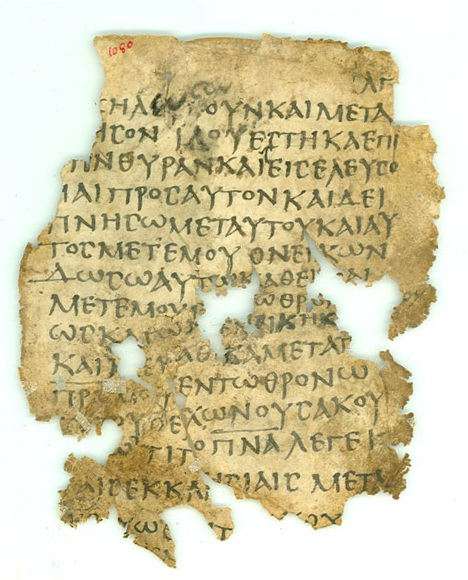
- Name: P. Oxy. 1080
- Text: Revelation 3:19-4:3
- Date: 4th century
- Script: Greek
- Found: Oxyrhynchus
- Now at: Princeton Theological Seminary
- Size: 9.3 cm × 7.7 cm (3.7 in × 3.0 in)
- Type: Alexandrian text-type
- Category: III

Uncial 0169 (in the Gregory-Aland numbering), known also as the Princeton fragment, is a Greek uncial manuscript of the New Testament, dated palaeographically to the 4th century.

== Description ==
The codex contains a small parts of the Book of Revelation 3:19-4:3, on an almost complete parchment leaf (9.3 by 7.7 cm (3.7 by 3.0 in)). It is written in one column per page, 14 lines per page, in small uncial letters. The hand of the codex is a fair-sized upright uncial, fairly regular.

The letter sigma was formed with two strokes of the pen, and epsilon with three strokes; the letters kappa and upsilon have serifs.

The two pages are numbered in the outside upper corner 33 and 34. The nomina sacra are written in abbreviated forms, but some of the usual contractions are written in length forms (e.g. ουρανω).

== Text ==
The Greek text of this codex is a representative of the Alexandrian text-type. Aland placed it in Category III. According to R. H. Charles the text is "much more closely with Codex Sinaiticus than with any other uncial". The text seems to be inaccurately copied.

Currently it is dated by the INTF to the 4th century.

The text was edited in 1911 by Grenfell and Hunt.

The codex currently is housed at the Princeton Theological Seminary (Speer Library, Pap. 5) in Princeton.

== See also ==
- List of New Testament uncials
- Textual criticism
- Related Bible parts: Revelation 3, Revelation 4
