= Revelation 4 =

- ← chapter 3 chapter 5 →
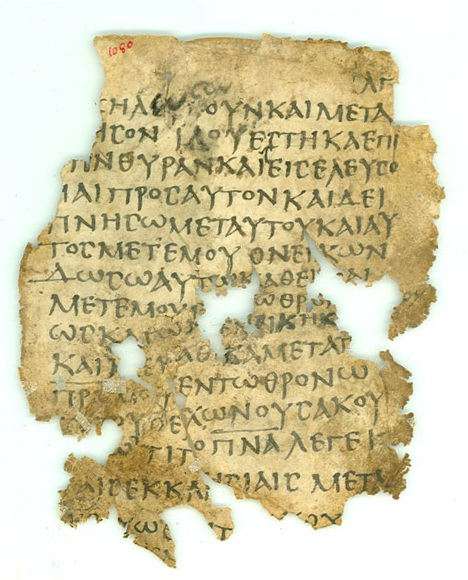
- Revelation 3:19-4:3 on Uncial 0169 from the fourth century.
- Book: Book of Revelation
- Category: Apocalypse
- Christian Bible part: New Testament
- Order in the Christian part: 27

Revelation 4 is the fourth chapter of the Book of Revelation or the Apocalypse of John in the New Testament of the Christian Bible. The book is traditionally attributed to John the Apostle, but the precise identity of the author remains a point of academic debate. This chapter contains an inaugural vision of heaven, portraying the throne room of heaven, and the heavenly worship which the writer observes there. The throne visions and apocalyptic imagery is believed to draw upon Enochian literature such as 1 Enoch 14, which was combined with Ezekiel 1, Isaiah 6, and Daniel 7. The chapter can be considered mystical, being linked to early Jewish Merkavah mysticism.

== Text ==
The original text was written in Koine Greek. This chapter is divided into 11 verses.

=== Textual witnesses ===
Some early manuscripts containing the text of this chapter are among others: (Note: The Book of Revelation is missing from Codex Vaticanus.)

- Codex Sinaiticus (330-360)
- Uncial 0169 (4th century; extant verses 1–3)
- Codex Alexandrinus (400-440)

=== Old Testament references ===
- Revelation 4:8: Isaiah 6:3

== God on the Throne ==
God's sovereignty over all things is symbolized by the throne, which visions are found both in the Hebrew Bible/Old Testament prophetic tradition (cf. 1 Kings 22:19—23) as well as in some Jewish apocalypses, and in this chapter (echoing Isaiah 6 and Ezekiel 1) is seen as "already fully acknowledged in heaven, and therefore as the true reality which must in the end prevail on earth". Taken up into heaven, John can see that "God's throne is the ultimate reality behind all earthly appearances".

== Verse 1 ==
After these things I looked, and behold, a door standing open in heaven.
And the first voice which I heard was like a trumpet speaking with me, saying, "Come up here, and I will show you things which must take place after this."

"After these things" refers back to "the entire vision in Revelation 1:10 to Revelation 3:22".

== Verse 8 ==
The four living creatures, each having six wings, were full of eyes around and within. And they do not rest day or night, saying:

“Holy, holy, holy,
Lord God Almighty,
Who was and is and is to come!”

- "Four living creatures": reflecting a combination of the cherubim in Ezekiel 1 and seraphim in Isaiah 6:2, they function as 'the priests of heavenly temple'. Their song is an adaption of Isaiah 6:3 with the incorporation of 'two of the key designations of God' (cf. Revelation 1:4, 8).

== Verse 11 ==
"You are worthy, O Lord,
To receive glory and honor and power;
For You created all things,
And by Your will they exist and were created."

The depiction of God's sovereignty starts with him as the 'Creator of all things', then as 'Redeemer' to restore his universal sovereignty on earth (Revelation 5), with the expectation to renew his whole creation in the end (Revelation 21:5).

== See also ==
- Book of Daniel
- Holy, Holy, Holy! Lord God Almighty, 19th-century English Christian hymn
- John the Apostle
- John's vision of the Son of Man
- Revelation Song
- Tetramorph
- Related Bible parts: Isaiah 6, Ezekiel 1, Revelation 5, Revelation 6

== Bibliography ==
- Bauckham, Richard (2007). "81. Revelation". In Barton, John; Muddiman, John (eds.). The Oxford Bible Commentary (first (paperback) ed.). Oxford University Press. pp. 1287–1306. ISBN 978-0199277186.
