= Seven Spirits of God =

Term in the Christian Bible

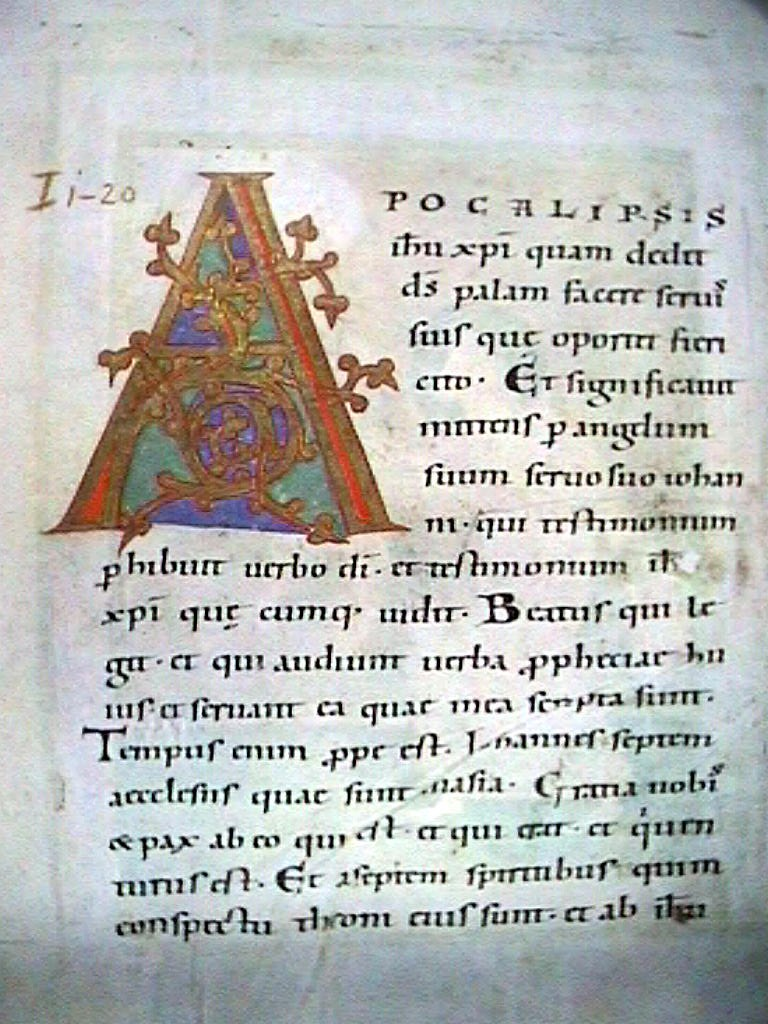
The Book of Revelation 1:1–4 (with the reference to the Seven Spirits) from the Bamberg Apocalypse, 11th century

In the Bible, the term Seven Spirits of God appears four times in the Book of Revelation. The meaning of this term has been interpreted in multiple ways.

== Biblical references ==
The seven Spirits of God (Greek: τα ἑπτά πνεύματα του θεού, ta heptá pneúmata tou theoú) are mentioned four times in the Book of Revelation, and in the Book of Isaiah it names each Spirit.

Revelation 1:4: John to the seven churches which are in Asia: Grace be unto you, and peace, from him which is, and which was, and which is to come; and from the seven Spirits which are before his throne;

Revelation 3:1: And unto the angel of the church in Sardis write; These things saith he that hath the seven Spirits of God, and the seven stars; I know thy works, that thou hast a name that thou livest, and art dead.

Revelation 4:5: And out of the throne proceeded lightnings and thunderings and voices: and there were seven lamps of fire burning before the throne, which are the seven Spirits of God.

Revelation 5:6: And I beheld, and, lo, in the midst of the throne and of the four beasts, and in the midst of the elders, stood a Lamb as it had been slain, having seven horns and seven eyes, which are the seven Spirits of God sent forth into all the earth.

== Interpretations ==
=== The sevenfold ministry of the Spirit ===
In one interpretation, the "Seven Spirits" represent the sevenfold ministry of the Spirit as depicted in the Book of Isaiah. As it is written: "The Spirit of the LORD shall rest upon him, the Spirit of wisdom and understanding, the Spirit of counsel and might, the Spirit of knowledge and of the fear of the LORD, and He will delight in the fear of the Lord." Isaiah 11:2–3 (NASB). Including the Spirit of the Lord, and the Spirits of wisdom, of understanding, of counsel, of might, of knowledge and of fear of the LORD, here are represented the seven Spirits, which are before the throne of God. The reference to the lamb in Revelation 5:6 relates it to the Seven Spirits which first appear in Revelation 1:4 and are associated with Jesus who holds them along with seven stars.

An alternative view is that the seven graces ("charisma") of Romans 12:6–8 reflect the seven spirits of God. The Holy Spirit manifests in humankind through these graces, reflecting the seven spirits of God. The seven graces are: 1. insight (prophecy); 2. helpfulness (service or ministry); 3. instruction (teaching); 4. encouragement; 5. generosity (giving); 6. guidance (leadership); and 7. compassion. This agrees with Isaiah 11:2–3 if "The Spirit of the Lord" is recognized as categorical and the delight in the fear of the Lord is added.

=== Seven distinct spiritual beings ===
In the New Testament, the Greek term dunamis (translated by some as 'power') suggests a class of exalted spiritual beings; perhaps parallel to the "chief Princes" (sar rishown) in the Old Testament, of which the Archangel Michael is stated to be one (Daniel 10:13). Dunamis is used by the Apostle Paul to refer to spiritual beings in Romans 8:38; Ephesians 1:21, 3:10, 6:12; and Colossians 1:16, 2:10, 2:15. Powers and principalities can apply to both angelic and devilish beings, but more often in the New Testament to devilish beings. However, most modern Protestant translators take dunamis to mean 'strength, power, ability', whereas the ancient and modern Catholic conception of activity or power was often understood as virtues.

Others follow this line of thought, though find the connection to dunamis referred to by Paul less likely. It is possible that these seven angels are a special entourage charged with special duties by the Lamb, about whom there is little to no specific knowledge.

Still others look to the apocryphal work 1 Enoch which refers to seven angels who are "watching" creation: Uriel, Raphael, Raguel, Michael, Sarakiel/Suriel (in 9.1), Gabriel, and Phanuel, who is mentioned as one of the four chief angels in 40.9.

=== Symbolic of perfection ===
Sevenfold may also be connected with the biblical understanding of the number 7 representing perfection. The "Seven Fold Spirit of God" could be the "perfect" Spirit of God, the Holy Spirit.

== See also ==
- Christian eschatology
- Holy Spirit (Christianity)
- Seven Archangels
- Seven Churches of Asia
- Water of Life (Christianity)
- Amesha Spentas
