= Papyrus 98 =

- New Testament manuscript
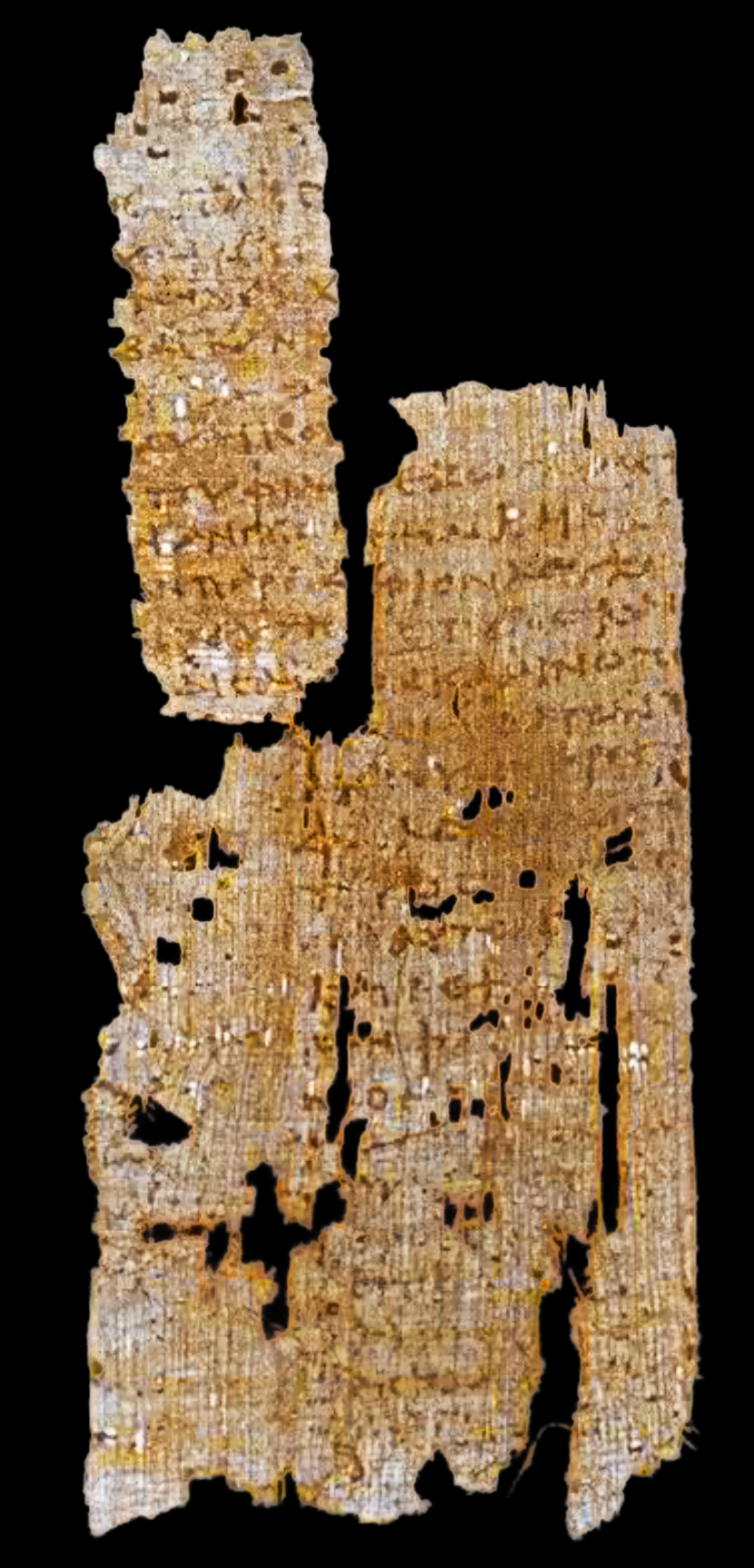
- Revelation 1:13–2:1
- Name: P. IFAO inv. 237b [+a]
- Sign: 𝔓^{98}
- Text: Book of Revelation 1:13–2:1
- Date: c. 150-175
- Script: Greek
- Found: 1971
- Now at: French Institute of Oriental Archeology
- Size: 15 cm × 16 cm
- Type: Alexandrian Text-Type
- Note: in bad condition

Papyrus 98 (in the Gregory–Aland numbering), designated by 𝔓^{98}, is an early copy of the New Testament in Greek. It is a papyrus manuscript of the Book of Revelation. The manuscript palaeographically had been assigned to years around 150–250.

== Description ==
The surviving text of Revelation includes verses 1:13–2:1 in a fragmentary condition. The script is well-formed and large. It was formed in a scroll. The biblical text is on the side verso. On the recto is another documentary text dated to the end of the 1st century or the beginning of the 2nd century. Side verso of the scroll was used for the biblical text at the end of the 2nd century.

It has an error of dittography in the first line – περι̣εζωσμμ̣εν̣ον instead of περιεζωσμενον.

== Text ==
It is still not placed in any of Aland's Categories of New Testament manuscripts. "The text shows several differences from that printed in Nestle–Aland 27th".

[Recto]

περ]ι̣εζωσμμ̣εν̣[ον προς τοις μαστοις ζωνην
χρυ]σεν ^{[1:14]} και η κ̣ε[φαλη αυτου και αι τριχες λευκαι
ως] εριον λευκον [ως χιων και οι οφθαλμοι αυτου ως
φλ]οξ πυρος ^{[1:15]} και [οι ποδες αυτου ομοιοι χαλκολιβανω
ως] εν καμινω πε[πυρωμενης και η φωνη αυτου ως
φωνη υδατων π̣[ολλων ^{[1:16]} και εχων εν τη δεξια χειρι
αυτου αστερες [ζ̅ και εκ του στοματος αυτου ρομ
φαια διστομος ο[ξεια εκπορευομενη και η οψις αυ
το̣υ ως ο η̣λ̣ιος φ[αινει εν τη δυναμει αυτου ^{[1:17]} και οτε ει
δ̣ο̣ν̣ αυτον ε[π]εσα [προς τους ποδας αυτου ως νεκρος
και εθηκε̣ τ̣η̣ν̣ [δεξιαν αυτου επ εμε λεγων
μη φοβ̣[ο]υ̣ ε̣γ̣ω̣ [ειμι ο πρωτος και ο εσχατος ^{[1:18]} και εγε
νομεν̣ ν̣εκ̣ρ̣ο̣[ς και ιδου ζων ειμι εις τους αιωνας
τ̣ω̣ν̣ α̣ι̣ω̣ν̣ω̣ν̣ [και εχω τας κλεις του θανατου και
του α̣δ̣ο̣υ̣ ^{[1:19]} γ̣ρ̣α̣ψ̣ο̣ν̣ [ουν α ειδες και α εισιν και α μελλει
γε̣ν̣ε̣[σ]θ̣α̣ι̣ [μετα ταυτα ^{[1:20]} το μυστηριον των ζ̅
α̣στερ̣ω̣ν̣ [ους ειδες επι της δεξιας μου και τας
ζ̅ λυχνει[α]ς [τας χρυσας οι ζ̅ αστερες αγγελοι των
ζ̅ εκκλησ̣ι̣ω̣ν̣ ε̣ι[σιν και αι λυχνιαι αι ζ̅ ζ̅ εκκλεσιαι
εισ]ι̣[ν ^{[2:1]} τω αγγελω της εν εφεσω εκκλησιας γραψον ταδε λεγ
ε̣ι̣ [ο κρατων τους ζ̅ αστερας εν τη δεξια αυτου ο

In Rev 1:18 it lacks the phrase και ο ζων as Latin Codex Gigas and some manuscripts of Vulgate. It is the only Greek manuscript not containing this phrase.

== History ==
The manuscript was probably written in Egypt.

The first publisher was Wagner in 1971, who did not know that it was a biblical text. Hagedorn discovered that it was the text of Rev. 1:13–2:1.

Present location

The manuscript is currently housed at the Institut Français d'Archéologie Orientale (P. IFAO inv. 237b [+a]) at Cairo.

== See also ==
- List of New Testament papyri

== Image ==
- Image from 𝔓^{98}
