= John's vision of the Son of Man =

Episode in the Book of Revelation

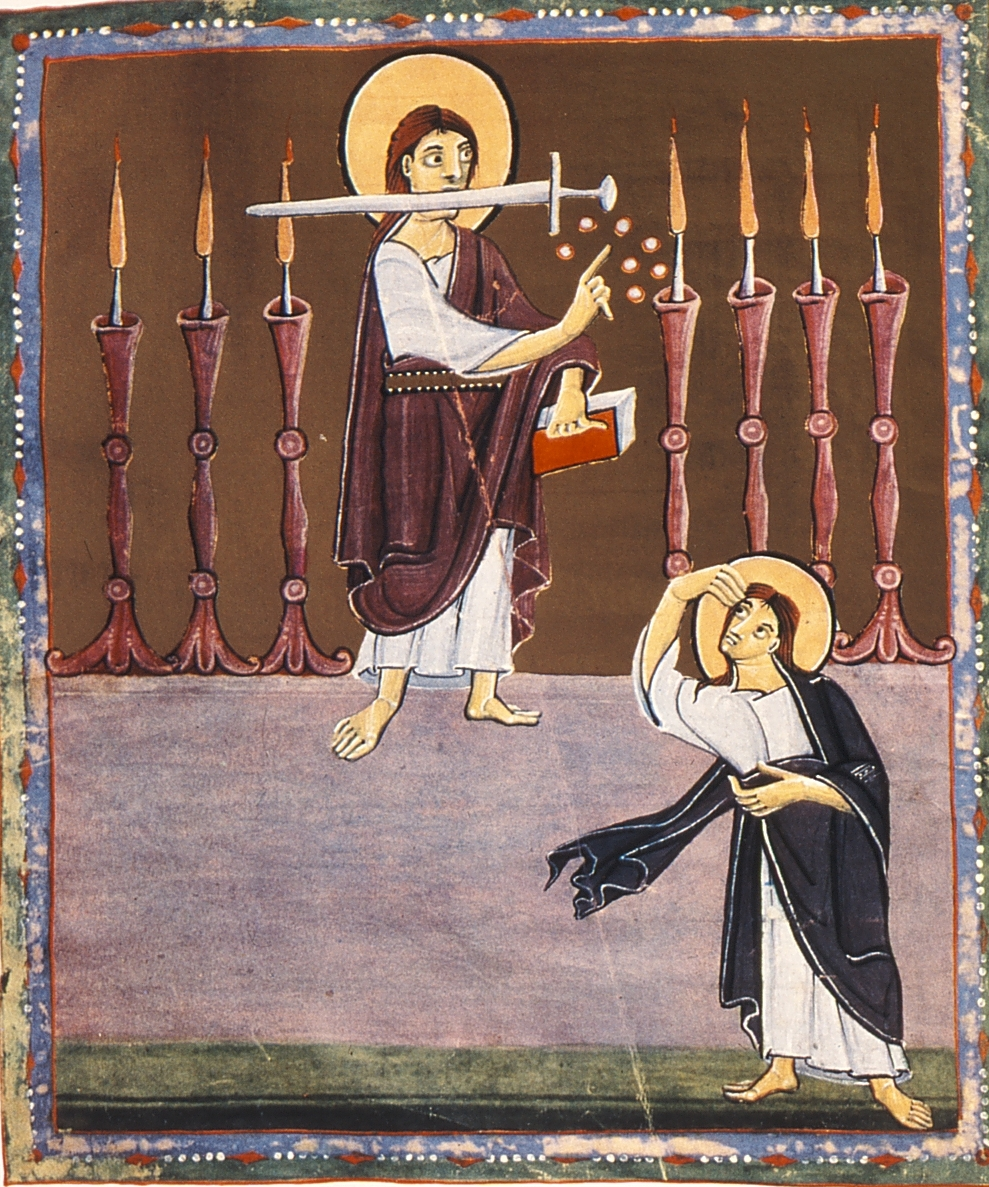
Illustration from the Bamberg Apocalypse of the Son of Man among the seven lampstands

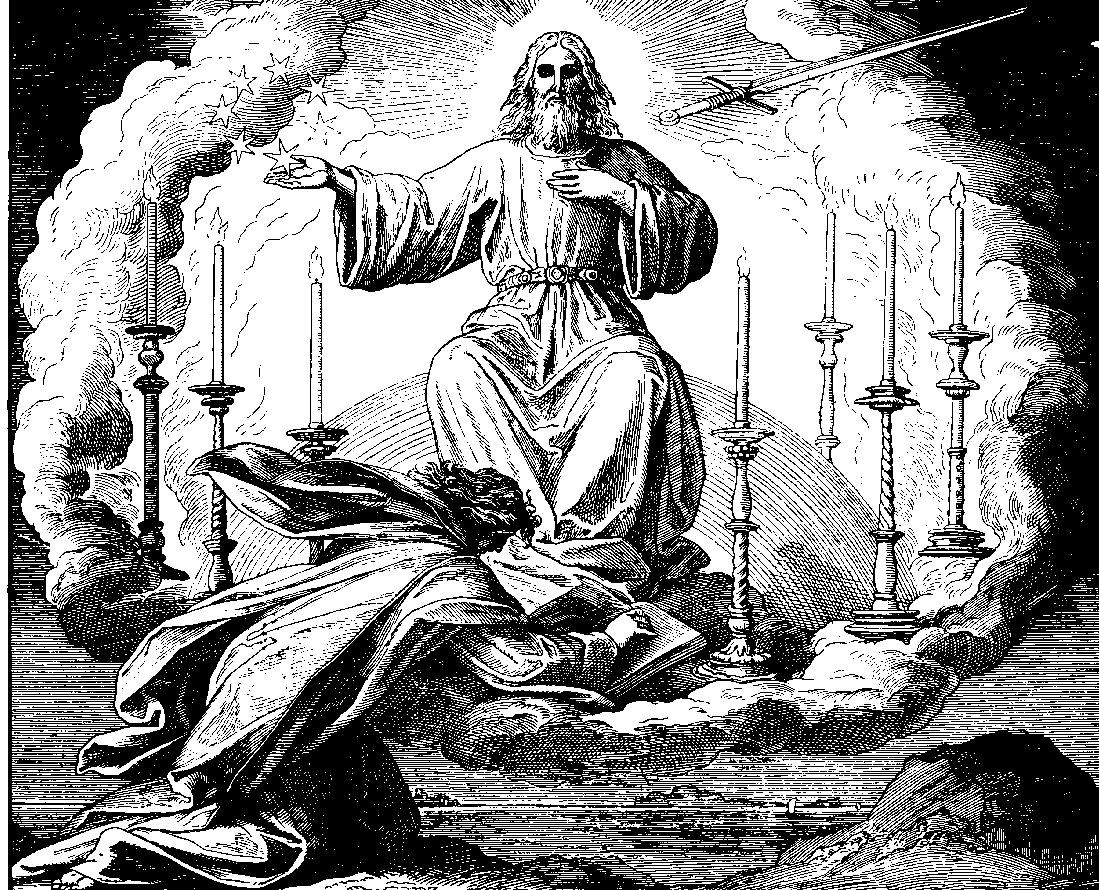
The Vision of John on Patmos by Julius Schnorr von Carolsfeld (1860)

John's vision of the Son of Man, also known as John’s Vision of Christ, is a vision described in the Book of Revelation (Revelation 1:9–20) in which the author, identified as John, sees a person he describes as one "like the Son of Man" (verse 13). The Son of Man is portrayed in this vision as having a robe with a golden sash, the hair on his head was white like wool, as white as snow, and his eyes were like blazing fire. His feet were like bronze glowing in a furnace, and his voice was like the sound of rushing waters. He holds seven stars in his right hand and has a double-edged sword coming out of his mouth. The vision has the only known description of the Son of Man in terms of identifiable physical characteristics in any form in the Christian biblical canon.

== Account ==
John of Patmos, the author of the Book of Revelation, wrote how on the Lord's Day he was "in the Spirit", and heard a loud voice "like a trumpet" (Revelation 1:10). When he turned around, he saw this Son of Man figure. In Revelation 1:18, the figure identifies himself as "the First and the Last", who "was dead, and behold I am alive for ever and ever", a reference to the resurrection of Jesus.

== Connection with the rest of the book ==
Some of the language used in Revelation 1 is also used in Revelation 19 to describe the Rider on the White Horse. In both places, he has a sword coming out of his mouth (1:16 and 19:15) and has "eyes like blazing fire" (1:14 and 19:12). The sword proceeding from Jesus’ mouth describes the counterintuitive way God's messiah conquers: by the word of God.

The Son of Man is portrayed as walking (2:1) among seven lampstands, which represent the seven churches of Asia (1:20). In Revelation 1:11, he says, "Write on a scroll what you see and send it to the seven churches". Chapters 2 and 3 report the content of the letters written to the angels of the seven churches. Throughout the letters he is identified in terms of the vision, such as "him who has the sharp, double-edged sword" (Revelation 2:12).

== Allusion to Daniel's final vision ==
Revelation 1	Daniel 10
1:13 one like a son of man, wearing an ankle-length robe, with a gold sash around his chest	10:5 a man dressed in linen with a belt of fine gold around his waist
1:14 his eyes were like a fiery flame	10:6 his eyes were like fiery torches
1:15 His feet were like polished brass refined in a furnace	10:6 his arms and feet looked like burnished bronze
1:15 his voice was like the sound of rushing water	10:6 the sound of his voice was like the roar of a multitude
1:16 his face shone like the sun at its brightest	10:6 his face shone like lightning

There is a striking resemblance between John's and Daniel's visions of a son of man. In John's vision the Son of Man has white hair, a sword, and lampstands. In Daniel's vision the Son of Man has a body resembling tarshish, which Rabbi Rashi explains – quoting Tractate Hullin 9lb – as the man being as large as the Tarshish Sea in Africa. Rashi interprets Daniel's Son of Man to be the archangel Gabriel.

In Jewish mysticism, the angels are the heavenly priests of God who serve in his heavenly temple in his heavenly Jerusalem; hence Gabriel wearing priestly robe and sash. Jesus is similarly depicted because, according to the New Testament, he is the eternal high priest of mankind.

== Explanation and interpretation ==
Element	Biblical reference	Suggested meaning
Seven gold lampstands	Zechariah 4:11, 14 "What are...the lampstand?...These are...the Lord of all the earth."	The menorah used in the tabernacle and in the temple
Robe and golden sash	Exodus 28:4 "These are the vestments they shall make:...a robe,...and a sash. In making these sacred vestments which your brother Aaron and his sons are to wear in serving as my priests."	"Reminders of the official dress of the High Priest"
White hair	Isaiah 1:18 "Though your sins are like scarlet, they will be as white as snow; though they are as red as crimson, they will become like wool."	Like that of the Ancient of Days in Daniel 7 "Wisdom and the dignity of age"
Eyes like blazing fire	Psalm 139:12 "Even the darkness is not dark to You, but the night shines like the day, for darkness is as light to You."	They "read every heart and penetrate every hidden corner"
Feet like bronze	Ezekiel 1:27 "...and from what looked like the waist down, I saw something like the appearance of fire and brilliant light surrounding him."	Strength and stability Trampling enemies
Voice like rushing waters	Ezekiel 1:24 "Then I heard the sound of their wings, like the roaring of mighty waters, like the voice of the Almighty."	"The awe-inspiring power of a great waterfall"
Holding seven stars in his right hand	Deuteronomy 1:10 "The LORD your God has multiplied you, so that today you are as numerous as the stars in the sky."	Pleiades in Job 38:31; Supreme political authority "The right hand can be interpreted as a source of power and protection" Astrological imagery: "The stars may be thought of as controlling human fate, but Jesus controls the stars"
Double-edged sword coming out of his mouth	Ephesians 6:17 "And take...the sword of the Spirit, which is the word of God."	"His Word that works to save and to destroy"
Face like the sun	Isaiah 60:19 "No longer shall the sun be your light by day,...Rather, the LORD will be your light forever."	As at the Transfiguration

William Hendriksen suggests that the whole of the vision "is symbolical of Christ, the Holy One, coming to purge His churches," and to "punish those who are persecuting His elect."

== Significance of the seven stars ==
John tells us in Revelation 1:20 that the seven stars are the angels of the seven churches (Revelation 1:20)

In the New Testament, the Greek word for angels (aggelos) is not only used for heavenly angels, but also used for human messengers, such as John the Baptist (Matthew 11:10, Mark 1:2, Luke 7:27). Merrill Unger is of the opinion that human messengers is the meaning of the stars. In commenting on this verse, C. I. Scofield states: "The natural explanation of the "messengers" [angels] is that they were men sent by the seven churches to ascertain the state of the aged apostle ... but they figure any who bear God's messages to a church."

Several New Testament scholars believe that the angels are not human messengers. Isbon Beckwith says they represent the churches "ideal conception of its immanent spirit". Henry Barclay Swete refers to the angels as the "prevailing spirit" of the church.

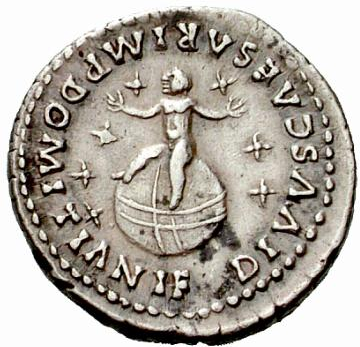
Reverse of a denarius of Domitian, depicting his son with seven stars

One aspect of the vision is the portrayal of Jesus holding seven stars in his right hand. Such a motif is also found on coins of the Emperor Domitian. Sometime between 77 and 81, Domitian's infant son died. He was subsequently deified, and is portrayed on coins of Domitian, with seven stars. Ernest Janzen argues that the globe on which the infant stands represents world dominion and power, while the stars indicate his divine nature; he is depicted as "the son of (a) god" and "conqueror of the world." Although Domitian's son cannot be said to be holding the stars, some scholars have drawn parallels between the numismatic and biblical evidences. Frederick Murphy notes that "Revelation's image of Jesus with seven stars in his hand may be an allusion to that coin and an implicit critique of it. It is not the Roman imperial family that has cosmic significance, but Jesus."

Austin Farrer, on the other hand, takes them to be the seven classical planets, and interprets the vision as representing Christ's lordship over time.

== See also ==
- Chronology of Revelation
- Resurrection appearances of Jesus
- Son of man (Christianity)
- Son of man (Judaism)
