= Seven churches of Asia =

Seven major churches of Early Christianity

Map of western Anatolia showing the island of Patmos and the locations of the cities housing the Seven Churches

The Seven Churches of Revelation, also known as the Seven Churches of the Apocalypse and the Seven Churches of Asia, are seven churches of early Christianity mentioned in the Book of Revelation, part of the New Testament. All of them were located in then-Greek-speaking Anatolia, and currently sit within the borders of present-day Turkey.

== Description ==
According to Revelation 1:11, on the island of Patmos in the far east of the Aegean Sea, Jesus instructed John of Patmos to "[w]rite in a book what you see in your visions, and send it to the seven churches, to Ephesus, to Smyrna, to Pergamum, to Thyatira, to Sardis, to Philadelphia, and to Laodicea." (Note: NA28: λεγούσης Ὃ βλέπεις γράψον εἰς βιβλίον καὶ πέμψον ταῖς ἑπτὰ ἐκκλησίαις, εἰς Ἔφεσον καὶ εἰς Σμύρναν καὶ εἰς Πέργαμον καὶ εἰς Θυάτειρα καὶ εἰς Σάρδεις καὶ εἰς Φιλαδελφίαν / Φιλαδέλφειαν καὶ εἰς Λαοδικίαν / Λαοδίκειαν.)

== The seven churches ==
The seven churches are named for their locations. The Book of Revelation provides descriptions of each Church.

- Ephesus (Revelation 2:1–7): known for having laboured hard and not fainted, and separating themselves from the wicked; admonished for having forsaken its first love (2:4)
- Smyrna (Revelation 2:8–11): admired for its tribulation and poverty; but for which it is foretold that it will suffer persecution (2:10)
- Pergamon (Revelation 2:12–17): located in a city where 'Satan's seat' is; needs to repent of allowing false teachers. Admonished for eating "food sacrificed to idols" and "sexual immorality". (2:16)
- Thyatira (Revelation 2:18–29): known for its charity, whose "latter works are greater than the former"; admonished for tolerating the teachings of a false prophetess.
- Sardis (Revelation 3:1–6): admonished to strengthen their commitment to pursue true life found through walking with Him in spirit and in truth. The Sardis assembly was composed of members spiritually alive - but not completely. Those not abiding are admonished to strengthen themselves in order to "walk with Him in white" as were the faithful in their midst. (3:4)
- Philadelphia (Revelation 3:7–13): known as steadfast in faith, keeping God's word and enduring patiently (3:10)
- Laodicea on the Lycus (see Laodicean Church) (Revelation 3:14–22): called lukewarm and insipid; described as fiscally wealthy but spiritually poor. (3:16)

== Seven messages ==
Some Christian historicists interpret the seven churches as representing seven periods in the history of the Western Church from the time of Paul the Apostle to the Second Coming. C. I. Scofield stated that "these messages by their very terms go beyond the local assemblies mentioned." He believes that the letters have a prophetic purpose disclosing the seven phases of the spiritual history. Other writers, such as Clarence Larkin, Henry Hampton Halley, Merrill Unger, and William M. Branham also have put forward the view that the seven churches preview the history of the global Church.

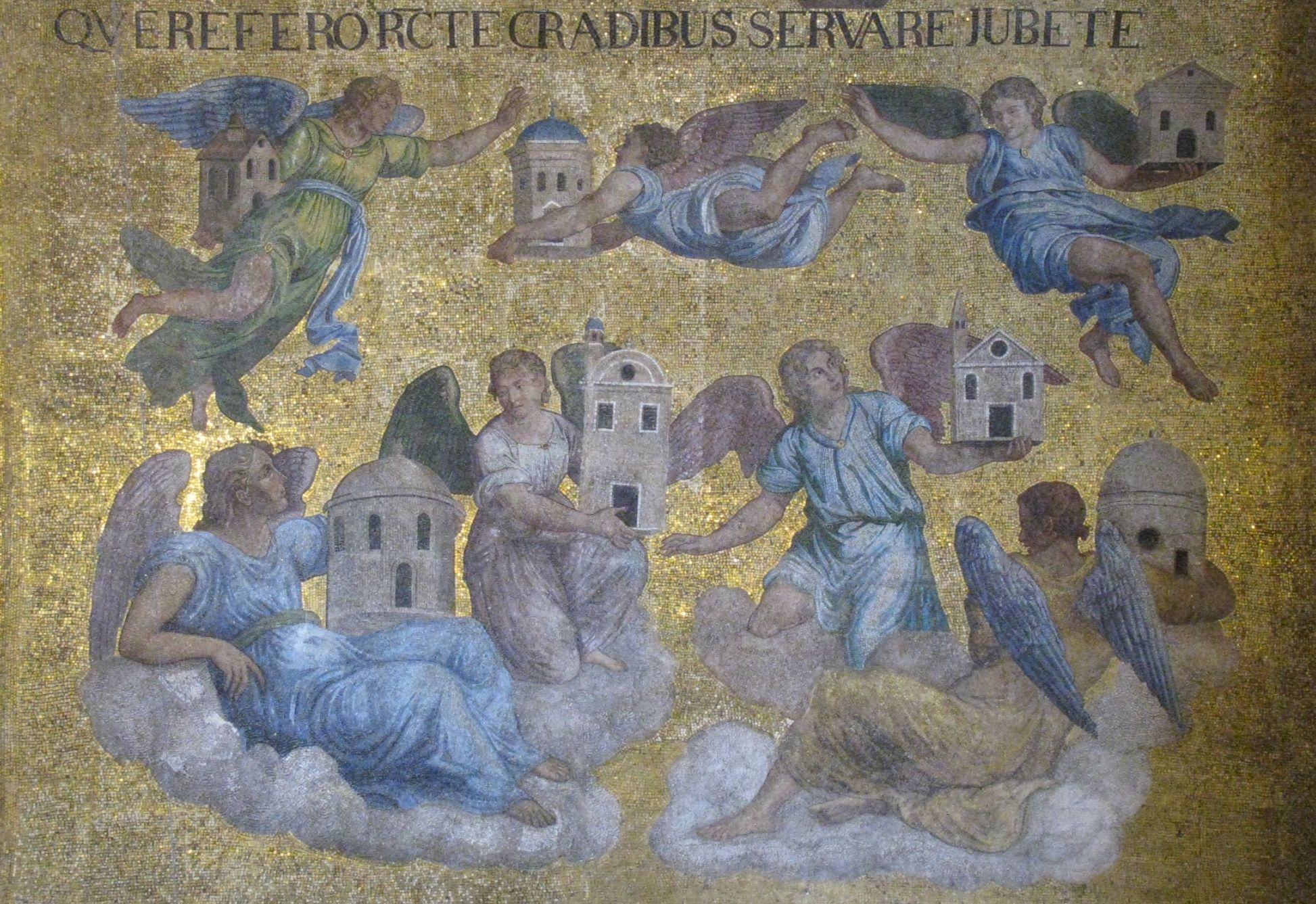
Mosaic in St Mark's Basilica of the seven angels

Historicism has been criticised by the Eastern Orthodox priest Dimitri Cozby, who writes that historicists take a greatly oversimplified view of history: "Since dispensationalism is Protestant in origin its 'Church history' is strictly Western. The dispensations take into account almost nothing of Orthodox history after the period of the early councils which we share with the West."

== Angels of the churches ==
Chapters 2–3 of the Revelation have specific messages for each of the seven angels of the seven churches. The message of each of the seven letters is directed to the angel of the particular church that is mentioned.

Origen explains that these "angels" are the guardian angels of the churches, a view upheld by Henry Alford. But Epiphanius of Salamis explicitly rejects this view, and, in accordance with the imagery of the passage, explains it as the bishops.

John's vision of the Son of Man walks among seven lampstands and has seven stars in his right hand. Revelation 1:20 states that "The seven stars are the angels of the seven churches, and the seven lampstands are the seven churches." The comparison of a teacher to a star is scriptural.

Augustine of Hippo's reason for interpreting angels of the churches as the prelates of the church is that St. John speaks of them as falling from their first charity, which is not true of the angels. Others would say that the falling away relates to the churches, not to the messengers, as each of the seven letters conclude with the words "He who has an ear, let him hear what Spirit says."

In the New Testament, the Greek term άγγελος is used for all messengers, whether divine or not, such as John the Baptist (Matthew 11:10, Mark 1:2, Luke 7:27) and God's prophets (Revelation 22:8–9) C.I. Scofield has noted that "The natural explanation of the 'messengers' is that they were men sent by the seven churches to ascertain the state of the aged apostle.

== The Seven Churches of Asia by Alexander Svoboda ==
In 1869, the London publishing firm Sampson Low, Son, and Marston published Alexander Svoboda's The Seven Churches of Asia. The Seven Churches of Asia is divided into three primary sections: an introduction written by English clergyman and Biblical scholar H. B. Tristram, Svoboda's personal travel account visiting the Seven Churches sites, and an itinerary detailing Svoboda's route. The book also includes twenty full-page photographs of the Seven Churches sites, photographed by Svoboda. These images are the first produced and published photographs of the Seven Churches. Photographs from Svoboda's Seven Churches project were exhibited in the rooms of the Arundel Society in London in 1868.

== See also ==
- Biblical numerology
- Classical planet
- Early centers of Christianity
- Eastern Christianity
