= Futurism (Christianity) =

Christian eschatological view

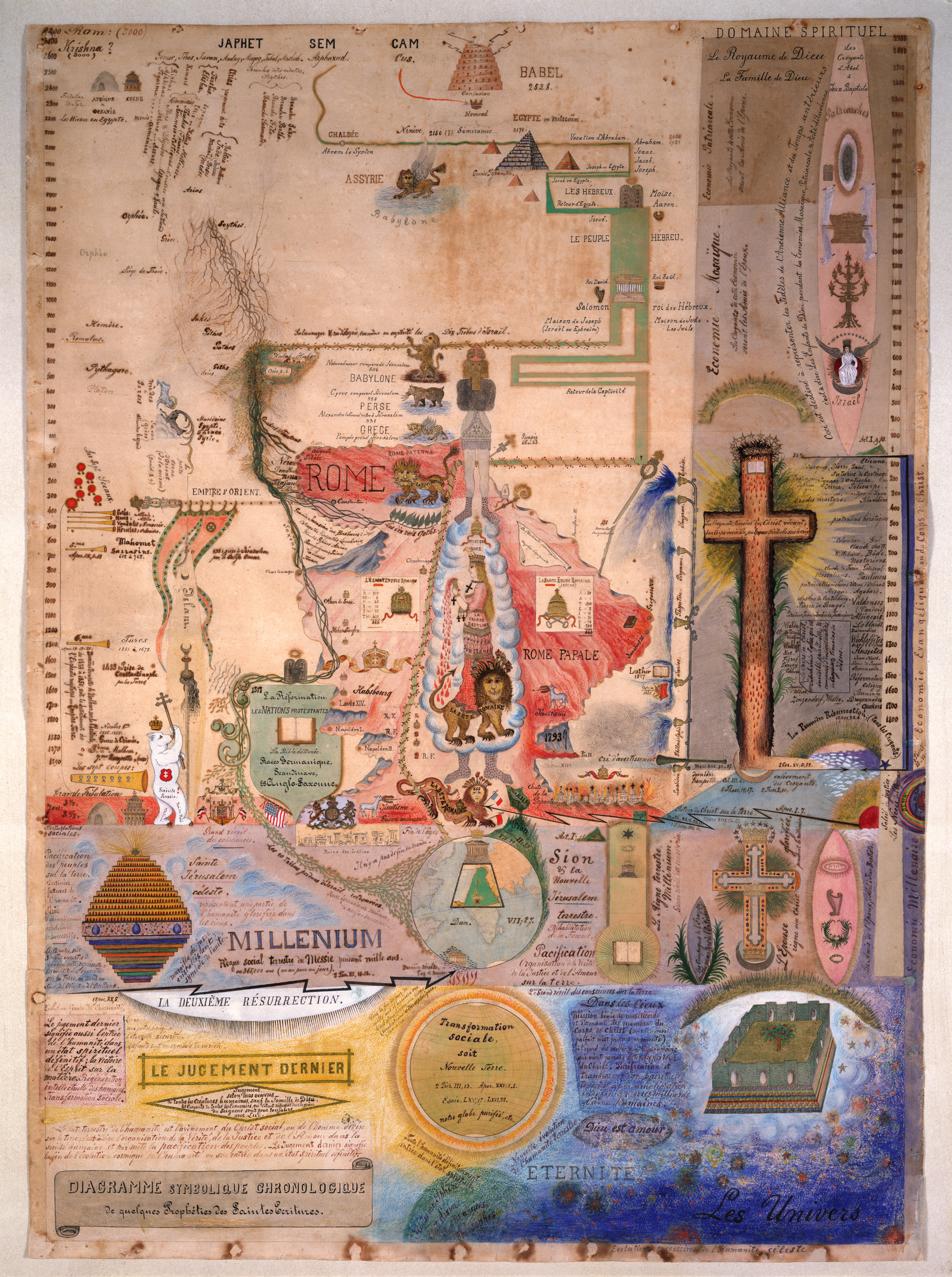
Diagram by Henry Dunant aiming to explain Revelation and Daniel as prophecies of future events.

Futurism is a Christian eschatological view that interprets portions of the Book of Revelation and other apocalyptic sections of the Bible as future "end-time" events. By comparison, other Christian eschatological views interpret these passages as past events in a symbolic, historic context, such as preterism and historicism, or as present-day events in a non-literal and spiritual context, as in idealism.

Futurist beliefs usually have a close association with premillennialism and dispensationalism. Historic premillennialism combines futurist and preterist views.

== Background ==
The term futurism refers to the fact that this view pushes prophecies in the apocalyptic sections of the Bible into a future "end time" occurrence. The futurist approach to the Book of Revelation contends that chapters 4-22 relate to a future time.

The alternatives to futurism are preterism, both full and partial, which views prophetic fulfillment as already having happened in the past; historicism, which sees the unfolding of prophetic scripture throughout the church age; and idealism, which views these scripture texts as spiritual.

All of these are hermeneutical approaches to prophetic apocalyptical scripture. They are separate from one's millennial view, which may be premillennial, postmillennial, or amillennial.

== History ==
Some elements of the futurist interpretation of Revelation and Daniel appeared in the early centuries of the Christian Church. However, the view was not popular. Irenaeus of Lyon (died c. 202), for instance, subscribed to the view that Daniel's 70th week awaited a future fulfillment.

During the Reformation, historicism was the dominant view. All, or nearly all of the reformers saw the pope as Antichrist. Futurism emerged after this time as a Roman Catholic response to historicism. This rise of futurism is generally associated with a Jesuit priest named Francisco Ribera (1537–1591). Ribera is said to have developed his scheme for the purpose of refuting historicism and its papal antichrist. A scheme similar to Ribera's was put forward by Italian archbishop Robert Bellarmine (1542-1621).

Another Jesuit, Manuel Lacunza (1731–1801), wrote in favor of futurism under the pen name "Ben-Ezra", and his work was banned by the Catholic Church. Until the 19th century, the futurist view was generally shunned by non-Catholics, being seen as a self-defense of the papacy against the claims of the historicist reformers.

The futurist view entered Protestant circles around 1827 through Samuel R. Maitland, librarian to the Archbishop of Canterbury. It began to expand into Protestantism in the 1800s through the teachings of John Nelson Darby and dispensationalism.

Futurism has grown in popularity in the 19th and 20th centuries, and is currently followed by millions of Christians.

== Beliefs ==
=== Zionism ===
Much of the futurist belief rests on the assumption that God has never given Israel all the land promised through Abraham and that the complete fulfillment of this promise is still in the future.

=== 70th week of Daniel ===
According to dispensational premillennialism, the seventieth week of Daniel's seventy weeks prophecy in Daniel 9:24-27 is yet unfulfilled, to occur in the future. The prophecy of weeks is interpreted as referring to years, with a week meaning 7 years. In this view, there is a gap, or "parenthesis" between the sixty-ninth and seventieth weeks. This is followed by a period of tribulation and the appearance of the Antichrist.

The seventieth week of the prophecy is expected to commence after the rapture of the church, which will incorporate the establishment of an economic system using the number '666', the reign of the beast (the Antichrist), the false religious system (the harlot), the Great Tribulation and Armageddon.

Controversy exists regarding the antecedent of he in Daniel 9:27. Many within the ranks of premillennialism do not affirm the "confirmation of the covenant" is made by Jesus Christ (as do many amillennarians) but that the antecedent of "he" in verse 27 refers back to verse 26 ("the prince who is to come"—i.e., the Antichrist). Antichrist will make a "treaty" as the Prince of the Covenant (i.e., "the prince who is to come") with Israel's future leadership at the commencement of the seventieth week of Daniel's prophecy; in the midst of the week, the Antichrist will break the treaty and commence persecution against a regathered Israel.

In contradistinction, historic premillennialism may or may not posit Daniel's 70th week as future yet retain the thesis of the future fulfillment of many of the prophecies of Major and Minor Prophets, the teachings of Christ (e.g., Matthew 24) and the book of Revelation.

=== The Olivet Discourse ===
The futurist view of the Olivet Discourse in Matthew 24 equates Jesus's teaching to be about the future Great Tribulation. Verses 4-14 cover the first half of the tribulation period, verses 15-29 relate to the second half of the tribulation, and verses 29-31 cover the Second Coming.

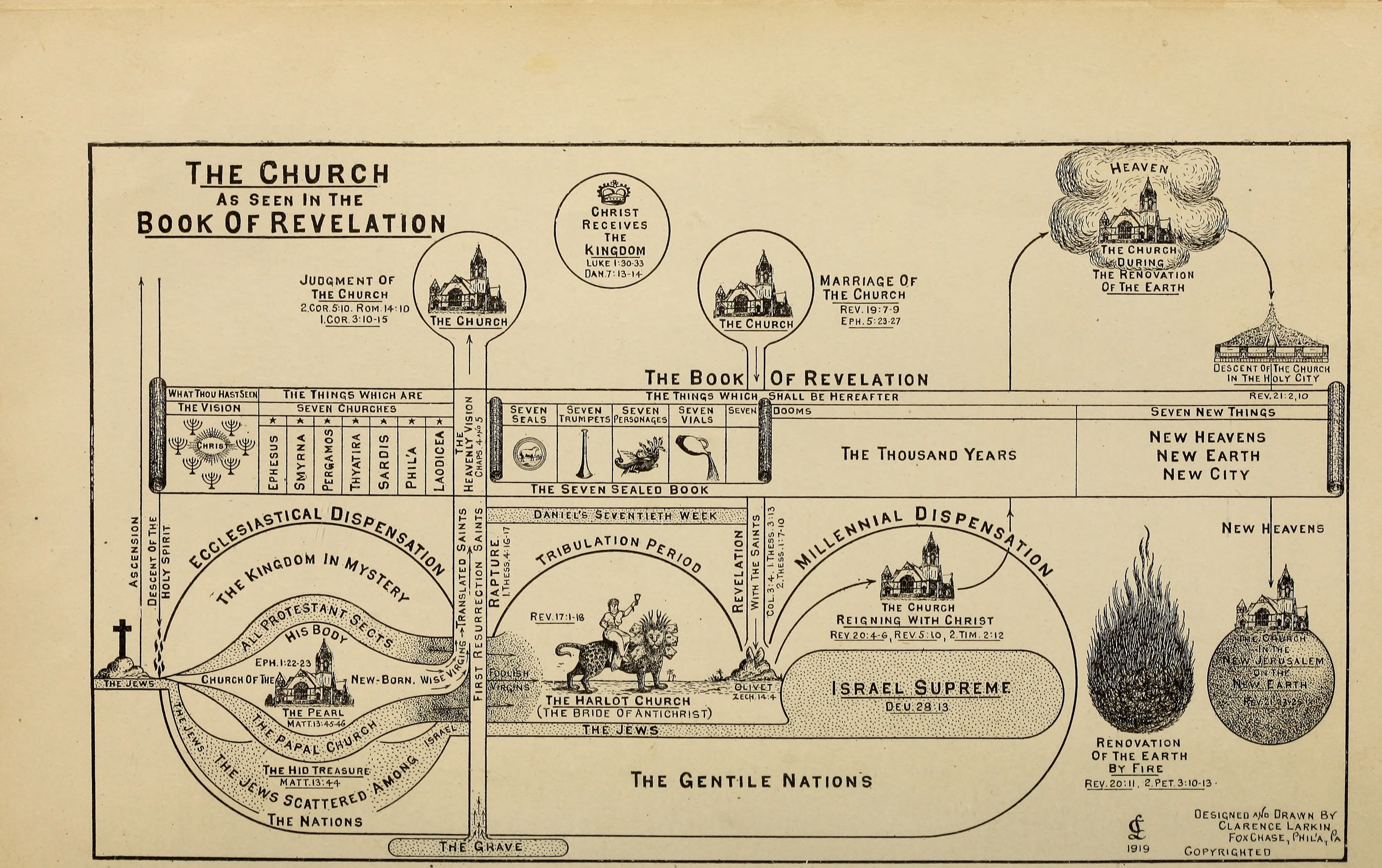
1919 chart by Clarence Larkin attempting to explain the events of Revelation.

=== Rapture and tribulation ===
Futurist interpretations generally predict a resurrection of the dead and a rapture of the living, wherein all true Christians are gathered to Christ prior to the time God's kingdom comes on earth. They also believe a tribulation will occur – a seven-year period of time when believers will experience worldwide persecution and martyrdom. Futurists differ on when believers will be raptured, but there are three primary views: 1) before the tribulation; 2) near or at the midpoint of the tribulation; or 3) at the end of the tribulation. There is also a fourth view of multiple raptures throughout the tribulation, but this view does not have a mainstream following.

- Pretribulationists believe that all Christians then alive will be taken up to meet Christ before the tribulation begins. In this manner, Christians are "kept from" the tribulation as suggested by some interpretations of Revelation 3:10. Pretribulationists tend to argue that Jesus' claim that some will be taken and others left suggests a pretribulation rapture. Pretribulationalists also claim the katechon in 2 Thessalonians 2 is the church or holy spirit. They claim the church must be removed before the man of sin shows up and that the katechon's removal is needed to facilitate the man of sin's deception.
- Midtribulationists believe that the rapture of the faithful will occur approximately halfway through the tribulation, after it begins but before the worst part of it occurs. Some midtribulationists, particularly those holding to a "pre-wrath rapture" of the church, believe that God's wrath is poured out during a "Great Tribulation" that is limited to the last 3½ years of the tribulation, after believers have been caught up to Christ.
- Posttribulationists believe that Christians will be gathered in the clouds with Christ after the "tribulation of those days" as mentioned in Matthew 24:29-31 and join him in his return to earth. Posttribulationists claim the rapture coincides with the resurrection at the second coming. They also claim the rapture occurs at the last trumpet as mentioned in 1 Corinthians 15:52, which they believe is synonymous with the 7th trumpet of Revelation.

All three views hold that Christians will return with Christ at the end of the tribulation. Proponents of all three views also generally portray Israel as unwittingly signing a seven-year peace treaty with the Antichrist, which initiates the seven-year tribulation. Many also tend to view the Antichrist as head of a revived Roman Empire, but the geographic location of this empire is unknown. Hal Lindsey suggests that this revived Roman Empire will be centered in western Europe, with Rome as its capital. Tim LaHaye promotes the belief that Babylon will be the capital of a worldwide empire. Joel Richardson and Walid Shoebat have both recently written books proposing a revived eastern Roman Empire, which will fall within the boundaries of the Ottoman Empire. (Istanbul also has seven hills, was a capital of the Roman Empire as Constantinople, known as the Byzantine Empire, and a body of water in the city is known as the Golden Horn – notable given the eschatological references to the "Little Horn" Daniel 7:8,8:9.)

=== Great Tribulation ===
In the futurist view of Christian eschatology, the tribulation is a relatively short period of time where anyone who chose not to follow God before the Rapture and was left behind (according to pre-tribulation doctrine, not mid- or posttribulation teaching) will experience worldwide hardships, disasters, famine, war, pain, and suffering, which will wipe out more than 75% of all life on the earth before the Second Coming takes place.

According to dispensationalists who hold the futurist view, the tribulation is thought to occur before the Second Coming of Jesus and during the End Times. Another version holds that it will last seven years in all, being the last of Daniel's prophecy of seventy weeks. This viewpoint was first made popular by John Nelson Darby in the 19th century and was recently popularized by Hal Lindsey in The Late Great Planet Earth. It is theorized that each week represents seven years, with the timetable beginning from Artaxerxes' order to rebuild the Temple in Jerusalem (the Second Temple). After seven plus 62 weeks, the prophecy says that the messiah will be "cut off", which is taken to correspond to the death of Christ. This is seen as creating a break of indeterminate length in the timeline, with one week remaining to be fulfilled.

This seven-year 'week' may be further divided into two periods of 3½ years each, from the two 3½ year periods in Daniel's prophecy where the last seven years are divided into two 3½ year periods, (Daniel 9:27) The time period for these beliefs is also based on other passages: in the book of Daniel, "time, times, and half a time", interpreted as "a year, two years, and half a year," and the Book of Revelation, "a thousand two hundred and threescore days" and "forty and two months" (the prophetic month averaging 30 days, hence 1260/30 = 42 months or 3½ years). The 1290 days of Daniel 12:11, (rather than the 1260 days of Revelation 11:3), is thought to be the result of either a simple intercalary leap month adjustment, or due to further calculations related to the prophecy, or due to an intermediate stage of time that is to prepare the world for the beginning of the millennial reign.

==== Events ====
Among futurists there are differing views about what will happen to Christians during the tribulation:

- Pretribulationists believe that all Christians (dead and alive) will be taken bodily to Heaven (called the Rapture) before the tribulation begins. According to this doctrine, every true Christian that has ever existed throughout the course of the entire Christian era will be instantaneously transformed into a perfect resurrected body, and will thus escape the trials of the tribulation. Those who become Christians after the rapture will live through (or perish during) the tribulation. After the tribulation, Christ will return to establish His Millennial Kingdom.
- Prewrath tribulationists believe the Rapture will occur after the tribulation, but before the seven bowls of the wrath of God.
- Midtribulationists believe that the Rapture will occur halfway through the tribulation, but before the worst part of it occurs. The seven-year period is divided into halves – the "beginning of sorrows" and the "great tribulation".
- Posttribulationists believe that Christians will not be taken up into Heaven, but will be received or gathered by Christ into the Kingdom of God on earth at the end of the tribulation.

In pretribulationism and midtribulationism, the Rapture and the Second Coming (or Greek, par[a]ousia) of Christ are separate events, while in posttribulationism the two events are identical or simultaneous. Another feature of the pre- and mid-tribulation beliefs is the idea that after the Rapture, Christ will return for a third time (when also counting the first coming) to set up his kingdom on the earth.

Some, including many Roman Catholic theologians, do not believe in a "time of trouble" period as usually described by tribulationists, but rather that there will be a near utopian period led by the Antichrist.

=== Millennium ===
Futurism is premillennial. Premillennialism believes that Christ will return to Earth, bind Satan, and reign for a literal thousand years on Earth with Jerusalem as his capital. Thus Christ returns before ("pre-") the thousand years mentioned in chapter 20. There are generally two subclasses of premillennialism: dispensational and historic. Some form of premillennialism is thought to be the oldest millennial view in church history. Papias, believed to be a disciple of the Apostle John, was a premillennialist, according to Eusebius. Also Justin Martyr and Irenaeus expressed belief in premillennialism in their writings.

== Proponents ==
- Gleason Archer
- Donald Barnhouse
- John Nelson Darby
- Martin De Haan
- Arno Clemens Gaebelein
- Norman Geisler
- Robert Govett
- Thomas Ice
- Harry A. Ironside
- David Jeremiah
- Walter Kaiser, Jr.
- Arthur Katz
- Tim LaHaye
- Clarence Larkin
- Hal Lindsey
- Ernst Lohmeyer
- John F. MacArthur
- J. Vernon McGee]
- Henry M. Morris
- William A. Newell
- J. Dwight Pentecost
- Lewis Sperry Chafer
- John Bertram Phillips
- Francisco Ribera
- Charles Caldwell Ryrie
- C. I. Scofield
- Ray Stedman
- Chuck Swindoll
- Merrill Tenney
- Jack Van Impe
- John Walvoord
- Warren W. Wiersbe
- John Whitcomb
- Peter Ruckman

== See also ==
- Christian eschatology
- Millenarianism
- Posttribulation rapture
- Progressive dispensationalism
- Summary of Christian eschatological differences
- Rapture
