= Historic premillennialism =

One of the two premillennial systems of Christian eschatology

Historic premillennialism is one of the two premillennial systems of Christian eschatology, with the other being dispensational premillennialism. It differs from dispensational premillennialism in that it only has one view of the rapture, and does not require a literal seven-year tribulation (though some adherents do believe in a seven-year tribulation). Historic premillennialists hold to a posttribulational rapture, meaning the church is raised to meet Christ in the air after the trials experienced during the Great Tribulation. Historic premillennialism does not require that apocalyptic prophecies be interpreted literally. The doctrine is called "historic" because many early church fathers appear to have held it, including Irenaeus, Justin Martyr, and Papias. Posttribulational premillennialism is the Christian eschatological view that the second coming of Jesus Christ will occur prior to a thousand-year reign of the saints but subsequent to the Great Apostasy (and to any tribulation).

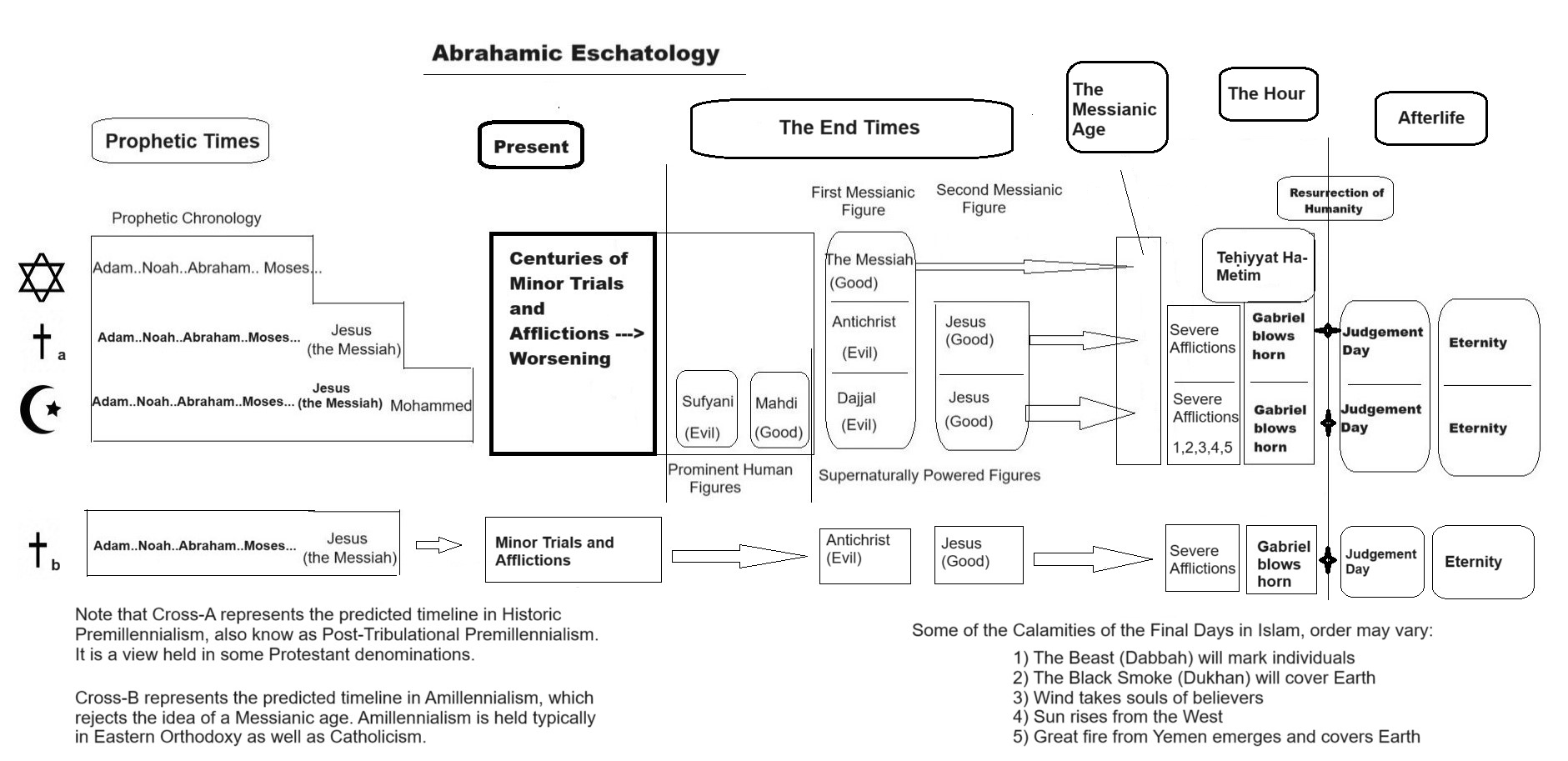
Unreliable Amateur Eschatological Chart

== Comparison ==
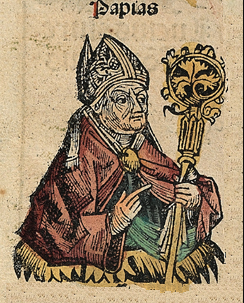
Papias was an early advocate of millennialism

Premillennialism is a view alternative to both postmillennialism, which teaches that the Second Coming of Jesus will occur after a thousand-year period of righteousness, and to amillennialism, which teaches that the thousand-year period is not meant to be taken literally but is the current church/messianic age. The two major species of premillennialism are historic and dispensational premillennialism, the latter of which is associated with pretribulational and midtribulational views. See the summary of Christian eschatological differences.

A major difference between historic and dispensational premillennialism is the view of the church in relation to Israel. Historic premillennialists do not see so sharp a distinction between Israel and the church as the dispensationalists do, but instead view believers of all ages as part of one group, now revealed as the body of Christ. Thus, historic premillennialists see no issue with the church going through the Great Tribulation, and their system does not require a separate pretribulational rapture of some believers as the dispensational system does.

== History ==
Premillennialism was supported in the early church by Papias, Irenaeus, Justin Martyr, Tertullian, Pseudo-Barnabas, Methodius, Lactantius, Commodianus, Theophilus, Melito, Hippolytus of Rome, Victorinus of Pettau, Nepos, Julius Africanus, Commodianus, Tatian and Montanus. However, the premillennial views of Montanus probably affected the later rejection of premillennialism in the Church, as Montanism was seen as a heresy.

Proponents of historic premillennialism include Baptists, Presbyterians, the Christian and Missionary Alliance, and several Evangelical groups. Individual proponents of historic premillennialism include: John Gill, Robert Shank, Charles Spurgeon, Mike Bickle, Benjamin Wills Newton (a contemporary and fierce theological rival of the father of dispensationalism), George Eldon Ladd, Albert Mohler, Clarence Bass, John Piper, Francis Schaeffer, D. A. Carson, Gordon Clark, Bryan Chapell, and Carl F. H. Henry.

== See also ==
- Book of Revelation
