= Pretribulation rapture =

Christian eschatological concept

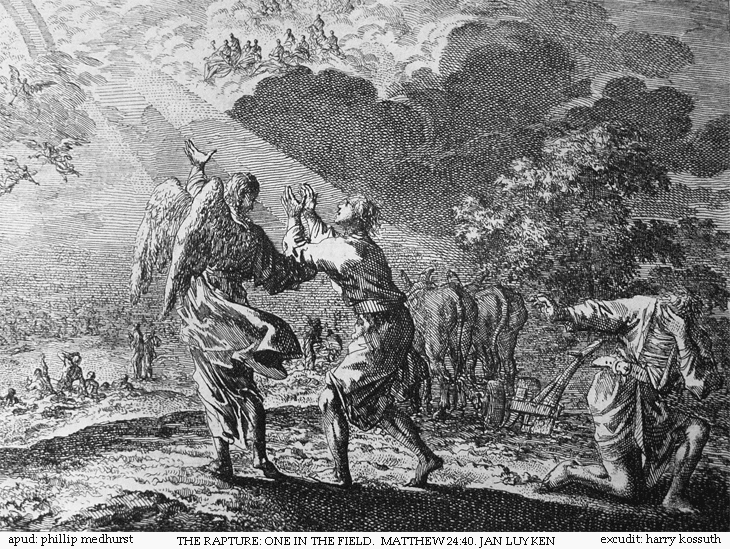
Jan Luyken's illustration of the rapture as found in the Bowyer Bible.

The pretribulation rapture doctrine is the belief in a rapture, or gathering of the saints, that occurs before the Great Tribulation.

This view is generally associated with dispensational premillennialism, and it was popularized in the 20th century by the Scofield Reference Bible.

== History ==
=== Proposed forerunners ===
Mark Hitchcock and Thomas Ice have suggested that Fra Dolcino (c. 1250–1307) taught a pretribulational rapture. The relevant teaching was that when Antichrist appears, Dolcino and his followers would be taken away and preserved from Antichrist, and that following the death of Antichrist, Dolcino and his followers would return to Earth to convert those then living to the true faith. However, the source is an anonymous 1316 Latin text titled The History of Brother Dolcino, so it is uncertain whether Dolcino actually taught it.

Similarly, the dispensational author William C. Watson in his book Dispensationalism Before Darby has argued that earlier authors such as the Puritan Nathaniel Holmes (1599–1678) held to a pretribulational rapture view. The Baptist pastor Morgan Edwards (1722–1792) has often also been viewed as holding to a pretribulational rapture. Because his view was premillennial, he wrote in his 1788 book Millennium, Last Days Novelties of the first resurrection taking place with Christ in the air, he is referenced by dispensational premillennialists such as Tim LaHaye to support the view that a pretribulation rapture theology existed prior to John Nelson Darby (1800–1882).

=== Darby's influence ===
The pretribulational rapture is often associated with John Nelson Darby (1800–1882), who developed the theological system that has been known as dispensationalism, which incorporated the pretribulational rapture into its system. This was strongly popularized in the 20th century by the publication of the Scofield Reference Bible, which followed Darby's system which viewed Israel and the Church as being distinct peoples of God, with their own distinct purposes in God's redemptive plan for humanity.

== Doctrine ==
According to Dwight Pentecost, the pretribulational rapture is built upon the literal method of interpreting the Bible, leading to a literal premillennial understanding of prophecy. Dispensationalists understand the tribulation period as specifically being meant for Israel, due to their interpretation of "Jacob's trouble" in Jeremiah 30:7 as referring to this time period. Thus, it is argued that the scope of the tribulation prevents the church from participating in the time. Advocates of the pretribulational rapture often argue that the lack of an explicit mention of the church within the book of Revelation when describing the tribulation period implies that the church was taken away.

Advocates of the pretribulational rapture view the rapture as distinct from the second coming of Jesus mentioned in the Olivet Discourse, viewing it as referring to the second coming of Christ after the tribulation. Thus, the rapture is viewed as the removal of all believers from the earth, where he comes to claim his bride, while in the second coming Jesus returns to the earth with his bride.

=== Imminence ===
Often associated with the pretribulational rapture is the doctrine of imminence, the claim that no prophecy will necessarily precede the rapture. Thus in the pretribulational view, the rapture could happen at any moment without any signs. Pretribulationalists argue that the Biblical commands in 1 Corinthians 1:7, Philippians 3:20-21 and James 5:8-9 imply the doctrine of imminency. However, these implications are rejected by those who hold to alternative views of the rapture.
