= Francis Nigel Lee =

American theologian (1934–2011)

The Reverend Professor Francis Nigel Lee
- Born: 5 December 1934; Kendal, Westmorland, England
- Died: 23 December 2011 (aged 77)
- Occupations: Professor, minister, writer

Francis Nigel Lee (5 December 1934 – 23 December 2011) was a British-born Christian theologian and minister. Lee was particularly known for the large number of academic degrees he earned from a variety of institutions. He obtained BA, LLB and MA degrees from the University of Cape Town; L.Th, BD, M.Th and Th.D. degrees from the University of Stellenbosch; a Ph.D. from the University of the Free State; and several other doctorates from unaccredited institutions, including D.Min, STD and D.Hum degrees from Whitefield Theological Seminary.

Lee was born in Kendal in the UK, but emigrated as a child to South Africa, where he became a minister. Lee moved to the USA, where he served as a minister in the Presbyterian Church in America, as Professor of Philosophy at Shelton College, New Jersey and as Academic Dean of Graham Bible College in Bristol, Tennessee. Lee then moved to Australia, where he served as Professor at the Presbyterian Church of Queensland Theological Hall.

Stuart Piggin notes that Lee "exuberantly led the resurgence of Reformed theology among Queensland Presbyterians."

Lee was a firm advocate of the historicist method of interpretation in Christian eschatology, as well as postmillennialism.

== Published works ==
- Lee, Francis Nigel (2001). John's Revelation Unveiled. Historicism Research Foundation. ISBN 0962068136. — Borrow at the Internet Archive
- Lee, Francis Nigel (2005). The Central Significance of Culture. Reformation Christian Ministries. ISBN 0977344207.
- Lee, Francis Nigel (2006). Always Victorious! The Earliest Church Not Pre- But Post- Millennial. Bexley Christian Publications. ISBN 1411673018.
- Lee, Francis Nigel (2007). God's Ten Commandments: Yesterday, Today, Forever. Nordskog Publishing, Inc. ISBN 978-0979673627.
