= Clarence Larkin =

American pastor (1850–1924)

Rev. Clarence Larkin
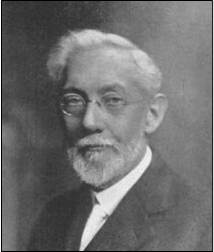
- Born: Clarence Larkin; October 28, 1850; Chester, Pennsylvania, U.S.
- Died: January 24, 1924 (aged 73)
- Occupations: American Baptist pastor, Bible teacher and author
- Writing career
- Genres: Christian apologetics, Christian theology
- Notable works: Dispensational Truth; Rightly Dividing the Word; The Book of Daniel; Second Coming of Christ

Clarence Larkin (1850–1924) was an American Baptist pastor, Bible teacher and author whose writings on dispensationalism had a great impact on conservative Protestant visual culture in the 20th century. His intricate and influential charts provided readers with a visual strategy for mapping God's action in history and for interpreting complex biblical prophecies.

== Biography ==
Larkin was born on October 28, 1850, in Chester, Delaware County, Pennsylvania. He experienced Christian conversion at the age of 19. Larkin worked in a bank until 21 when he enrolled in college, graduating with a mechanical engineering degree. He worked as a professional draftsman, then became a teacher of the blind. This last endeavor cultivated his descriptive faculties, while his drafting experience aided in charting dispensational theology. Later, failing health compelled him to give up teaching. After a prolonged rest, he engaged in the manufacturing business.

When first converted, Larkin become a member of the Episcopal Church, but in 1882 at the age of 32, his position on baptism was challenged, and for two years studied the subject. As a result, he left the Episcopal Church and became a Baptist. Larkin wrote the book Why I Am a Baptist as part of that study, and was ordained as a Baptist minister two years later, entering the ministry. Larkin's first pastorate was in Kennett Square, Pennsylvania; his second was in Fox Chase, Pennsylvania, where he remained for 20 years. His study of the Scriptures led him to adopt many of the tenets of the premillennialist theology that was gaining favor in conservative Protestant circles in the Gilded Age. Larkin created large wall charts, which he titled "Prophetic Truth," for his pulpit sermons. He was also invited to teach theology in other venues. During this time he published a number of prophetical charts, which were widely circulated, and contributed articles for the Sunday School Times.

In 1918, he completed Dispensational Truth, but high demand for the work led him to produce a greatly expanded edition of 1920. Larkin was an advocate of gap creationism.

=== Notable works ===
Larkin's first major publication was dispensational Truth (or God's Plan and Purpose in the Ages), which contains many charts. The preparation of the charts and text took Larkin three years to produce. The book is a defense of premillennialist dispensationalism that draws on the major themes found in the works of figures like C.I. Scofield, William Eugene Blackstone, and John Nelson Darby.

After the second printing of Dispensational Truth, Larkin revised and expanded it, releasing it in its present form of over 300 pages. Following this success, Larkin published five additional works: Rightly Dividing the Word; The Book of Daniel; Spirit World; Second Coming of Christ; and A Medicine Chest for Christian Practitioners, a handbook on evangelism.

Like C. I. Scofield, he postulated seven separate dispensations—the current being the "Dispensation of Grace," "Church Dispensation," "Ecclesiastical Dispensation," or "Parenthetical Dispensation." This position held that the church age filled a "gap" in the timeline of biblical prophecy.

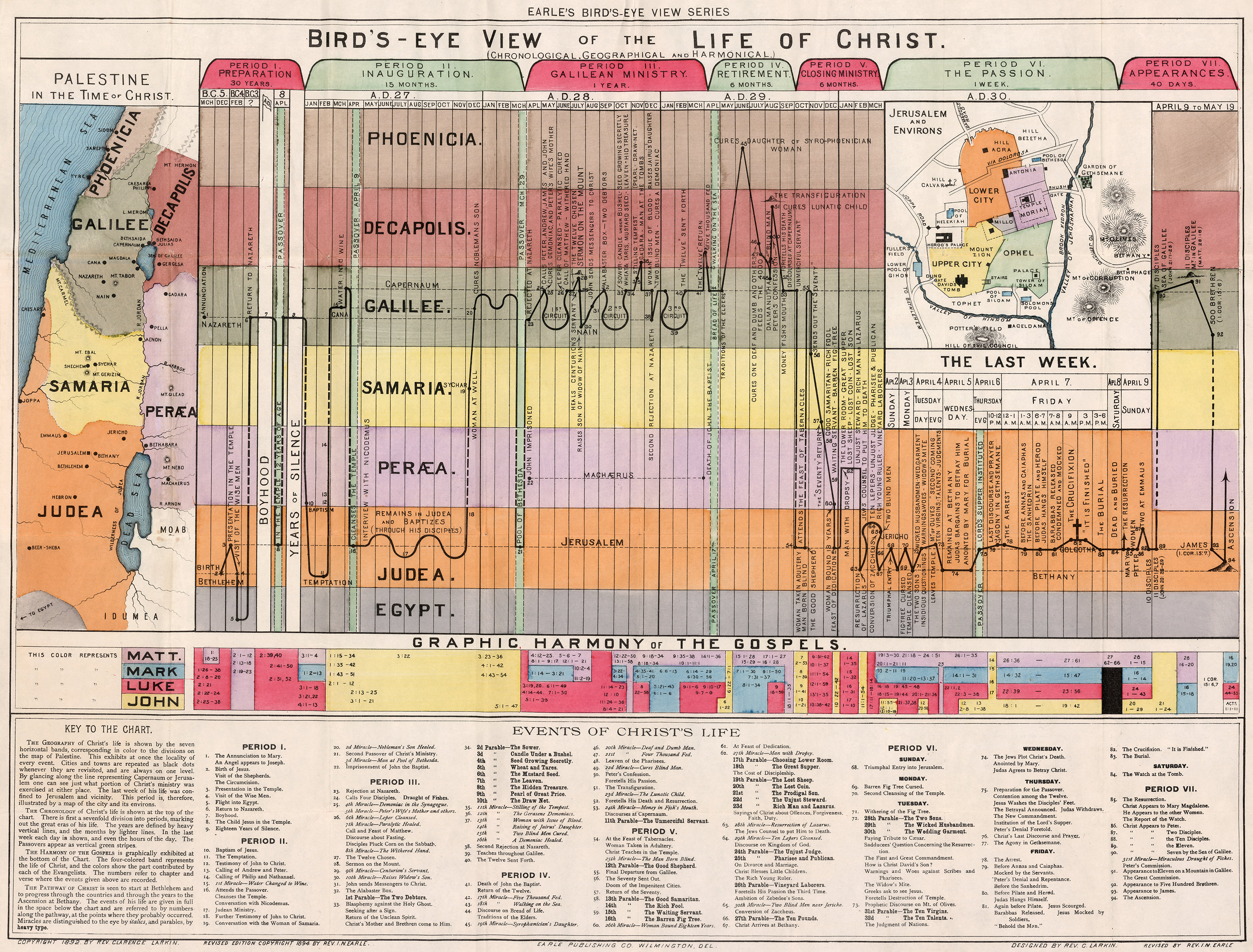
Chart by Clarence Larkin showing a timeline of the life of Jesus Christ

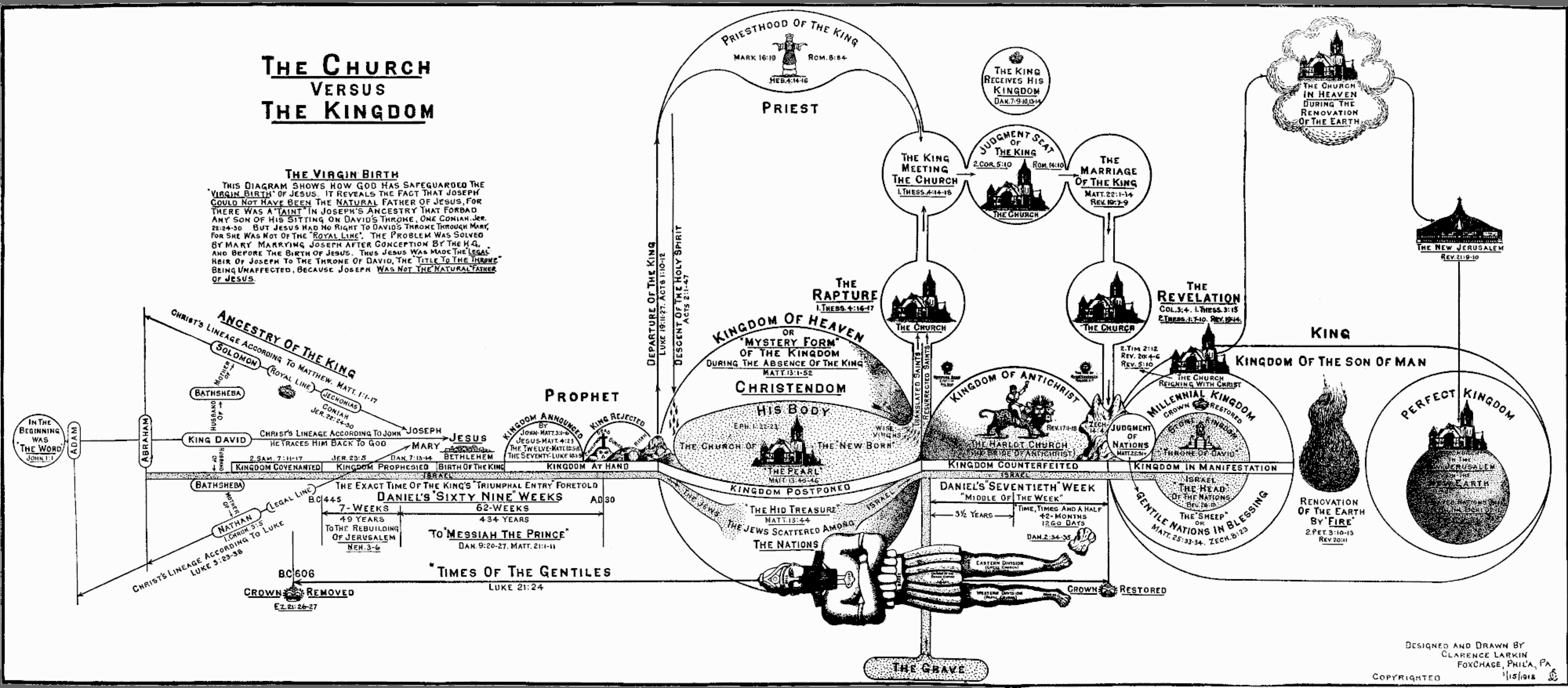
Timetable of Bible prophecy according to dispensational premillennialism, by Clarence Larkin, 1918.

=== Later years ===
Larkin disliked the tendency of writers to say uncharitable things about each other, so he sought to avoid criticisms and to satisfy himself with presenting his understanding of the Scriptures. During the last five years of his life, the demand for Larkin's books made it necessary for him to give up the pastorate and devote his full-time to writing. He died on January 24, 1924.
