= Rapture =

Eschatological concept in Christianity

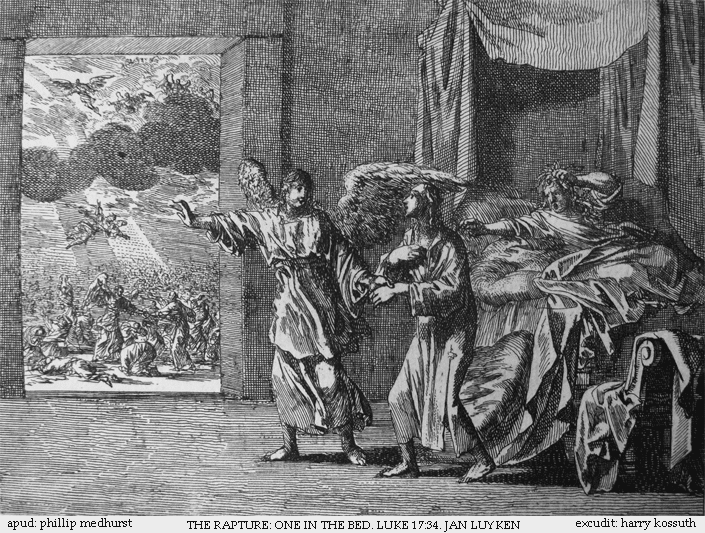
One in the bed

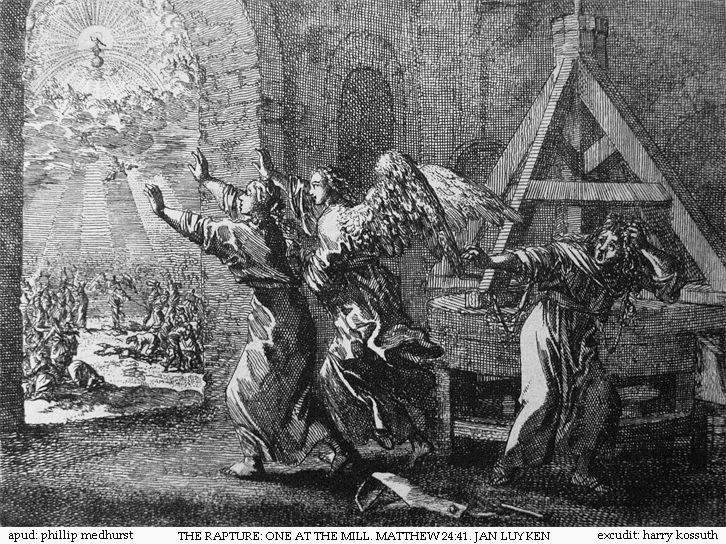
One at the mill

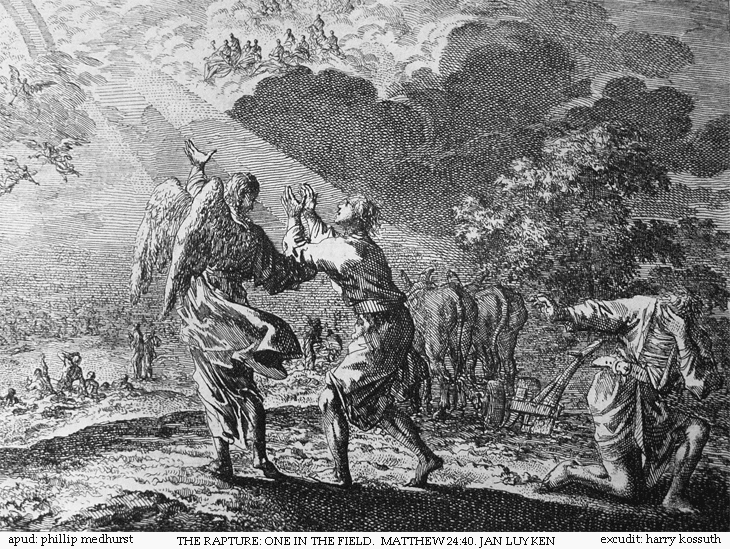
One in the field

Jan Luyken's illustration of Matthew 24 verse 40, from the 1795 Bowyer Bible, which proponents take as a reference to the rapture

The Rapture is an eschatological (end-times) concept held by some Protestant Christians, particularly those of American evangelicalism, consisting of an event when all dead Christian believers will be resurrected and, joined with Christians who are still alive, together will rise "in the clouds, to meet the Lord in the air."

Many different timelines have been asserted that tie to ideas of a seven-year Great Tribulation: pretribulation, midtribulation, prewrath, and posttribulation raptures; and to a thousand-year age of Messianic rule: millennialism, premillennialism, postmillennialism, amillennialism, and preterism.

The origin of the term extends from the First Epistle to the Thessalonians in the Bible, which uses the Greek word harpazo (Ancient Greek: ἁρπάζω), meaning "to snatch away" or "to seize". The idea of a rapture as it is defined in dispensational premillennialism is not found in historic Christianity and is a relatively recent doctrine originating from the 1830s.

Most Christian denominations, and the numerically largest, do not subscribe to rapture theology and have a different interpretation of the aerial gathering described in 1 Thessalonians 4. They do not use rapture as a specific theological term, nor do they generally subscribe to the dispensational theology associated with its use. Instead they typically interpret rapture in the sense of the elect gathering with Christ in Heaven directly after the Second Coming and reject outright the idea that a large portion of humanity will be left behind on Earth for an extended tribulation period after the events of 1 Thessalonians 4:17.

== Etymology ==
Rapture is derived from Middle French rapture, via the Medieval Latin raptura ("seizure, kidnapping"), which derives from the Latin raptus ("a carrying off").

=== Greek ===
The Koine Greek of 1 Thessalonians 4:17 uses the verb form ἁρπαγησόμεθα (harpagēsometha), which means "we shall be caught up" or "we shall be taken away". The dictionary form of this Greek verb is harpazō (ἁρπάζω). This use is also seen in such texts as Acts 8:39, 2 Corinthians 12:2–4, and Revelation 12:5. Linguist, Dr. Douglas Hamp, notes that Greek scholar Spiros Zodhiates lists harpagēsometha as the first-person plural future passive indicative of the Greek stem, harpagē (har-pag-ay), "the act of plundering, plunder, spoil." The future passive indicative of harpázō (although not used by Paul in 1 Thess. 4:17) can be viewed at verbix.com: ἁρπασθησόμεθα (harpasthēsometha). GS724 harpagē means: 1. the act of plundering, robbery; 2. plunder, spoil. When the rapture and the "restoration of all things" (Acts 3:20–21) are viewed as simultaneous events (according to Romans 8:19–21) then it makes sense why Paul would use "shall be plundered" to match the verbiage of the distortion of the Earth described in Isaiah 24:3, "The land shall be entirely emptied and utterly plundered ...".

=== Latin ===
The Latin Vulgate translates the Greek ἁρπαγησόμεθα as rapiemur (Note: 1 Thessalonians 4:17: "deinde nos qui vivimus qui relinquimur simul rapiemur cum illis in nubibus obviam Domino in aera et sic semper cum Domino erimus" (Latin Vulgate).) meaning "we will be caught up" or "we will be taken away" from the Latin verb rapio meaning "to catch up" or "take away".

=== English ===
English translations of the Bible have translated 1 Thessalonians 4:17 in various ways:

- Wycliffe's Bible (1395), translated from the Latin Vulgate, uses "ravished". (Note: 1 Thessalonians 4:16: "Afterward we that lyuen, that ben left, schulen be rauyschid togidere with hem in cloudis, metinge Crist'in to the eir; and so euere more we schulen be with the Lord.")
- The Tyndale New Testament (1525), the Bishop's Bible (1568), the Geneva Bible (1587) and the King James Version (1611) use "caught up". (Note: Bishop's Bible 17 "Than we which lyue, which remaine, shalbe caught up together with them in the cloudes, to meete the Lorde in the ayre: And so shall we euer be with the Lorde.") This is carried over to the American Standard Version (1901), the Revised Standard Version (1946, 1952) and the English Standard Version (2001, 2007, 2011, 2016), as well as the New International Version (1973, 1978, 1984, 2011).

== Doctrinal position ==
A pretribulational rapture view is most commonly found among American Baptists, Bible churches, Brethren churches, certain Methodist denominations, Pentecostals, non-denominational evangelicals, and various other evangelical groups.

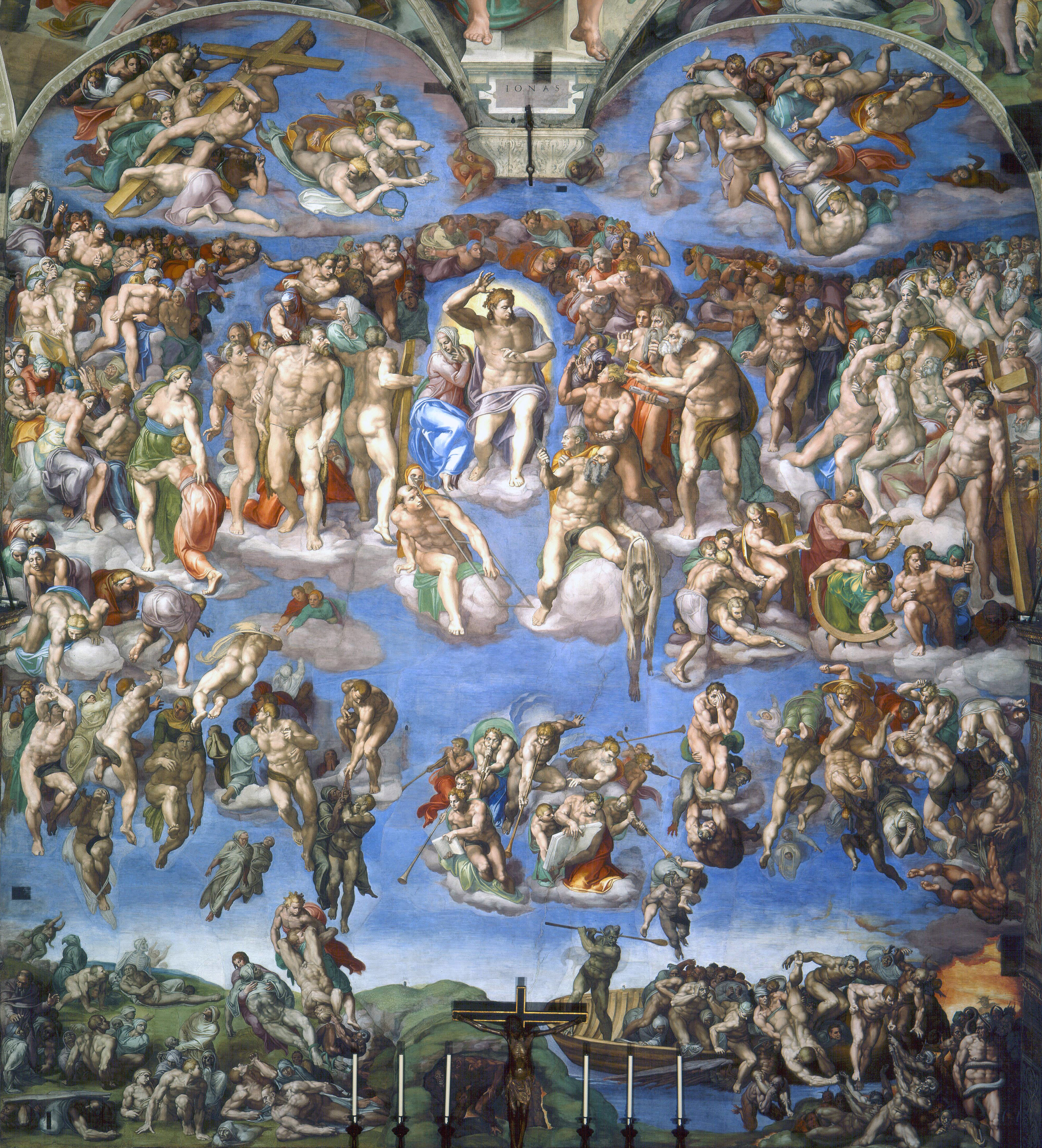
Vatican City. Sistine Chapel. The Fresco "The Last Judgement" by Michelangelo, 16th century. Catholic view of resurrection at Christ's return, with angelic aerial couriers and saints assisting.

Historically, the Roman Catholic, Eastern Orthodox, Lutheran, Anglican, and Reformed churches, have no tradition of a preliminary return of Christ. The Eastern Orthodox Church, for example, favors the amillennial interpretation of prophetic Scriptures and thus rejects a preliminary, premillennial return. Most Methodists do not adhere to the dispensationalist view of the rapture.

=== Aquinas and Augustine of Hippo ===
In his Compendium Theologiae, Thomas Aquinas quotes another Doctor of the Church, St Augustine, to explain that no one is spared death and the separation of the soul from the body. The rapture of the Church, on the other hand, concerns the death of the faithful and their immediate resurrection of the flesh immediately after death:

Accordingly those who are found alive at the Lord's coming will be marked off from those who have died before, not for the reason that they will never die, but because in the very act by which they are taken up "in the clouds to meet Christ, into the air" (1 Thessalonians 4:16), they will die and immediately rise again, as Augustine teaches.

— Compendium Theologiae, Ch. 243

== Views ==
=== One or two events ===
Most premillennialists distinguish the Rapture and the Second Coming as separate events. Some dispensational premillennialists (including many evangelicals) hold the return of Christ to be two distinct events (i.e., Christ's second coming in two stages). According to this view, 1 Thessalonians 4:15–17 is a description of a preliminary event to the return described in Matthew 24:29–31. Although both describe a coming of Jesus, these are seen to be different events. The first event is a coming where the saved are to be 'caught up,' whence the term "rapture" is taken. The second event is described as the second coming. The majority of dispensationalists hold that the first event precedes the period of tribulation, even if not immediately (see chart for additional dispensationalist timing views). Dispensationalists distinguish these events as a result of their own literal understanding of Paul's words.

Amillennialists deny the interpretation of a literal thousand-year earthly rule of Christ. There is considerable overlap in the beliefs of amillennialists, postmillennialists, and historic premillennialists with those who hold that the return of Christ will be a single, public event.

Some proponents believe the doctrine of amillennialism originated with Alexandrian scholars such as Clement and Origen and later became Catholic dogma through Augustine.

=== Destination ===
Dispensationalists see the immediate destination of the raptured Christians as being Heaven. Catholic commentators, such as Walter Drum (1912), identify the destination of the 1 Thessalonians 4:17 gathering as Heaven.

While Anglicans have many views, some Anglican commentators, such as N. T. Wright, identify the destination as a specific place on Earth. This interpretation may sometimes be connected to Christian environmentalist concerns.

== Views of eschatological timing ==
There are numerous views regarding the timing of the Rapture. Some maintain that Matthew 24:37–40 refers to the Rapture, pointing out similarities between the two texts, indicating that the Rapture would occur at the parousia of the Lord. Others point out that neither church nor rapture occur in Matthew 24 and there are significant differences between Matthew 24:37–40 and 1 Thessalonians 4:13–18. As a result, these two texts receive the overwhelming focus within discussions about the Rapture's timing. The two texts are as follows:

1 Thessalonians 4:15–17 ASV	Matthew 24:37–40 ASV
^{15}According to the Lord's word, we tell you that we who are still alive, who are left until the coming of the Lord (παρουσίαν, parousia), will certainly not precede those who have fallen asleep. ^{16}For the Lord himself will come down from heaven, with a loud command, with the voice of the archangel and with the trumpet call of God, and the dead in Christ will rise first. ^{17}After that, we who are still alive and are left will be caught up together with them in the clouds to meet the Lord in the air. And so we will be with the Lord forever.	^{37}And as were the days of Noah, so shall be the coming (παρουσία, parousia) of the Son of man. ^{38}For as in those days which were before the flood they were eating and drinking, marrying and giving in marriage, until the day that Noah entered into the ark, ^{39}and they knew not until the flood came, and took them all away; so shall be the coming (παρουσία parousia) of the Son of man. ^{40}Then shall two men be in the field; one is taken, and one is left.

Comparison of Christian millennial interpretations, including premillennialist, postmillennialist, and amillennialist viewpoints

Comparison of differing viewpoints amongst premillennialists about timing of tribulation

In the amillennial and postmillennial views there are no distinctions in the timing of the Rapture. These views regard that the Rapture, as it is described in 1 Thessalonians 4:15–17, would be identical to the Second Coming of Jesus as described in Matthew 24:29–31 after the spiritual/symbolic millennium.

In the premillennial view, the Rapture would be before a literal, earthly millennium. Within premillennialism, the pretribulation position distinguishes between the Rapture and the Second Coming as two different events. There are also other positions within premillennialism that differ with regard to the timing of the Rapture.

=== Premillennialist views ===
In the earliest days of the church, chiliastic teaching (i.e., early premillennialism) was the dominant view. Eusebius wrote, "To these [written accounts] belong his [Papias of Hierapolis] statement that there will be a period of some thousand years after the resurrection of the dead, and that the kingdom of Christ will be set up in the material form on this very earth. [...] But it was due to him that so many of the Church Fathers after him adopted a like opinion, urging in their own support the antiquity of the man; as for instance Irenaeus and anyone else that may have proclaimed similar views."

The 19th-century scholar Schaff notes that, "The most striking point in the eschatology of the ante-Nicene age is the prominent chiliasm, or millennarianism, that is the belief of a visible reign of Christ in glory on earth with the risen saints for a thousand years, before the general resurrection and judgment."

Over time, however, a clash surfaced between two schools of interpretation, the Antiochene and Alexandrian schools. The Alexandrian school's roots can be traced back to the influence of Philo, a Hellenized Jew who sought to reconcile God's veracity with what he thought were errors in the Tanakh. Alexandrian theologians viewed the Millennium as a symbolic reign of Christ from Heaven. Through the influence of Origen and Augustine—students of the Alexandrian school—allegorical interpretation rose to prominence, and its eschatology became the majority view for more than a thousand years. As a reaction to the rise of allegorical interpretation the Antiochene school insisted on a literal hermeneutic. but did little to counter the Alexandrian's symbolic Millennium.

In the twelfth century futurism became prominent again when Joachim of Fiore (1130–1202) wrote a commentary on Revelation and insisted that the end was near and taught that God would restore the earth, the Jews would be converted, and the Millennium would take place on earth. His teaching influenced much of Europe.

Though the Catholic Church does not generally regard Biblical prophecy in texts such as Daniel and Revelation as strictly future-based (when viewed from the standpoint of our present time), in 1590 Francisco Ribera, a Catholic Jesuit, taught futurism. He also taught that a gathering-of-the-elect event (similar to what is now called the rapture) would happen 45 days before the end of a 3.5-year tribulation.

The concept of the rapture, in connection with premillennialism, was expressed by the 17th-century American Puritans Increase Mather and Cotton Mather. They held to the idea that believers would be caught up in the air, followed by judgments on earth, and then the millennium. Other 17th-century expressions of the rapture are found in the works of Robert Maton, Nathaniel Holmes, John Browne, Thomas Vincent, Henry Danvers, and William Sherwin.

The term rapture was used by Philip Doddridge and John Gill in their New Testament commentaries, with the idea that believers would be caught up prior to judgment on earth and Jesus' second coming.

An 1828 edition of Matthew Henry's An Exposition of the Old and New Testament uses the word "rapture" in explicating 1 Thessalonians 4:17.

Although not using the term "rapture", the idea was more fully developed by Edward Irving (1792–1834). In 1825, Irving directed his attention to the study of prophecy and eventually accepted the one-man Antichrist idea of James Henthorn Todd, Samuel Roffey Maitland, Robert Bellarmine, and Francisco Ribera, yet he went a step further. Irving began to teach the idea of a two-phase return of Christ, the first phase being a secret rapture prior to the rise of the Antichrist. Edward Miller described Irving's teaching like this: "There are three gatherings: – First, of the first-fruits of the harvest, the wise virgins who follow the Lamb whithersoever He goeth; next, the abundant harvest gathered afterwards by God; and lastly, the assembling of the wicked for punishment."

==== Pretribulational premillennialism ====
The pretribulation position advocates that the rapture will occur before the beginning of a seven-year tribulation period, while the second coming will occur at the end of it. Pretribulationists often describe the rapture as Jesus coming for the church and the second coming as Jesus coming with the church. Pretribulation educators and preachers include Jimmy Swaggart, Robert Jeffress, J. Dwight Pentecost, Tim LaHaye, J. Vernon McGee, Perry Stone, Chuck Smith, Hal Lindsey, Jack Van Impe, Skip Heitzig, Chuck Missler, Grant Jeffrey, Thomas Ice, David Jeremiah, John F. MacArthur, and John Hagee.

John Nelson Darby first solidified and popularized the pretribulation rapture in 1827. Despite vague notions of this view existing in a few Puritan theologians prior to Darby, he was the first person to place it into a larger theological framework . This view was accepted among many other Plymouth Brethren movements in England. Darby and other prominent Brethren were part of the Brethren movement which impacted American Christianity, especially with movements and teachings associated with Christian eschatology and fundamentalism, primarily through their writings. Influences included the Bible Conference Movement, starting in 1878 with the Niagara Bible Conference. These conferences, which were initially inclusive of historicist and futurist premillennialism, led to an increasing acceptance of futurist premillennial views and the pretribulation rapture especially among Presbyterian, Baptist, and Congregational members. Popular books also contributed to acceptance of the pretribulation rapture, including William E. Blackstone's book Jesus is Coming, published in 1878, which sold more than 1.3 million copies, and the Scofield Reference Bible, published in 1909 and 1919 and revised in 1967.

Some pretribulation proponents, such as Grant Jeffrey, maintain that the earliest known extra-Biblical reference to the pretribulation rapture is from a 7th-century tract known as the Apocalypse of Pseudo-Ephraem the Syrian. Different authors have proposed several different versions of the text as authentic and there are differing opinions as to whether it supports belief in a pretribulation rapture. One version of the text reads, "For all the saints and Elect of God are gathered, prior to the tribulation that is to come, and are taken to the Lord lest they see the confusion that is to overwhelm the world because of our sins."

There exists at least one 18th-century and two 19th-century pretribulation references: in an essay published in 1788 in Philadelphia by the Baptist Morgan Edwards which articulated the concept of a pretribulation rapture, in the writings of Catholic priest Manuel Lacunza in 1812, and by John Nelson Darby in 1827. Manuel Lacunza (1731–1801), a Jesuit priest (under the pseudonym Juan Josafat Ben Ezra), wrote an apocalyptic work entitled La venida del Mesías en gloria y majestad (The Coming of the Messiah in Glory and Majesty). The book appeared first in 1811, 10 years after his death. In 1827, it was translated into English by the Scottish minister Edward Irving.

During the 1970s, belief in the rapture became popular in wider circles, in part because of the books of Hal Lindsey, including The Late Great Planet Earth, which has reportedly sold between 15 million and 35 million copies, and the movie A Thief in the Night, which based its title on the scriptural reference 1 Thessalonians 5:2. Lindsey proclaimed that the rapture was imminent, based on world conditions at the time.

In 1995, the doctrine of the pretribulation rapture was further popularized by Tim LaHaye's Left Behind series of books, which sold close to 80 million copies and was made into several movies and four real-time strategy video games.

According to Thomas Ice a belief in the imminence of Christ's return, key to modern pretribulation theology, can be found in various Church Fathers and early Christian writings.

==== Midtribulational premillennialism ====
The mid-tribulation position espouses that the rapture will occur at some point in the middle of what is popularly called the tribulation period, or during Daniel's 70th Week. The tribulation is typically divided into two periods of 3.5 years each. Midtribulationists hold that the saints will go through the first period (Beginning of Travail) but will be raptured into Heaven before the severe outpouring of God's wrath in the second half of what is popularly called the Great Tribulation. Midtribulationists appeal to Daniel 7:25 which says the saints will be given over to tribulation for "time, times, and half a time," – interpreted to mean 3.5 years. At the halfway point of the tribulation, the Antichrist will commit the "abomination of desolation" by desecrating the Jerusalem temple. Midtribulationist teachers include Harold Ockenga, James O. Buswell (a reformed, Calvinistic Presbyterian), and Norman Harrison. This position is a minority view among premillennialists.

==== Prewrath premillennialism ====
The prewrath rapture view also places the rapture at some time during the tribulation period before the second coming. This view holds that the tribulation of the church begins toward the latter part of a seven-year period, being Daniel's 70th week, when the Antichrist is revealed in the temple. This latter half of a seven-year period [i.e. 3 1/2 years] is defined as the great tribulation, although the exact duration is not known. References from Matthew 24, Mark 13, and Luke 21 are used as evidence that this tribulation will be cut short by the coming of Christ to deliver the righteous by means of the rapture, which will occur after specific events in Revelation, in particular after the sixth seal is opened and the sun is darkened and the moon is turned to blood. However, by this point many Christians will have been slaughtered as martyrs by the Antichrist. After the rapture will come God's seventh-seal wrath of trumpets and bowls (a.k.a. "the Day of the Lord"). The Day of the Lord's wrath against the ungodly will follow during the remainder of the seventh year.

==== Partial rapture premillennialism ====
The partial, conditional or selective rapture theory holds that all obedient Christians will be raptured before the great tribulation, depending on one's personal fellowship (or closeness) between her or him and God, which is not to be confused with the relationship between the same and God (which is believer, regardless of fellowship). Therefore, it is believed by some that the rapture of a believer is determined by the timing of his conversion before the great tribulation. Other proponents of this theory hold that only those who are faithful in their relationship with God (having true fellowship with him) will be raptured, and the rest resurrected during the great tribulation, between the 5th and 6th seals of Revelation, having lost their lives during. Still others hold the rest will either be raptured during the tribulation or at its end. As stated by Ira David (a proponent of this view): "The saints will be raptured in groups during the tribulation as they are prepared to go." Some notable proponents of this theory are G. H. Lang, Robert Chapman, G. H. Pember, Robert Govett, D. M. Panton, Watchman Nee, Ira E. David, J. A. Seiss, Hudson Taylor, Anthony Norris Groves, John Wilkinson, G. Campbell Morgan, Otto Stockmayer and Rev. J. W. (Chip) White Jr.

==== Posttribulational premillennialism ====
In the posttribulation premillennial position, the rapture would be identical to the second coming of Jesus or as a meeting in the air with Jesus that immediately precedes his return to the Earth before a literal millennium. The posttribulation position places the rapture at the end of the tribulation period. Posttribulation writers define the tribulation period in a generic sense as the entire present age, or in a specific sense of a period of time preceding the second coming of Christ. The emphasis in this view is that the church will undergo the tribulation. Matthew 24:29–31 – "Immediately after the Tribulation of those days ... they shall gather together his elect ..." – is cited as a foundational scripture for this view. Posttribulationists perceive the rapture as occurring simultaneously with the second coming of Christ. Upon Jesus's return, believers will meet him in the air and will then accompany him in his return to the Earth.

In the Epistles of Paul, most notably in 1 Thessalonians 4:16–17 ("the dead in Christ shall rise first") and 1 Corinthians 15:51–52, a trumpet is described as blowing at the end of the tribulation to herald the return of Christ; Revelation 11:15 further supports this view. Moreover, after chapters 6–19, and after 20:1–3 when Satan is bound, Revelation 20:4–6 says, "and they lived, and reigned with Christ a thousand years. But the rest of the dead lived not again until the thousand years were finished. This is the first resurrection. Blessed and holy is he that hath part in the first resurrection."

Authors and teachers who support the posttribulational view include Pat Robertson, Walter R. Martin, John Piper, George E. Ladd, Robert H. Gundry, and Douglas Moo.

=== Postmillennialism ===
In the postmillennialist view the millennium is seen as an indefinitely long time thus precluding literal interpretation of a thousand-year period. According to Loraine Boettner "the world will be Christianized, and the return of Christ will occur at the close of a long period of righteousness and peace, commonly called the millennium." Postmillennialists commonly view the rapture of the Church as one and the same event as the second coming of Christ. According to them the great tribulation was already fulfilled in the Jewish–Roman War of AD 66–73 that involved the destruction of Jerusalem. Authors who have expressed support for this view include the Puritan John Bunyan of Pilgrim's Progress, Congregationalist theologian Jonathan Edwards, and Second Great Awakening figure Charles Finney.

=== Amillennialism ===
Amillennialists view the millennial rule of Christ as the current, but indefinite period that began with the foundation of the church and that will end with the Second Coming—a period where Christ already reigns with his saints through the Eucharist and his church. They view the life of the church as Christ's kingdom already established (inaugurated on the day of the Pentecost described in the first chapter of Acts), but not to be made complete until his second coming. This framework precludes a literal interpretation of the thousand-year period mentioned in chapter twenty of Revelation, viewing the number "thousand" as numerologically symbolic and pertaining to the current age of the church.

Amillennialists generally do not use "rapture" as a theological term, but they do view a similar event coinciding with the second coming—primarily as a mystical gathering with Christ. To amillennialists the final days already began on the day of the Pentecost, but that the great tribulation will occur during the final phase or conclusion of the millennium, with Christ then returning as the alpha and omega at the end of time. Unlike premillennialists who predict the millennium as a literal thousand-year reign by Christ after his return, amillennialists emphasize the continuity and permanency of his reign throughout all periods of the New Covenant, past, present and future. They do not regard mentions of Jerusalem in the chapter twenty-one of Revelation as pertaining to the present geographical city, but to a future new Jerusalem or "new heaven and new earth", for which the church through the twelve apostles (representing of the twelve tribes of Israel) currently lays the foundation in the messianic kingdom already present. Unlike certain premillennial dispensationalists, they do not view the rebuilding of the temple of Jerusalem as either necessary or legitimate, because the practice of animal sacrifices has now been fulfilled in the life of the church through Christ's ultimate sacrifice on the cross. Authors who have expressed support for the amillennialist view include St. Augustine. The amillennialist viewpoint is the position held by the Catholic, Eastern Orthodox, and Anglican churches, as well as mainline Protestant bodies, such as Lutherans, Methodists, Presbyterians and many Reformed congregations.

=== Preterist Rapture ===
This view, associated with Victorian Congregationalist J. Stuart Russell is that the rapture already occurred in the lifetime of the St John, leaving an empty husk institution: the Christian church was not restored until the Reformation.

== Date ==
Since the origin of the concept, some believers have made predictions regarding the date of the event. All have failed in their attempt to set a date.

=== Failed predictions ===
Notable predictions of the date of the Second Coming of Jesus, which may or may not refer to the rapture, include the following:

- 1843 and 1844: William Miller predicted that Christ would return between 21 March 1843 and 21 March 1844, then revised his prediction, claiming to have miscalculated the Bible, to 22 October 1844. The realization that the predictions were incorrect resulted in the Great Disappointment. Miller's theology gave rise to the Advent movement, which later on gave birth to the Seventh-day Adventist Church. Followers of the Baháʼí Faith believe that Christ did return as Miller predicted in 1844, with the advent of the Báb, and numerous Miller-like prophetic predictions from many religions are given in William Sears's book, Thief in The Night.
- 1914, 1918, and 1925: Various dates were predicted for the Second Coming of Jesus by Charles Taze Russell, the founder of the Watch Tower Society, and many of his successors heading his Bible Students Association, which was later renamed the Jehovah's Witnesses.

Predictions of the date of the rapture include the following:

- 1981: Chuck Smith predicted that Jesus would probably return by 1981.
- 1988: Edgar C. Whisenant published a book called 88 Reasons Why the Rapture Will Be in 1988.
- 1994-09-06: Radio evangelist Harold Camping predicted 6 September 1994.
- 2011-05-21: Harold Camping's revised prediction put 21 May 2011 as the date of the rapture. After this date passed without apparent incident, Camping made a radio broadcast stating that a non-visible "spiritual judgement" had indeed taken place, and that the physical rapture would occur on 21 October 2011. On that date, according to Camping, the "whole world will be destroyed."
- 2017-09-23: Christian numerologist David Meade based this prediction on astrological theories.
- 2025-09-23/24: Predicted by Joshua Mhlakela.

== See also ==
- Bible prophecy
- Covenant theology – Protestant biblical interpretive framework
- Enoch – Biblical figure prior to Noah's flood
- Eschatology of Jehovah's Witnesses – Jehovah's Witnesses beliefs regarding the end of the world
- Number of the beast – Number associated with the Beast of Revelation
- Preterism – Christian eschatological view
- Rapture anxiety
- Spirit away – English expression for the concept of Kamikakushi in Japanese folklore
- The Leftovers (TV series) – American series in which a rapture-like event occurs
- Unfulfilled Christian religious predictions
