= Book of Nepos =

3rd-century Christian text by an Egyptian bishop

The Book of Nepos was a 3rd-century Christian text written by an Egyptian bishop of Arsinoe named Nepos, which advocated for a strictly literal interpretation of the Bible, thus against allegorical readings. This included especially a literal reading of the Book of Revelation, a minority position at the time.

The Book of Nepos no longer exists and is considered lost. It is known only indirectly through Eusebius, who quoted a work by Pope Dionysius of Alexandria criticizing Nepos.

Nepos was a strict literalist (believing the entire Bible is true in a literal sense). His text, also known as the Refutation of the Allegorisers (or Refutation of the Allegorists) was aimed at refuting the arguments of those who held that certain sections of the Bible were mere allegory. In particular, the text is aimed at discrediting the then dominant position that the book of Revelation should be interpreted allegorically rather than literally.

Amongst the teachings in the text is the belief that Jesus would come to earth and physically reign as monarch for 1000 years during an age of righteous delight. This belief was regarded as fairly orthodox in the early church (e.g. it was held by Irenaeus, and Justin Martyr), however, the later church came to view Revelation as more allegorical. The dispute with Nepos, as found in Eusebius is in fact, the first instance of premillennialism ever being refuted. Pope Dionysius felt moved to write a text (On the Promises) against it, although he regarded Nepos highly and attempted to criticize the doctrine without insulting Nepos personally.

The Book of Nepos was so popular within the villages around Alexandria that Dionysius went there in person to refute it. In deference to Nepos and the prior orthodoxy of strict literalism, he did so politely, entering a respectful dialogue with those from the village and contesting each of the arguments they took from the Book of Nepos in turn.

The refutation Dionysius offered was based on the notion that John was not the author of the Book of Revelation, popularly attributed to him. It was based on stylistic differences between the Gospels and epistles thought to be of John. Eusebius himself described the interpretation of Nepos as advocating that the Divine Scriptures be "understood in a more Jewish manner."

The followers of Nepos were called Nepotians.
