= Nathaniel Holmes (theologian) =

English Independent theologian and preacher

Nathaniel Holmes or Homes (Note: Also Nathanael.) (1599–1678) was an English Independent theologian and preacher. He has been described as a “Puritan writer of great ability".

== Life ==
He graduated with a B.A. from Exeter College, Oxford in 1620; and with an M.A. from Magdalen Hall, Oxford in 1623. He later founded an Independent church, with Henry Burton; he was rector of St Mary Staining, Oat Lane, Aldersgate, in London to 1662. In 1644 his Gospell-Musick defended and promoted psalm-singing, and reprinted the preface to the Bay Psalm Book.

A convinced millenarian, he preached to the House of Commons in 1641, under the influence of Thomas Brightman. In 1650, in another sermon to the Commons after the battle of Dunbar, he cited the Book of Daniel and Book of Revelation. He has been considered a follower of Johann Heinrich Alsted.

He with Henry Jessey corresponded with Menasseh ben Israel, about the official return of Jews to England, and the supposed Lost Tribes found in North America. This interest was prompted by John Dury’s interest, and was shared with others. His philo-Semitism has been noted, for example, by Werner Sombart.

== Views ==
His 1640 work on usury was against the permissive line of William Ames. He was against political "levelling". He defended infant baptism, and attacked John Goodwin on salvation by works.

He wrote against witchcraft, proposing an influential three-fold scheme of possession, and astrology, regretting its prevalence.

== Works ==
- Usury is Injury (1640), OCLC 55196276
- Gospell Musick (1644)
- Daemonologie and Theologie (1650)
- The Resurrection Revealed, or The Dawning of the Day Star
- Some Glimpses of Israel's Call Approaching
- Revelation Revealed (1653)
- Commentary on Canticles
