= Francisco Ribera de Villacastín =

Spanish theologian (1537–1591)

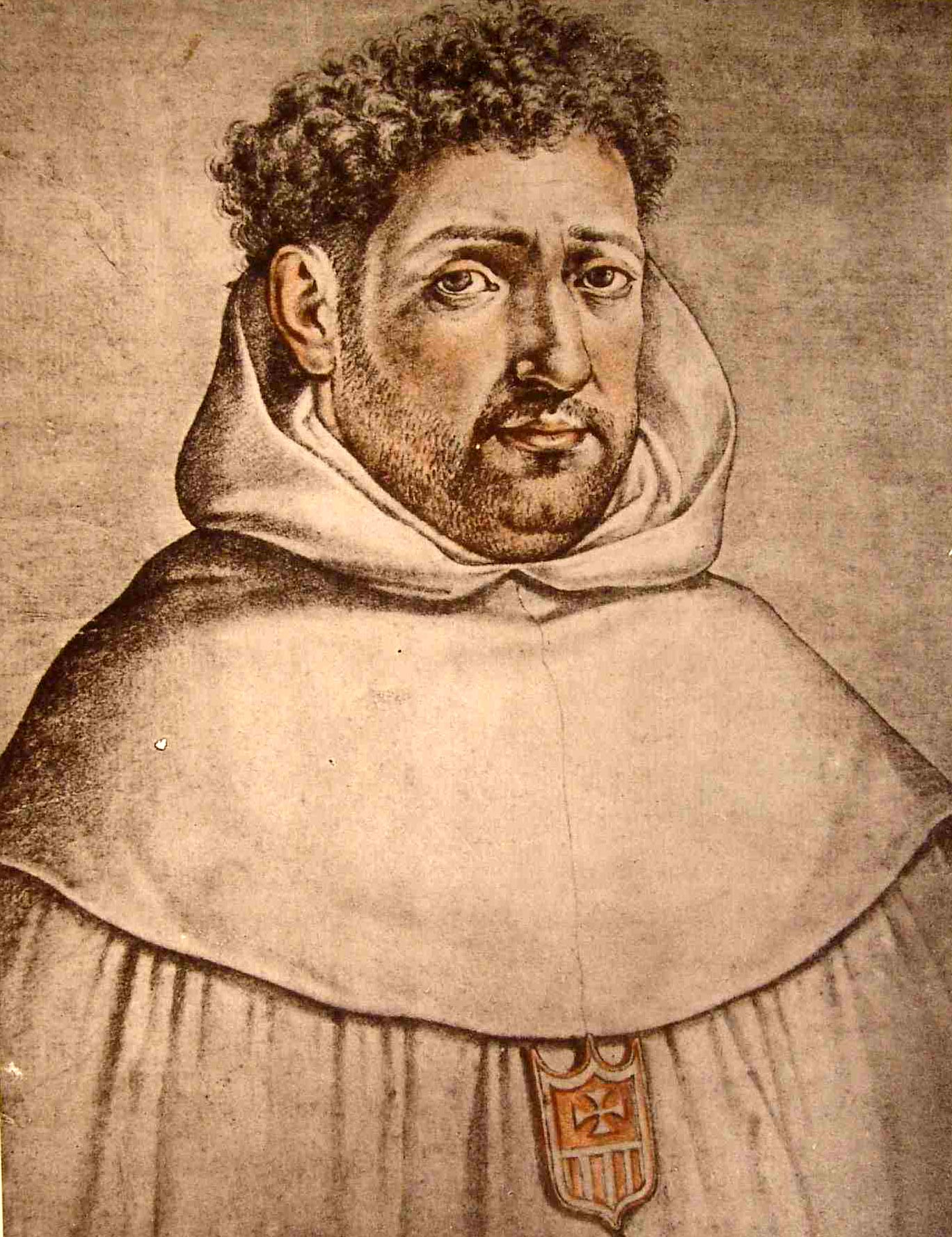

Francisco Ribera de Villacastín, SJ (1537–1591) was a Spanish Jesuit theologian, identified with the futurist Christian eschatological view.

== Life ==
Ribera was born at Villacastín. He joined the Society of Jesus in 1570, and taught at the University of Salamanca. He acted as confessor to Teresa of Avila. He died in 1591 at the age of fifty-four, one year after the publication of his work In Sacrum Beati Ioannis Apostoli, & Evangelistiae Apocalypsin Commentarii.

== Works ==
Apocalypse commentary

In the late Middle Ages and the Protestant Reformation, some commentators sought to identify the Antichrist with the Pope, so that figures from the Book of Revelation might not only be interpreted as representing figures in the past (such as the Emperor Nero) or in the future (in the Last Days), but also in the present. Ribera in 1585 began writing a 500-page commentary on the Book of Revelation, titled In Sacrum Beati Ioannis Apostoli, & Evangelistiae Apocalypsin Commentarii, proposing that the first chapters of the Apocalypse applied to ancient pagan Rome, and the rest referred to a yet future period of 3½ literal years, immediately prior to the second coming. During that time, many, he said, would have fallen away from the Catholic Church into apostasy. Then, he proposed, the Antichrist, a single individual, would:

- Persecute and blaspheme the saints of God
- Rebuild the temple in Jerusalem
- Outlaw the Catholic Christian religion
- Deny Jesus Christ
- Destroy Rome
- Be received by the Jews
- Pretend to be God
- Kill the two witnesses of God
- Conquer the world.

To accomplish this, Ribera understood the 1260 days and 42 months and 3½ times of prophecy literally, rejecting an interpretation as 1260 years.

Other works

- Vida de la madre Teresa de Jesús (1590), a work of hagiography.
- In epistolam B. Pauli apostoli ad Hebraeos commentarii (1600).

== Futurism ==
In the context of interpreting eschatological writings, futurism is the position that the Book of Revelation refers not primarily to the ancient context in which it was written, or to events that have already passed, but rather predicts future events in a period immediately prior to the Second Coming. The Dictionary of Premillennial Theology (1997) states that Ribera was an Augustinian amillennialist, whose form of futurism proposed that only the introductory chapters of Revelation referred to ancient Rome, and the remainder referred to a literal three and half years at the end of time. His interpretation was then followed by Robert Bellarmine and the Spanish Dominican Thomas Malvenda.

Thomas Brightman, in particular, writing in the early 17th century as an English Protestant, contested Ribera's views. He argued that the use of the Vulgate invalidated Catholic commentary on the Book of Revelation, and proposed an alternative historicist point of view.
