= Thomas Ice =

American theologian and author

Thomas Ice is an American theologian and author of books on biblical prophecy.

== Education and career ==
Ice received his BA from Howard Payne University in 1975, his masters in theology from Dallas Theological Seminary in 1981, and a PhD from Tyndale Theological Seminary in 1995. He performed post-doctoral studies in church history at the University of Wales.

Ice is a proponent of dispensational premillennialism. He was the executive director of the Pre-Trib Research Center on the campus of Liberty University in Lynchburg, Virginia. The research center was founded in 1994 by Tim LaHaye and Ice to research, teach, proclaim, and defend pre-tribulationism. The center currently sponsors prophecy meetings and conferences and provides speakers for the purpose of discussion and lecture on the topic of pre-tribulationism.

Ice has taught at Liberty University. He moved to Calvary University in 2018. He lives in Lee's Summit, Missouri, with his wife Janice.

== Selected books ==
- House, H. Wayne; Ice, Thomas (1988). Dominion Theology, Blessing or Curse?. Portland, Oregon: Multnomah Press. ISBN 0-88070-261-3.
- Ice, Thomas; Dean, Robert Jr. (1990). A Holy Rebellion: A Strategy for Spiritual Warfare. Eugene, Oregon: Harvest House Publishers. ISBN 0-89081-805-3.
- ———; Price, J. Randall (1992). Ready to Rebuild: The Imminent Plan to Rebuild the Last Days Temple. Eugene, Oregon: Harvest House. ISBN 0-89081-956-4.
- ———; Demy, Timothy, eds. (1995). When the Trumpet Sounds: Today's Foremost Authorities Speak Out on End-Time Controversy. Eugene, Oregon: Harvest House Publishers. ISBN 1-56507-313-4.
- ———; Demy, Timothy (1998). Prophecy Watch. Eugene, Oregon: Harvest House Publishers. ISBN 1-56507-685-0.
- ———; Gentry, Kenneth L. Jr (1999). The Great Tribulation, Past or Future? Two Evangelicals Debate the Question. Grand Rapids, Michigan: Kregel Publications. ISBN 0-8254-2901-3.
- LaHaye, Tim; ——— (2001). Charting the End Times: A Visual Guide to Understanding Bible Prophecy. Harvest House Publishers. ISBN 978-0-7369-0138-3.
- LaHaye, Tim; ———, eds. (2003). The End Times Controversy: The Second Coming Under Attack. Eugene, Oregon: Harvest House Publishers. ISBN 0-7369-0953-2.
- ——— (2017). The Case for Zionism: Why Christians Should Support Israel. New Leaf Publishing Group. ISBN 978-1-61458-062-1.
