= Thomas Brightman =

English clergyman and biblical commentator

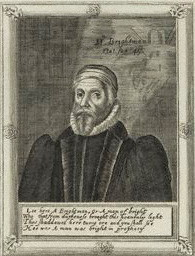
- Born: 1562; Nottingham, England
- Died: August 24, 1607 (aged 44/45)
- Education: Queens' College, Cambridge
- Occupations: Clergyman and biblical commentator

Thomas Brightman (1562–August 24, 1607) was an English clergyman and biblical commentator. His exegesis of the Book of Revelation, published posthumously, proved influential. According to William M. Lamont, Brightman and Joseph Mede were the two most important revisionists of the interpretation and eschatology set down by John Foxe; among Brightman's contributions was to weaken the imperial associations tied to the Emperor Constantine I. The detailed reading, in favour of the Genevan and Scottish churches, and condemning the 'Laodicean' (lukewarm) Church of England, helped to move on the Puritan conceptions of church reform and its urgency.

== Life ==
Brightman was born at Nottingham in 1562, and admitted a pensioner at Queens' College, Cambridge, in 1576, where he became Fellow in 1584. He graduated B.A. in 1581, M.A. in 1584, B.D, in 1591. In 1592. on the recommendation of William Whitaker, John Osborne gave him the rectory of Hawnes in Bedfordshire. Brightman frequently discussed in his college church ceremonies with George Meriton, afterwards dean of York. As a preacher he was celebrated, though his disaffection from the church establishment was no secret. It is said that he subscribed the Book of Discipline.

His life, says Thomas Fuller, was most angelical. He used to carry a Greek testament, which he read over every two weeks.

Riding on a coach with John Osborne, and reading a book (for he would lose no time), he fainted, and died, on 24 August 1607. He was buried, according to the parish register, on the day of his death at Hawnes. There is an inscription to him in the chancel. He was never married. His funeral sermon was preached by Edward Bulkley, D.D., sometime fellow of St. John's College, Cambridge, and rector of Odell in Bedfordshire.

== Works ==
Brightman persuaded himself and others that a work of his on the Apocalypse was written under divine inspiration. In it he makes the Church of England the Laodicean church, and the angel that God loved the church of Geneva and the kirk of Scotland. The main object of his system of prophecy in a commentary on Daniel, as well as in his book on the Apocalypse, was to prove that the pope is that anti-Christ, whose reign is limited to 1290 years, and who is then foredoomed by God to utter destruction.

In 1615 his work Shall They Return to Jerusalem Again? was published, advocating the return of the Jews to the Holy Land, one of the first Christians to do so. "There is nothing more certain: the prophets do everywhere confirm it and beat upon it." Making him a proto-zionist.
