= Great Tribulation =

Calamitous end times period as found in the Synoptic Gospels

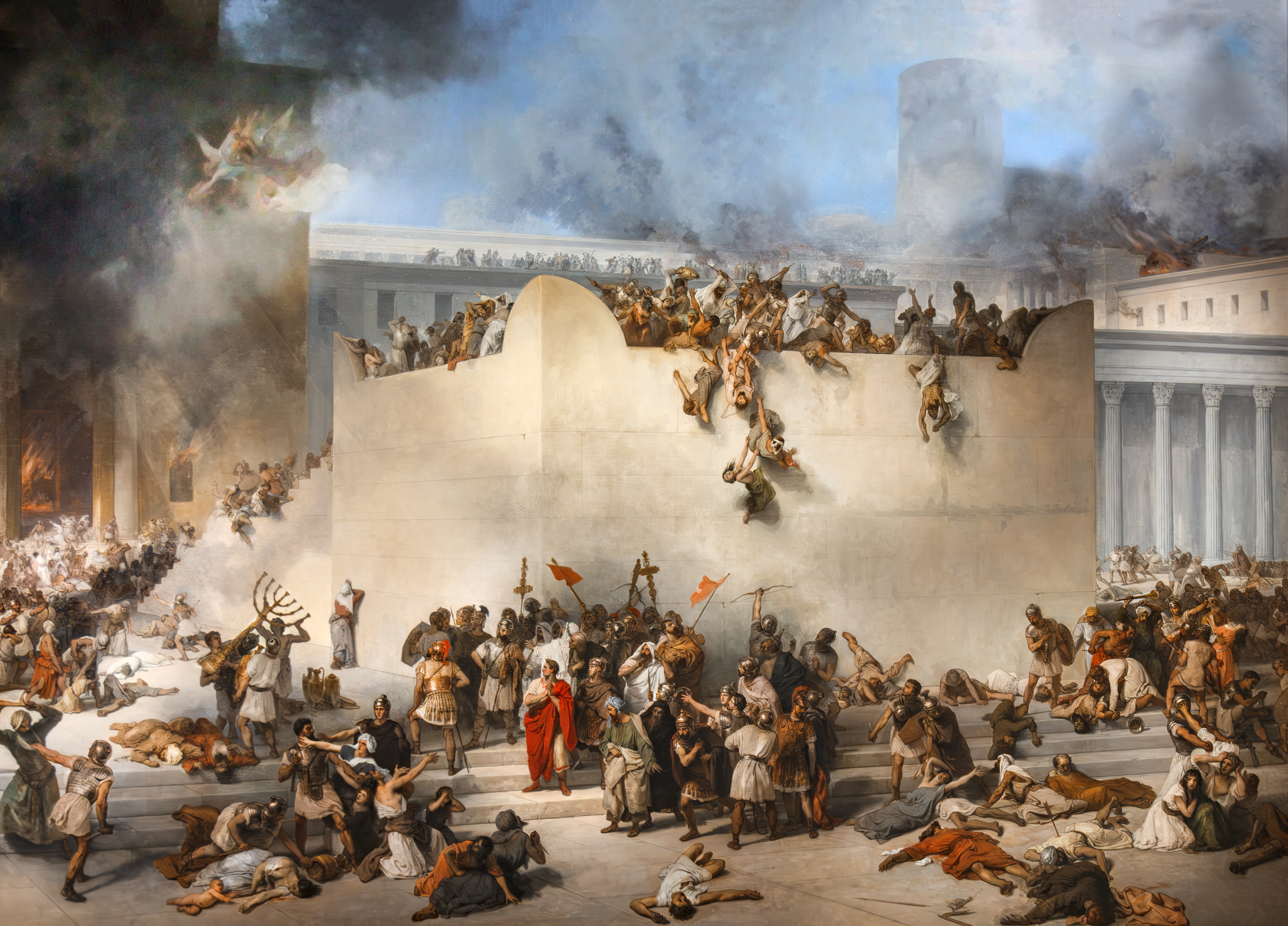
The Siege of Jerusalem in 70 AD is interpreted by some theologians, particularly preterists, as the fulfilling of some events predicted by Jesus in the Olivet Discourse.

In Christian eschatology, the Great Tribulation (Ancient Greek: θλῖψις μεγάλη, romanized: thlîpsis megálē) is a period mentioned by Jesus in the Olivet Discourse as a sign that would occur in the time of the end.

At Revelation 7:14, "the Great Tribulation" (Ancient Greek: τῆς θλῑ́ψεως τῆς μεγάλης, romanized: tês thlī́pseōs tês megálēs, lit. 'the great tribulation') is used to indicate the period spoken of by Jesus. Matthew 24:21, 29 uses tribulation (θλίβω) in a context denoting afflictions of those hard-pressed by siege and the calamities of war.

== Etymology ==
The term "Great Tribulation" occurs four times in the New Testament: Matthew 24:21, Acts 7:11, Revelation 2:22, and Revelation 7:14. Some take the words of Jesus in Matthew 24:21 to be describing a period of intense persecution and tribulation at the end of the age, prior to Jesus's return.

== Views ==
Christians disagree over whether the Tribulation will be a relatively short period of great hardship before the end of the world and Second Coming of Christ (a school of thought sometimes called "Futurism"); or has already occurred, having happened in AD 70 when Roman legions laid siege to Jerusalem and destroyed its temple (sometimes called Preterism); or began in 538 AD when papal Rome came to power—popes being anti-Christs—and will intensify shortly before the end of the world, (sometimes called "Historicism").

=== Futurism ===
In the futurist view of Christian eschatology, the Great Tribulation is a relatively short period of time where everyone will experience worldwide hardships, persecution, disasters, famine, war, pain, and suffering, which will affect all of creation, and precede judgment of all when the Second Coming takes place. Some pretribulationists believe that those who choose to follow God will be raptured before the tribulation, and thus escape it. On the other hand, posttribulationists believe Christians who are alive at the time of the Great Tribulation must endure the Great Tribulation and will receive great blessings.

According to dispensationalists, the Tribulation is thought to occur before the Second Coming of Jesus and during the End Times. In this view, the Tribulation will last seven prophetic Hebrew years (lasting 360 days each) in all, but the Great Tribulation will be the second half of the Tribulation period.

In this view, this seven-year period is considered to be the final week of Daniel's Prophecy of Seventy Weeks, found in Daniel chapter 9. It is theorized that each week represents seven years, with the timetable beginning from Artaxerxes' order to rebuild the Second Temple in Jerusalem. After seven weeks and 62 weeks, the prophecy says that the messiah will be "cut off", which is taken to correspond to the death of Christ. This is seen as creating a break of indeterminate length in the timeline, with one week remaining to be fulfilled.

The time period for these beliefs is also based on other passages: in the Book of Daniel, "time, times, and half a time", interpreted as "three and a half years," and the Book of Revelation, "a thousand two hundred and threescore days" and "forty and two months" (the prophetic month averaging 30 days, hence 1260/30 = 42 months or 3.5 years). The 1290 days of Daniel 12:11, (rather than the 1260 days of Revelation 11:3), is thought to be the result of either a simple intercalary leap month adjustment, or due to further calculations related to the prophecy, or due to an intermediate stage of time that is to prepare the world for the beginning of the millennial reign.

==== Events ====
Among Futurists there are differing views about what will happen to Christians during the Tribulation:

- Pretribulationists believe that all righteous Christians (deceased and living) will be taken bodily up to Heaven (called the Rapture) before the Tribulation begins. According to this belief, every true Christian that has ever existed throughout the course of the entire Christian era will be instantaneously transformed into a perfect resurrected body, and will thus escape the trials of the Tribulation. Those who become Christians after the rapture will live through (or perish during) the Tribulation. After the Tribulation, Christ will return to establish his Millennial Kingdom.
- Prewrathers believe the rapture will occur during the Tribulation, at some unknown time in the second half of the 70th week of Daniel, but before the seven trumpets and seven bowls of the wrath of God. Thus the rapture cuts short the Tribulation and initiates the wrath of God.
- Midtribulationists believe that the rapture will occur halfway through the Tribulation, but before the worst part of it occurs. The seven-year period is divided into halves—the "beginning of sorrows" and the "Great Tribulation".
- Posttribulationists believe that Christians will not be taken up into Heaven for eternity, but will be received or gathered in the air by Christ, to descend together to establish the Kingdom of God on earth at the end of the Tribulation.

In pretribulationism and midtribulationism, the rapture and the Second Coming of Christ are separate events, while in post-tribulationism the two events are identical or simultaneous. Another feature of the pre- and mid-tribulation beliefs is the idea that after the rapture, Christ will return for a third time (when also counting the first coming) to set up his kingdom on the earth.

The Catechism of the Catholic Church mentions a "final trial that will shake the faith of many believers" led by the Antichrist before the final parousia (Second Coming). Generally neither the Catholic Church, the various Orthodox and Anglican communions, nor the older Protestant denominations use the term "rapture", and tend toward amillennialism. In this view, the millennium is regarded as the initial period of Christ's reign (manifested in the life and activity of the church) that began with the Pentecost and will lead up to the messiah's eventual return, with the outcome being a single and permanent event at the end of present time.

=== Preterism ===
In the Preterist view, the Tribulation took place in the past when Roman legions destroyed Jerusalem and its temple in AD 70 during the end stages of the First Jewish–Roman War, and it only affected the Jewish people rather than all mankind.

Christian preterists believe that the Tribulation was a divine judgment visited upon the Jews for their sins, including rejection of Jesus as the promised Messiah. It occurred entirely in the past, around AD 70 when the armed forces of the Roman Empire destroyed Jerusalem and its temple.

A preterist discussion of the Tribulation has its focus on the Gospels, in particular the prophetic passages in Matthew 24, Mark 13 and Luke 21, rather than on the Apocalypse or Book of Revelation. (Preterists apply much of the symbolism in the Revelation to Rome, the Cæsars, and their persecution of Christians, rather than to the Tribulation upon the Jews.)

Jesus' warning in Matthew 24:34 that "this generation shall not pass, till all these things be fulfilled" is tied back to his similar warning to the Scribes and the Pharisees that their judgment would "come upon this generation", that is, during the first century rather than at a future time long after the Scribes and Pharisees had died. The destruction in AD 70 occurred within a 40-year generation from the time when Jesus gave that discourse.

The judgment on the Jewish nation was executed by the Roman legions, "the abomination of desolation, spoken of by Daniel the prophet."

Since Matthew 24 begins with Jesus visiting the Jerusalem Temple and pronouncing that "there shall not be left here one stone upon another, that shall not be thrown down" (vs. 3), preterists see nothing in Scripture to indicate that another Jewish temple will ever be built. The prophecies were all fulfilled on the then-existing temple that Jesus spoke about and that was subsequently destroyed within that generation.

=== Historicism ===
The Historicist view applies Tribulation to the period known as "persecution of the saints" (Daniel 7, Revelation 13). This is believed to have begun with the period after the "falling away" when papal Rome came to power for 1260 years from 538 to 1798 (using the day-year principle). They believe that the Tribulation is not a future event, but it intensifies right at the end to a time such as never before. Matthew's reference to "Great Tribulation" as parallel to Revelation 6:12-13, will reach a point that if it was not shortened even the just would not survive.

Historicists are prone to see prophecy fulfilled down through the centuries and rather than a single Antichrist to rule the earth during a future Tribulation period, Martin Luther, John Calvin and the other Protestant Reformers saw the Antichrist as fulfilled in the papacy. The reformers like Martin Luther, John Calvin and others saw the papacy's claim of temporal power over all secular governments and the autocratic character of the papal office as the falling away from the original faith founded by Jesus and the apostles, and challenged papal authority as it had deviated from scripture with its tradition and was a corruption from the early church.

Similarly, some modern historicists see the Tribulation on the Jews as beginning in AD 70 and continuing for centuries, covering the same time span as "the times of the Gentiles" during which "Jerusalem shall be trodden down by the Gentiles." This view would have it encompass not only the death of a million Jews at the hands of the Roman legions, but also the death of six million Jews in the Holocaust.

== See also ==
- Christian eschatology
