= List of eschatological topics =

The following topics pertain to eschatology, a part of theology, physics, philosophy and futurology concerned with what are believed to be the final events of human history, the ultimate destiny of humanity — commonly referred to as the "end of the world" or "end time".

== Interreligious ==
- Apocalypticism
- The Last Judgment
- Millenarianism
- Resurrection of the Dead
- Messianic Age
- The World to Come
- List of dates predicted for apocalyptic events

== Abrahamic ==
- Gog and Magog
- Kingdom of God

=== Christianity ===
- Christian eschatology
  - Futurism (Christianity)
  - Historicism (Christianity)
  - Idealism (Christian eschatology)
  - Preterism
  - Inaugurated eschatology
  - Eternal life (Christianity)
- Second Coming of Christ
- The New Earth
- Apocalypse, concept in the New Testament, referring to the final revelation
- Armageddon, site of an epic battle associated with end time prophecies
- Millennialism
  - Amillennialism
  - Postmillennialism
  - Premillennialism

=== Islam ===
- Islamic eschatology

=== Judaism ===
- Jewish eschatology
- Jewish messianism
- Third Temple

== Buddhism ==
- Buddhist eschatology
- Maitreya

== Hinduism ==
- Hindu eschatology
- Kalki
- Kali Yuga

== Zoroastrianism ==
- Frashokereti
- Saoshyant

== Futurology ==
- Global catastrophe scenarios
- Technological singularity and the intelligence explosion
- Ultimate fate of the universe

== Other ==
- Li Hong (Taoist eschatology)
- Ragnarök
