= Eschatology (disambiguation) =

Eschatology is a part of theology and philosophy concerned with the final events when the world ends.

Eschatology can also mean:

- Eschatology (book), a book by Pope Benedict XVI
- Eschatology (religious movement), an early 20th-century religious movement created by William W. Walter

== See also ==
- End time (disambiguation)
