= Max King =

Max King may refer to:

- Max King (theologian) (born 1930), founder of the school of thought known as Transmillennialism
- Max King (runner) (born 1980), American ultramarathon runner, winner of the 2014 IAU 100km World Championships
- Max King (rugby league) (born 1997), Professional rugby league footballer
- Max King (footballer) (born 2000), Australian rules footballer
- Max King (Emmerdale), fictional character on the British TV soap opera Emmerdale
