= Pantelism =

Pantelism is a variant of Christian eschatology that holds that the plan of God has been completed both prophetically and redemptively.

Pantelism has a similar "inclusive" approach to that of transmillennialism. Pantelism is an extension of Preterism. The difference from preterism is that pantelism views Israel's prophesied redemption in Christ as the catalyst for mankind's restoration to God.

== History ==
=== Etymology ===
The term "pantelism" comes from the Greek παντελής "all accomplished," and means "all things having been accomplished".

== Belief system ==
Some Christians view people being as "born lost," while others would say merely that each person sins; they must therefore profess personal faith in Jesus Christ to escape judgment when they die. The majority of Christians hold the modern traditional viewpoint about Hell as the final abode of the wicked. Although some preterists accept Hell as a metaphor for judgment, and while Full Preterists view the "judgement of the lake of fire" in Revelation as referring to the destruction of Jerusalem in the year AD 70, Pantelists believe both of these things, as well as holding to a specific soteriology: With the Old Covenant system of law and judgment ended (see Abrogation of Old Covenant laws), redemption came to Israel. As a consequence, reconciliation then spread to all humankind.

Pantelism understands this inclusive reconciliation, as distinct from Israel's redemption, as the unilateral act of God and not reliant on a professed personal faith in Jesus Christ. Pantelism further acknowledges that "faith in Christ" was the prerequisite and basis for those called to serve God on behalf of others.

Because of the inclusive nature of pantelism and that it accepts the authority of the Bible some view it as a form of Christian universalism, with some referring to it as a "universalist version of full preterism."

== See also ==
- Full Preterism
