= Luis Alcázar =

Luis Alcázar may refer to:

- Luis del Alcázar (1554–1613), Spanish Jesuit theologian
- Luis Paret y Alcázar (1746–1799), Spanish painter of the late-Baroque or Rococo period
- Luis Alcazar, character in the American ABC soap opera General Hospital
