= Eschatology =

Conceptions of the end of the present age

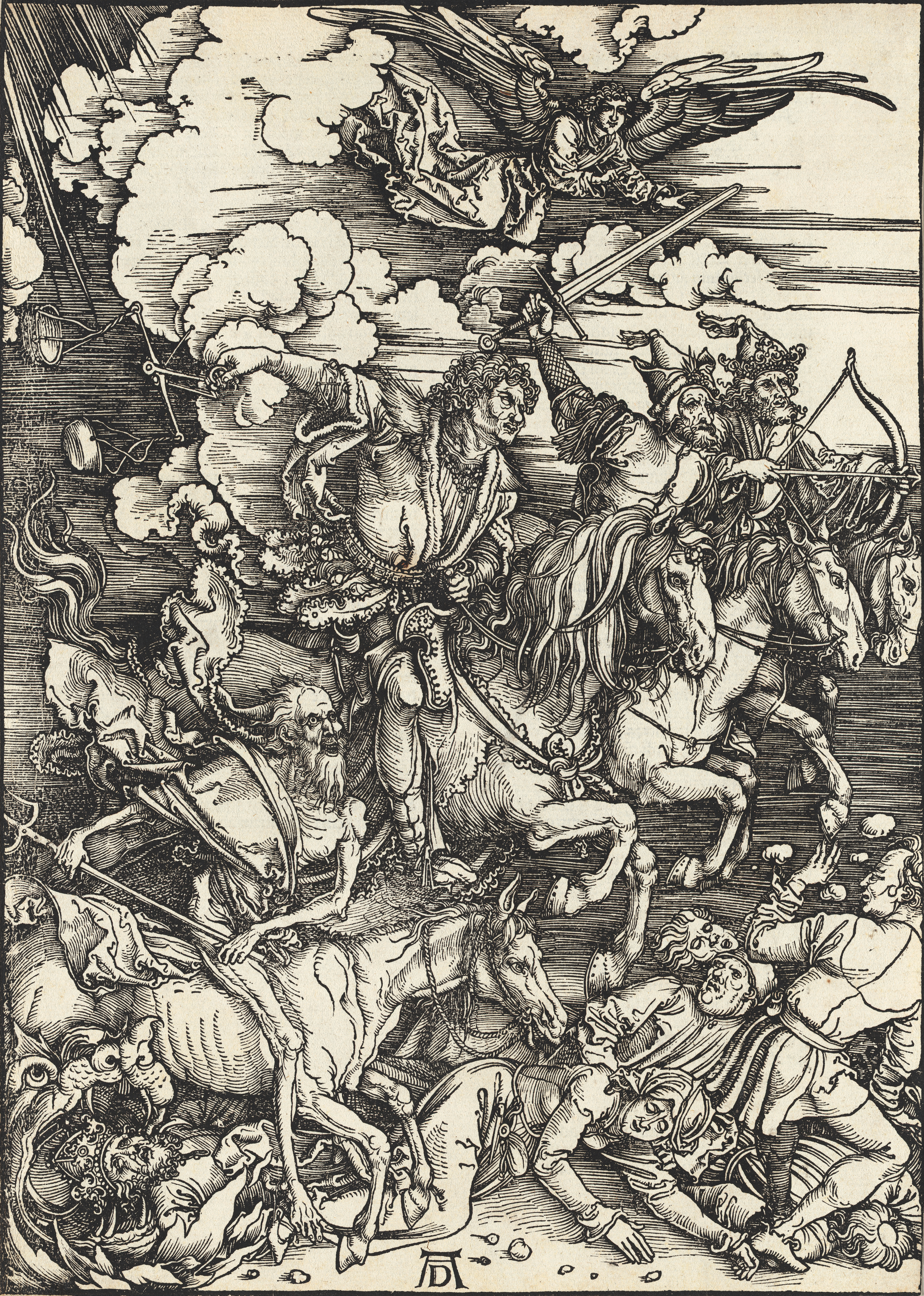
Four Horsemen of the Apocalypse, woodcut print from the Apocalypse of Albrecht Dürer (1497–1498)

Eschatology (/ˌɛskəˈtɒlədʒi/; from Ancient Greek ἔσχατος (éskhatos) 'last' and -logy) concerns expectations of the end of the present age, human history, or the world itself. The end of the world or end times is predicted by several world religions, which teach that negative world events will reach a climax. Belief that the end of the world is imminent is known as apocalypticism, and over time has been held both by members of mainstream religions and by doomsday cults. In the context of mysticism, the term refers metaphorically to the end of ordinary reality and to reunion with the divine. Many religions treat eschatology as a future event prophesied in sacred texts or in folklore, while other religions may have concepts of renewal or transformation after significant events.

The Abrahamic religions maintain a linear cosmology, with end-time scenarios containing themes of transformation and redemption. In Judaism, the term "end of days" makes reference to the Messianic Age and includes an in-gathering of the exiled Jewish diaspora, the coming of the Messiah, the resurrection of the righteous, and the world to come. Christianity depicts the end time as a period of tribulation that precedes the second coming of Christ, who will face the rise of the Antichrist along with his power structure and false prophets, and usher in the Kingdom of God. The explicit description of a new earth is primarily found in Christian teachings (this description can be found in Chapter 21 of the Book of Revelation). In Islam, numerous Shia and Sunni hadiths describe various events preceding the Day of Judgment. Among these are the emergence of the Mahdi, the appearance of the Masih ad-Dajjal, and the subsequent descent of Isa (Jesus), who will accompany the Mahdi and defeat the Antichrist. This will be followed by a sequence of events culminating in the sun rising from the west and the beginning of the Qiyāmah (Judgment Day).

Indian religions tend to have more cyclical worldviews, with end-time eschatologies characterized by decay, redemption, and rebirth (though some believe transitions between cycles are relatively uneventful). In Hinduism, the end time occurs when Kalki, the final incarnation of Vishnu, descends atop a white horse and brings an end to the current Kali Yuga, completing a cycle that starts again with the regeneration of the world. In Buddhism, the Buddha predicted his teachings would be forgotten after 5,000 years, followed by turmoil. It says a bodhisattva named Maitreya will appear and rediscover the teachings of the Buddha Dharma, and that the ultimate destruction of the world will then come through seven suns.

Since the development of the concept of deep time in the 18th century and the calculation of the estimated age of planet Earth, scientific discourse about end times has considered the ultimate fate of the universe. Theories have included the Big Rip, Big Crunch, Big Bounce, and Big Freeze (heat death). Social and scientific commentators also worry about global catastrophic risks and scenarios that could result in human extinction.

== Etymology ==
The word "eschatology" arises from the Ancient Greek term ἔσχατος (éschatos), meaning "last", and -logy, meaning "the study of", and first appeared in English around 1844. The Oxford English Dictionary defines eschatology as "the part of theology concerned with death, judgment, and the final destiny of the soul and of humankind".

== Linear cosmology ==
=== Judaism ===
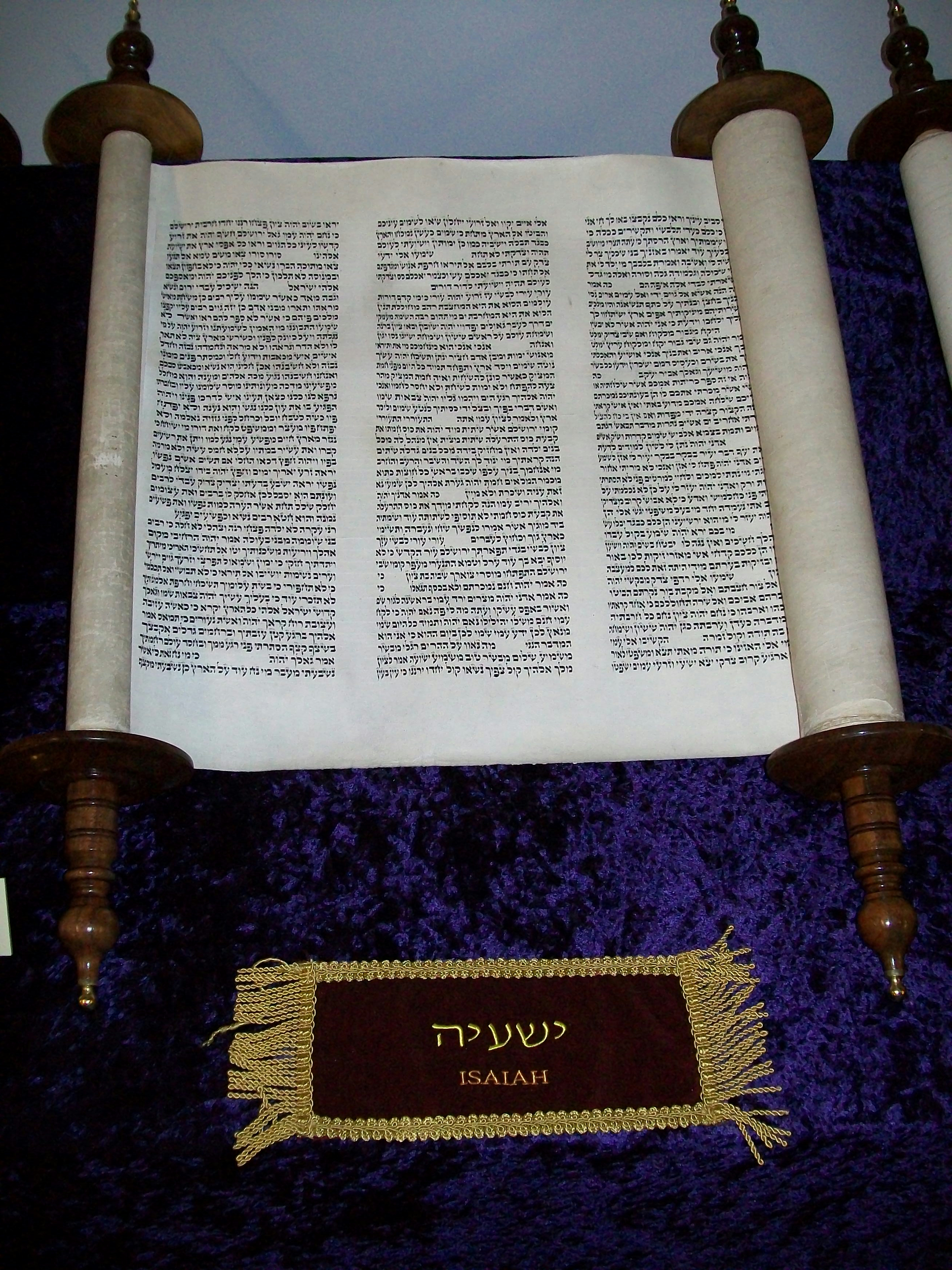
Scroll of Book of Isaiah

The main tenets of modern Jewish eschatology, in no particular order, include:

- God will redeem Israel from the captivity that began during the Babylonian Exile in a new Exodus.
- God will return the Jewish people to the Land of Israel.
- God will restore the House of David and the Temple in Jerusalem.
- God will raise up a regent from the House of David, the Jewish Messiah, to lead the Jewish people and the world and to usher in an age of justice and peace, the Messianic Age.
- Non-Jews will recognize that the God of Israel is the only true god.
- God will resurrect the dead.
- God will create a new heaven and earth.

Judaism usually refers to the end times as the "end of days" (aḥarit ha-yamim, אחרית הימים), a phrase that appears several times in the Tanakh. The end times are addressed in the Book of Daniel and in numerous other prophetic passages in the Hebrew scriptures, and also in the Talmud, particularly Tractate Avodah Zarah.

The idea of a Messianic Age, an era of global peace and knowledge of the Creator, has a prominent place in Jewish thought, and is incorporated as part of the end of days. A well-known passage from the Book of Isaiah describes this future condition of the world: "They shall beat their swords into plowshares and their spears into pruning hooks; nation will not lift sword against nation and they will no longer study warfare" (Isaiah 2:4, see also Micah 4:3). Maimonides (1135–1204) further describes the Messianic Era in the Mishneh Torah: "And at that time there will be no hunger or war, no jealousy or rivalry. For the good will be plentiful, and all delicacies available as dust. The entire occupation of the world will be only to know God; ... the people Israel will be of great wisdom; they will perceive the esoteric truths and comprehend their Creator's wisdom as is the capacity of man. As it is written (Isaiah 11:9): 'For the earth shall be filled with the knowledge of God, as the waters cover the sea.'"

==== Kabbalah ====
In Kabbalah, the Zohar maintains that the seven days of the week, based on the seven days of creation, correspond to the seven millennia of creation. The seventh day of the week, the Shabbat day of rest, corresponds to the seventh millennium, the age of universal rest, or the Messianic Era. The seventh millennium begins with the year 6000 AM, and is the latest time the Messiah can come. A number of early and late Jewish scholars have written in support of this, including the Ramban, Isaac Abarbanel, Abraham Ibn Ezra, Rabbeinu Bachya, the Vilna Gaon, the Lubavitcher Rebbe, the Ramchal, Aryeh Kaplan and Rebbetzin Esther Jungreis.

=== Zoroastrianism ===
Frashokereti is the Zoroastrian doctrine of a final renovation of the universe when evil will be destroyed, and everything else will then be in perfect unity with God (Ahura Mazda). The doctrinal premises are:

1. Good will eventually prevail over evil.
2. Creation, initially perfectly good, was subsequently corrupted by evil.
3. The world will ultimately be restored to the perfection it had at the time of creation.
4. The "salvation for the individual depended on the sum of [that person's] thoughts, words and deeds, and there could be no intervention, whether compassionate or capricious, by any divine being to alter this". Thus each human bears the responsibility for the fate of his own soul, and simultaneously shares in the responsibility for the fate of the world.

Zoroastrian eschatology is considered one of the oldest in recorded history. The birth of its founder, Zoroaster, is unknown, with scholarly dates ranging from 500 BCE to 1,500 BCE. Pliny the Elder even suggests there were two Zoroasters. However, with beliefs paralleling and possibly predating the framework of the major Abrahamic faiths, a fully developed concept of the end of the world was not established in Zoroastrianism until 500 BCE. The Bahman Yasht describes:

At the end of thy tenth hundredth winter, the sun is more unseen and more spotted; the year, month, and day are shorter; and the earth is more barren; and the crop will not yield the seed. And men become more deceitful and more given to vile practices. They will have no gratitude. Honorable wealth will proceed to those of perverted faith. And a dark cloud makes the whole sky night, and it will rain more noxious creatures than water.

A battle between the righteous and wicked will be followed by the Frashokereti. On earth, the Saoshyant will arrive as the final savior of mankind, and bring about the resurrection of the dead. The yazatas Airyaman and Atar will melt the metal in the hills and mountains, which will flow as lava across the earth and all mankind, both the living and resurrected, will be required to wade through it. Ashavan will pass through the molten river as if it were warm milk, but the sinful will burn. It will then flow down to hell, where it will annihilate Angra Mainyu and the last vestiges of wickedness.

The righteous will partake of the parahaoma, which will confer immortality upon them. Humanity will become like the Amesha Spentas, living without food, hunger, thirst, weapons or injury. Bodies will become so light as to cast no shadow. All humanity will speak a single language, and belong to a single nation with no borders. All will share a single purpose and goal, joining with Ahura Mazda for a perpetual and divine exaltation.

=== Gnosticism ===
The Gnostic codex On the Origin of the World (possibly dating from near the end of the third century AD) states that during what is called the consummation of the age, the Sun and Moon will become dark as the stars change their ordinary course. Kings will make war with each other, and thunder will cause the world to be shaken. The corrupt Archons will mourn. The sea will be troubled by fighting of the kings who became drunk from the flaming sword. Finally, great thunder will come from Sophia, the woman in the firmament above the forces of Chaos. She will cast the corrupt gods into the abyss where they will fight each other until only their chief Yaldabaoth remains and destroys himself. Next the heavens of the Archons will collapse on each other before the Earth sinks into the abyss. Light will cover the darkness and eliminate it then form into something greater than anything that ever existed before. The source of the darkness will dissolve, and the deficiency will be taken from its root. Those who were not perfected in the unconceived one will receive glories in their realms and kingdoms of the immortals, but those who were will enter a kingless realm. All will be judged according to their deeds and gnosis.

=== Christianity ===
Christian eschatology is the study concerned with the ultimate destiny of the individual soul and of the entire created order, based primarily upon biblical texts within the Old and New Testaments.

Christian eschatological research looks to study and discuss matters such as the nature of the divine and the divine nature of Jesus Christ, death and the afterlife, Heaven and Hell, the Second Coming of Jesus, the resurrection of the dead, the rapture, the Tribulation, millennialism, the end of the world, the Last Judgment, and the New Heaven and New Earth in the world to come.

Eschatological passages occur in many places in the Bible, in both the Old and the New Testaments. In the Old Testament, apocalyptic eschatology can be found notably in Isaiah 24–27, Isaiah 56–66, Joel, Zechariah 9–14 as well as in the closing chapters of Daniel, and in Ezekiel. In the New Testament, applicable passages include Matthew 24, Mark 13, the parable of "The Sheep and the Goats" and the Book of Revelation—Revelation often occupies a central place in Christian eschatology.

The Second Coming of Christ is the central event in Christian eschatology within the broader context of the fullness of the Kingdom of God. No consensus on the interpretation of the kingdom of God has emerged to date. Dale Allison argues that many Biblical prophecies such as Jesus's return were contingent on the repentance of Israel to proceed. Most Christians believe that death and suffering will continue to exist until Christ's return. There are, however, various views concerning the order and significance of other eschatological events.

The Book of Revelation stands at the core of much of Christian eschatology. The study of Revelation is usually divided into four interpretative methodologies or hermeneutics:

- The Futurist approach treats the Book of Revelation mostly as unfulfilled prophecy taking place in some yet undetermined future.
- The Preterist approach interprets Revelation chiefly as having had prophetic fulfillment in the past, principally in the events of the first century CE.
- The Historicist approach places Revelation within the context of history, identifying figures and passages in Revelation with major historical people and events. This view was commonly held by the early Christian church, then among the predecessors to Protestantism, such as John Wycliffe, Joachim of Fiore and later by the majority of Protestant Reformers, such as Martin Luther, John Calvin, and John Wesley. Further supporters of this view included Isaac Newton (1642–1727), among others.
- The Idealist approach sees the events of Revelation as neither past nor future actualities, but as purely symbolic accounts, dealing with the ongoing struggle and ultimate triumph of good over evil.

The precise time, however, will come like a "thief in the night" (1 Thess. 5:2). They may also refer to Matthew 24:36 in which Jesus is quoted as saying:

"But concerning that day and hour no one knows, not even the angels of heaven, nor the Son, but the Father only."

==== Great Tribulation ====
In the New Testament, Jesus refers to this period preceding the end times as the "Great Tribulation" (Matthew 24:21), "Affliction" (Mark 13:19), and "days of vengeance" (Luke 21:22).

The Book of Matthew describes the devastation:

When ye therefore shall see the abomination of desolation, spoken of by Daniel the prophet, stand in the holy place, (whoso readeth, let him understand). Then let them which be in Judaea flee into the mountains. Let him which is on the housetop not come down. ...Neither let him which is in the field return back to take his clothes, and woe unto them that are with child. ...For then shall be great tribulation, such as was not since the beginning of the world to this time, no, nor ever shall be. And except those days should be shortened, there should no flesh be saved: but for the elect's sake those days shall be shortened.

— Matthew 24:15–22

The resulting chaos will affect pregnancies, newborns, and a scourge will spread throughout the flesh, save for the elect. The vivid imagery of this section is repeated closely in Mark 13:14–20.

The Gospel of Luke describes a complete unraveling of the social fabric, with widespread calamity and war:

Then he said to them, "Nation will rise against nation, and kingdom against kingdom. There will be great earthquakes, and in various places famines and pestilences. And there will be terrors and great signs from heaven. But before all this they will lay their hands on you and persecute you, delivering you up to the synagogues and prisons, and you will be brought before kings and governors for my name's sake. This will be your opportunity to bear witness. Settle it therefore in your minds not to meditate beforehand how to answer, for I will give you a mouth and wisdom, which none of your adversaries will be able to withstand or contradict. You will be delivered up even by parents and brothers and relatives and friends, and some of you they will put to death. You will be hated by all for my name's sake. But not a hair of your head will perish. By your endurance you will gain your lives.

"But when you see Jerusalem surrounded by armies, then know that its desolation has come near. Then let those who are in Judea flee to the mountains, and let those who are inside the city depart, and let not those who are out in the country enter it, for these are days of vengeance, to fulfill all that is written. Alas for women who are pregnant and for those who are nursing infants in those days! For there will be great distress upon the earth and wrath against this people. They will fall by the edge of the sword and be led captive among all nations, and Jerusalem will be trampled underfoot by the Gentiles, until the times of the Gentiles are fulfilled.

"And there will be signs in sun and moon and stars, and on the earth distress of nations in perplexity because of the roaring of the sea and the waves, people fainting with fear and with foreboding of what is coming on the world. For the powers of the heavens will be shaken. And then they will see the Son of Man coming in a cloud with power and great glory. Now when these things begin to take place, straighten up and raise your heads, because your redemption is drawing near."

And he told them a parable: "Look at the fig tree, and all the trees. As soon as they come out in leaf, you see for yourselves and know that the summer is already near. So also, when you see these things taking place, you know that the kingdom of God is near. Truly, I say to you, this generation will not pass away until all has taken place. Heaven and earth will pass away, but my words will not pass away."

— Luke 21:10–33

In the Book of Revelation, the "great tribulation" (Rev. 7:14b) refers to a time of affliction upon God's people.

==== Catholicism ====
The Profession of Faith addresses Catholic beliefs concerning the last days. Catholicism adheres to the amillennial school of thought, promoted by Augustine of Hippo in his work The City of God.

==== Protestantism ====
Contemporary use of the term End Times has evolved from literal belief in Christian millennialism. In this tradition, Biblical apocalypse is believed to be imminent, with various current events as omens of impending Armageddon. These beliefs have been put forward by the Adventist movement (Millerites) and dispensational premillennialists. In 1918 a group of eight, well-known preachers produced the London Manifesto, warning of an imminent second coming of Christ shortly after the 1917 liberation of Jerusalem by the British.

===== Millennialists and Amillennialists =====
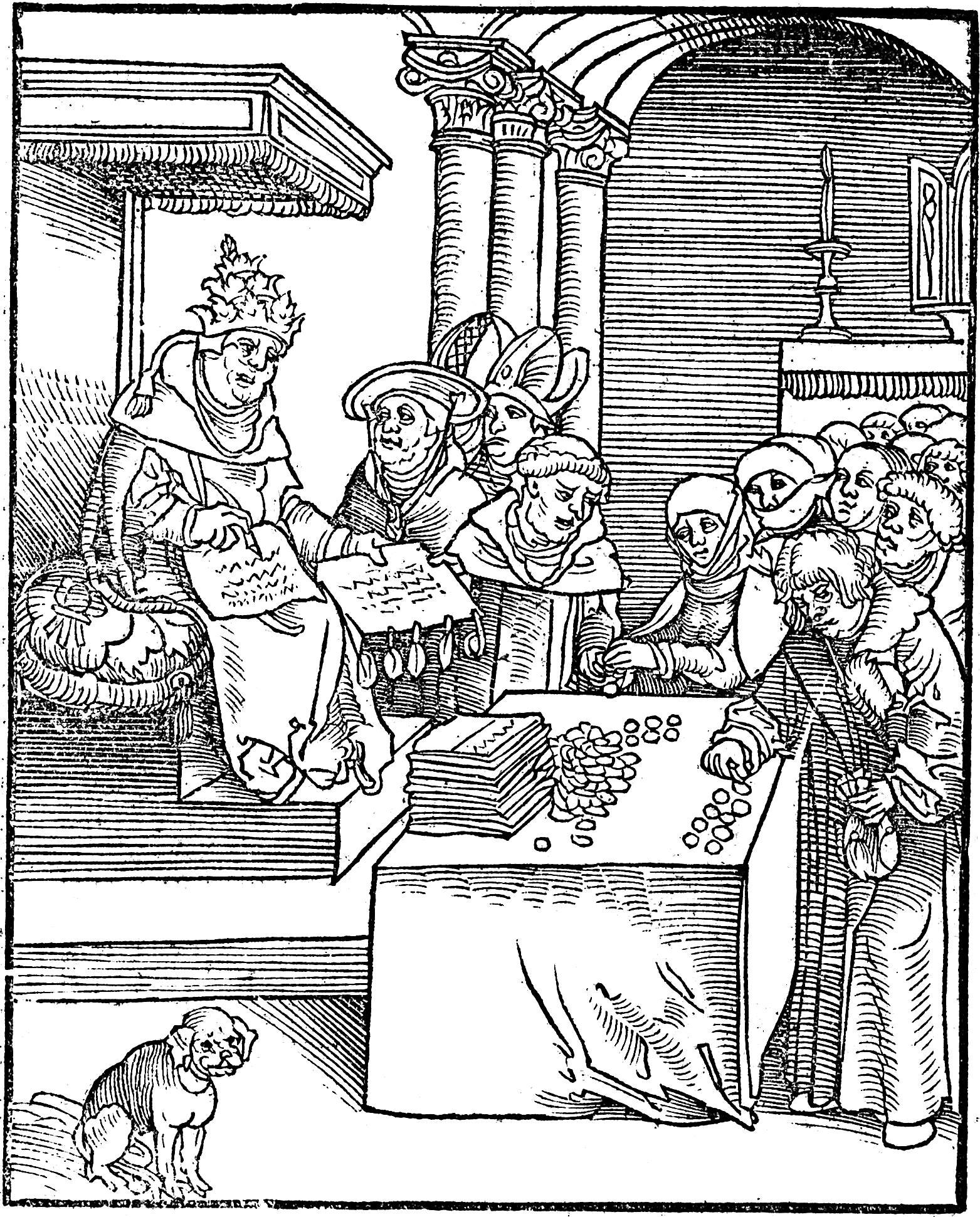
The Antichrist, by Lucas Cranach the Elder (1521). Here the Antichrist is shown wearing the triple crown of the Roman papacy.

Protestants are divided between Millennialists and Amillennialists. Millennialists concentrate on the issue of whether the true believers will see the Great Tribulation or be removed from it by what is referred to as a Pre-Tribulation rapture.

Amillennialists believe the end times encompass the time from Christ's ascension to the last day, and maintain that the mention of the "thousand years" in the Book of Revelation is meant to be taken metaphorically (i.e., not literally), a view which continues to cause divisions within Protestant Christianity.

There is a range of eschatological belief in Protestant Christianity. Christian premillennialists who believe the end times are occurring now, are usually specific about timelines that climax in the end of the world. For some, Israel, the European Union, or the United Nations are seen as major players whose roles were foretold in scripture. Within dispensational premillennialist writing, there is the belief that Christians will be summoned to Heaven by Christ at the rapture, occurring before a Great Tribulation prophesied in Matthew 24–25; Mark 13 and Luke 21. The Tribulation is described in the Book of Revelation.

"End times" may also refer to the passing of an age or long period in the relationship between man and God. Adherents to this view cite the Second Epistle to Timothy and draw analogies to the late twentieth and early twenty-first centuries.

Post-Exilic Hebrew books of prophecy such as Daniel and Ezekiel are given new interpretations in this Christian tradition, while apocalyptic forecasts appear in the Judeo-Christian Sibylline Oracles which include the Book of Revelation ascribed to John, the apocryphal Apocalypse of Peter, and the Second Book of Esdras.

===== Adventists and Millerites =====
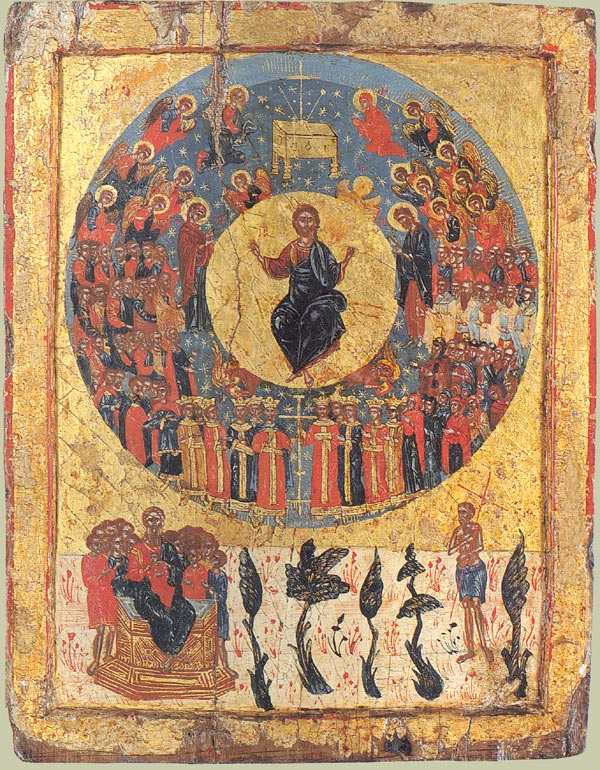
Icon of the Second Coming. Greek, c. 1700 A.D.

Religious movements which expect that the second coming of Christ will be a cataclysmic event are generally called adventism. These have arisen throughout the Christian era, but were particularly common after the Protestant Reformation. Emanuel Swedenborg considered the second coming to be symbolic, and to have occurred in 1757. Along with others, he developed a religious system around the second coming of Christ, disclosed by new prophecy or special revelation not described in the Bible. The Millerites are diverse religious groups which similarly rely upon a special gift of interpretation for predicting the second coming.

The difference between the 19th-century Millerite and adventist movements and contemporary prophecy is that William Miller and his followers, based on biblical interpretation, predicted the time of the Second Coming to have occurred in 1844. Contemporary writing of end time has suggested the timetable will be triggered by future wars and moral catastrophe, and that this time of tribulation is close at hand.

Seventh-day Adventists believe biblical prophecy to foretell an end time scenario in which the United States works in conjunction with the Catholic Church to mandate worship on a day other than the true Sabbath, Saturday, as prescribed in the Ten Commandments (Exodus 20:8–11). This will bring about a situation where one must choose for or against the Bible as the will of God.

===== Preterists =====
Another view of the end times is preterism. It distinguishes the time of the end from the end of time. Preterists believe the term last days (or Time of the End) refers to, neither the last days of the Earth, nor the last days of humankind, but the end of the Old Covenant between God and Israel; which, according to preterism, took place when the Temple in Jerusalem was destroyed in 70 CE.

Preterists believe that prophecies—such as the Second Coming, the desecration of the Jewish Temple, the destruction of Jerusalem, the rise of the Antichrist, the Great Tribulation, the advent of The Day of the Lord, and a Final Judgment—had been fulfilled when the Romans sacked Jerusalem and completely destroyed its Temple.

Proponents of full preterism do not believe in a coming resurrection of the dead. They place this event (as well as the Second Coming) in the year 70. Advocates of partial preterism do believe in a coming resurrection. Full preterists contend that partial preterists are merely futurists, since they believe the Second Coming, the Resurrection, the Rapture, and the Judgment are yet to come.

Many preterists believe first-century Christians experienced the Rapture to rejoin the Christ.

According with Preterism's interpretation of end times, many "time passages" in the New Testament foretell a Second Coming of Christ, with last days to take place within the lifetimes of his disciples: Matt. 10:23, Matt. 16:28, Matt. 24:34, Matt. 26:64, Rom. 13:11–12, 1 Cor. 7:29–31, 1 Cor. 10:11, Phil. 4:5, James 5:8–9, 1 Pet. 4:7, 1 Jn. 2:18.

===== Dispensationalists =====
Dispensationalism is an evangelical futurist Biblical interpretation that foresees a series of dispensations, or periods, in which God relates to human beings under different Biblical covenants. The belief system is primarily rooted in the writings of John Nelson Darby and is premillennial in content. The reestablishment of Israel in 1948 provided a major impetus to the dispensationalist belief system. The wars of Israel after 1948 with its Arab neighbors provided further support, according to John F. Walvoord. After the Six-Day War in 1967, and the Yom Kippur War in 1973, it seemed plausible to many Fundamentalist Christians in the 1970s that Middle East turmoil may well be leading up to the fulfillment of various Bible prophecies and to the Battle of Armageddon.

Members of the dispensationalist movement such as Hal Lindsey, J. Dwight Pentecost, John Walvoord, all of whom have Dallas Theological Seminary backgrounds, and some other writers, claimed further that the European Economic Community, which preceded the European Union, would become a United States of Europe, which would in turn become a Revived Roman Empire ruled by the Antichrist. The Revived Roman Empire also figured into the New Testament writers' vision of the future. The fact that in the early 1970s, there were (erroneously thought to be) seven nations in the European Economic Community was held to be significant; this aligned the Community with a seven-headed beast mentioned in Revelation. This specific prophecy has required revision, but the idea of a Revived Roman Empire remains.

Dispensationalism, in contrast to the Millerite Adventist movement, had its beginning in the 19th century, when John Nelson Darby, founder of the Plymouth Brethren religious denomination, incorporated into his system of Biblical interpretation a system of organizing Biblical time into a number of discrete dispensations, each of which marks a separate covenant with God. Darby's beliefs were widely publicized in Cyrus I. Scofield's Scofield Reference Bible, an annotated Bible that became popular in the United States.

Since the majority of the Biblical prophets were writing at a time when the Temple in Jerusalem was still functioning, they wrote as if it would still be standing during the prophesied events. According to preterism, this was a fulfillment of the prophecies. However, according to Futurists, their destruction in AD 70 put the prophetic timetable on hold. Many such believers therefore anticipated the return of Jews to Israel and the reconstruction of the Temple before the Second Coming could occur.

==== Posttribulation premillennialism ====
A view of the Second Coming of Christ as held by posttribulational premillennialists holds that the Church of Christ will have to undergo great persecution by being present during the great tribulation.

==== Specific prophetic movements ====
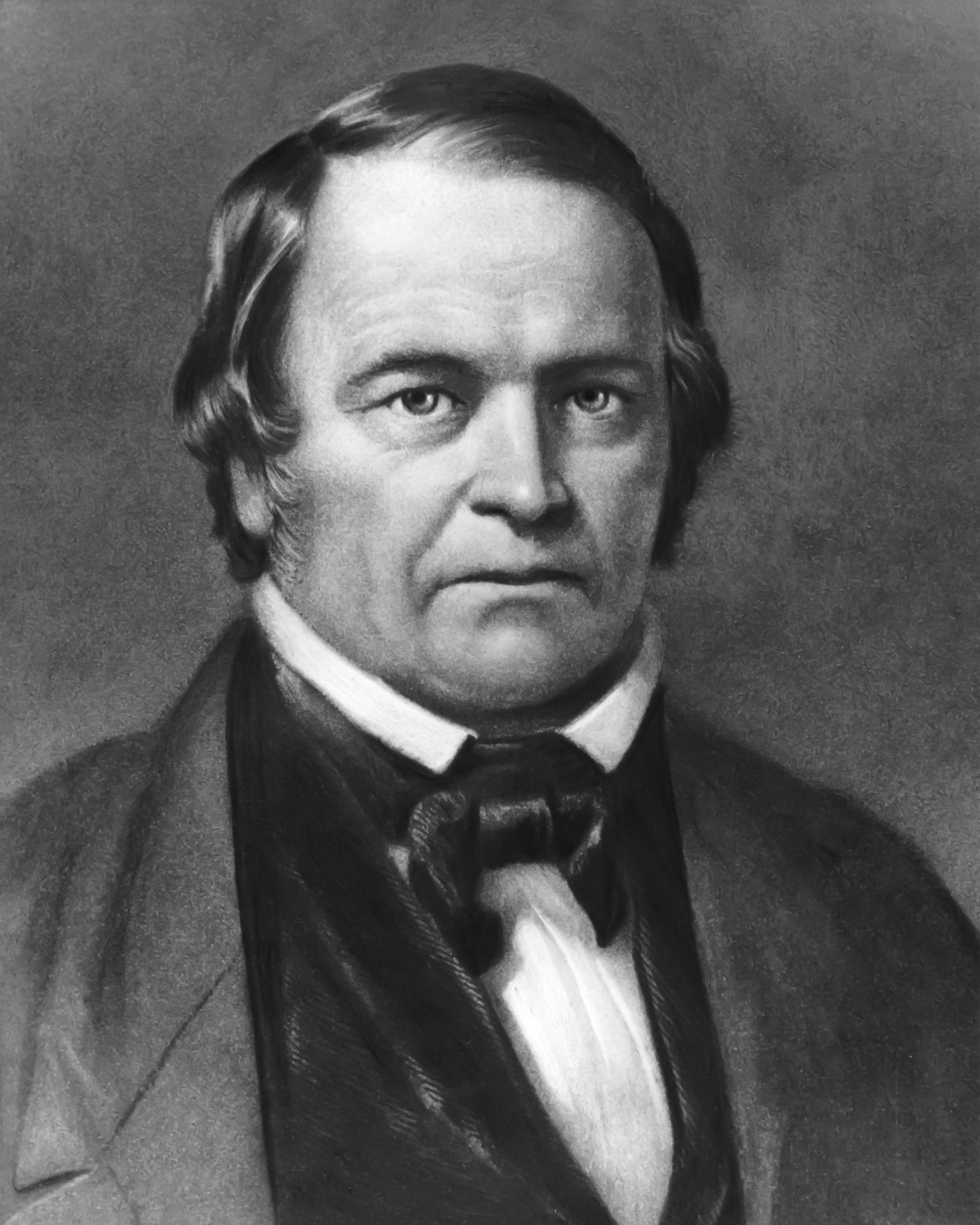
William Miller predicted the end of the world in 1843, known as the Great Disappointment.

In 1843, William Miller made the first of several predictions that the world would end in only a few months. As his predictions did not come true (referred to as the Great Disappointment), followers of Miller went on to found separate groups, the most successful of which is the Seventh-day Adventist Church.

Members of the Baháʼí Faith believe Miller's interpretation of signs and dates of the coming of Jesus were, for the most part, correct. They believe the fulfillment of biblical prophecies of the coming of Christ came through a forerunner of their own religion, the Báb. According to the Báb's words, 4 April 1844 was "the first day that the Spirit descended" into his heart. His subsequent declaration to Mullá Husayn-i Bushru'i that he was the "Promised One"—an event now commemorated by Baháʼís as a major holy day—took place on 23 May 1844. It was in October of that year that the Báb embarked on a pilgrimage to Mecca, where he openly declared his claims to the Sharif of Mecca. The first news coverage of these events in the West was in 1845 by The Times, followed by others in 1850 in the United States. The first Baháʼí to come to America was in 1892. Several Baháʼí books and pamphlets make mention of the Millerites, the prophecies used by Miller and the Great Disappointment, most notably William Sears's Thief in the Night.

==== Restorationism (Christian primitivism) ====
End times theology is also significant to restorationist Christian religions, which consider themselves distinct from both Catholicism and Protestantism.

===== Jehovah's Witnesses =====
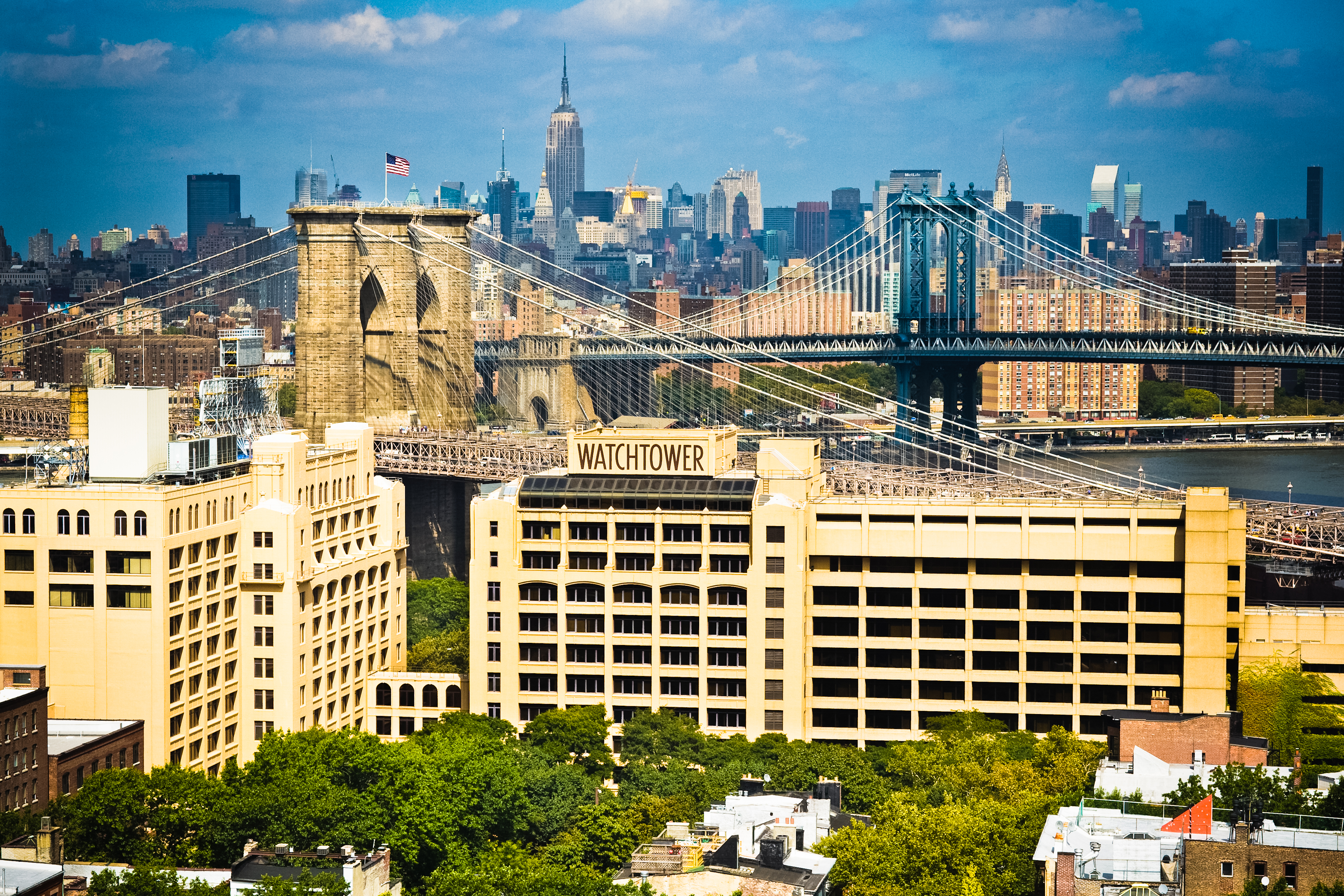
Former Watchtower headquarters in Brooklyn. The society made a number of emphatic claims of impending last days and ensuing chaos between 1879 and 1924.

The eschatology of Jehovah's Witnesses is central to their religious beliefs. They believe Jesus Christ has been ruling in heaven as king since 1914 (a date they believe was prophesied in the Bible) and that after that time a period of cleansing occurred, resulting in God's selection of the Bible Students associated with Charles Taze Russell as his people in 1919. They also believe that the destruction of those who reject the Bible's message and thus willfully refuse to obey God will shortly take place at Armageddon, ensuring that the beginning of the new earthly society will be composed of willing subjects of that kingdom.

The religion's doctrines surrounding 1914 are the legacy of a series of emphatic claims regarding the years 1799, 1874, 1878, 1914, 1918 and 1925 made in the Watch Tower Society's publications between 1879 and 1924. Claims about the significance of those years, including the presence of Jesus Christ, the beginning of the "last days", the destruction of worldly governments and the earthly resurrection of Jewish patriarchs, were successively abandoned. In 1922 the society's principal magazine, The Watchtower, described its chronology as "no stronger than its weakest link", but also claimed the chronological relationships to be "of divine origin and divinely corroborated ... in a class by itself, absolutely and unqualifiedly correct" and "indisputable facts", and repudiation of Russell's teachings was described as "equivalent to a repudiation of the Lord".

The Watch Tower Society has acknowledged its early leaders promoted "incomplete, even inaccurate concepts". The Governing Body of Jehovah's Witnesses says that, unlike Old Testament prophets, its interpretations of the Bible are not inspired or infallible. It says that Bible prophecies can be fully understood only after their fulfillment, citing examples of biblical figures who did not understand the meaning of prophecies they received. Watch Tower Society literature often cites Proverbs 4:18, "The path of the righteous ones is like the bright light that is getting lighter and lighter until the day is firmly established" (NWT) to support their view that there would be an increase in knowledge during "the time of the end", and that this increase in knowledge needs adjustments. Watch Tower Society publications also say that unfulfilled expectations are partly due to eagerness for God's Kingdom and that they do not call their core beliefs into question.

===== The Church of Jesus Christ of Latter-day Saints =====
Members of the Church of Jesus Christ of Latter-day Saints (LDS Church) believe there will be a Second Coming of Jesus to the earth at some time in the future. The LDS Church and its leaders do not make any predictions of the date of the Second Coming.

According to church doctrine, the true gospel will be taught in all parts of the world prior to the Second Coming. They also believe there will be increasing war, wickedness, earthquakes, hurricanes, and man-made disasters prior to the Second Coming. Disasters of all kind will happen before Christ comes. Upon the return of Jesus Christ, all people will be resurrected, the righteous in a first resurrection and the unrighteous in a second, later resurrection. Christ shall reign for a period of 1000 years, after which the Final Judgment will occur.

==== Realized eschatology ====
Realized eschatology is a Christian eschatological theory that holds that the eschatological passages in the New Testament do not refer to the future, but instead refer to the ministry of Jesus and his lasting legacy.

=== Islam ===
Diagram of "Plain of Assembly" (Ard al-Hashr) on the Day of Judgment, from an autograph manuscript of Futuhat al-Makkiyya by Sufi mystic and Muslim philosopher Ibn Arabi, c. 1238. Shown are the 'Arsh (Throne of God), pulpits for the righteous (al-Aminun), seven rows of angels, Gabriel (al-Ruh), A'raf (the Barrier), the Pond of Abundance, al-Maqam al-Mahmud (the Praiseworthy Station; where the Islamic prophet Muhammad will stand to intercede for the faithful), Mizan (the Scale), As-Sirāt (the Bridge), Jahannam (Hell), and Marj al-Jannat (Meadow of Paradise).

Muslims believe there are three periods before the Day of Judgment with some debate as to whether the periods could overlap.

==== Sunni ====
Sunnis believe the dead will then stand in a grand assembly, awaiting a scroll detailing their righteous deeds, sinful acts and ultimate judgment. (Note: Quran 74:38) Muhammad will be the first to be resurrected. Punishments will include adhab, or severe pain and embarrassment, and khizy or shame. There will also be a punishment of the grave between death and the resurrection. Several Sunni scholars explain some of the signs metaphorically.

The signs of the coming end time are divided into major and minor signs: Following the second period, the third is said to be marked by the ten major signs known as alamatu's-sa'ah al- kubra (The major signs of the end). (Note: Sahih Muslim, Book 41, Hadith 6931) They are as follows:

1. A huge black cloud of smoke (dukhan) will cover the earth. (Note: Sahih Muslim)
2. Three sinkings of the earth, one in the East.
3. One sinking of the earth in the West.
4. One sinking of the earth in Arabia.
5. The false messiah—anti-Christ, Masih ad-Dajjal—shall appear with great powers as a one-eyed man with his right eye blind and deformed like a grape. Although believers will not be deceived, he will claim to be God, to hold the keys to heaven and hell, and will lead many astray. In reality, his heaven is hell, and his hell is heaven. The Dajjal will be followed by seventy thousand Jews of Isfahan wearing Persian shawls. (Note: Muslim, Book 41, Hadith 7034)
6. The return of Isa (Jesus), from the fourth sky, to kill Dajjal.
7. Ya'jooj and Ma'jooj (Gog and Magog), a Japhetic tribe of vicious beings who had been imprisoned by Dhul-Qarnayn, will break out. They will ravage the earth, drink all the water of Lake Tiberias, and kill all believers in their way. Isa, Imam Al-Mahdi, and the believers with them will go to the top of a mountain and pray for the destruction of Gog and Magog. God eventually will send disease and worms to wipe them out. (Note: Quran 21:96)
8. The sun will rise from the West.
9. The Dabbat al-ard, or Beast of the Earth, will come out of the ground to talk to people. (Note: Quran 27:82)
10. The second blow of the trumpet will be sounded, the dead will return to life, and a fire will come out of Yemen that shall gather all to Mahshar Al Qiy'amah (The Gathering for Judgment).
Mainstream Sunni timeline

Mainstream Islamic timeline

==== Shia ====
Many of the signs shown above are shared by both Sunni and Shia beliefs, with some exceptions, e.g. Imam Al-Mahdi defeating Al-Masih ad-Dajjal.

Concepts and terminology in Shia eschatology include Mi'ad, the Occultation, Al-Yamani, and Sufyani. In Twelver Shia narrations about the last days, the literature largely revolves around Muhammad al-Mahdi, who is considered by many beliefs to be the true twelfth appointed successor to Muhammad. Muhammad al-Mahdi will help mankind against the deception by the Dajjal who will try to get people in to a new world religion which is called "the great deception".

==== Ahmadiyya ====
Ahmadiyya is considered distinct from mainstream Islam. In its writing, the present age has been witness to the evil of man and wrath of God, with war and natural disaster. Ghulam Ahmad is seen as the promised Messiah and the Mahdi, fulfilling Islamic and Biblical prophecies, as well as scriptures of other religions such as Hinduism. His teaching will establish spiritual reform and establish an age of peace. This will continue for a thousand years, and will unify mankind under one faith.

Ahmadis believe that despite harsh and strong opposition and discrimination they will eventually be triumphant and their message vindicated both by Muslims and non-Muslims alike. Ahmadis also incorporate the eschatological views from other religions into their doctrine and believe Mirza Ghulam Ahmed falls into this sequence.

=== Baháʼí Faith ===
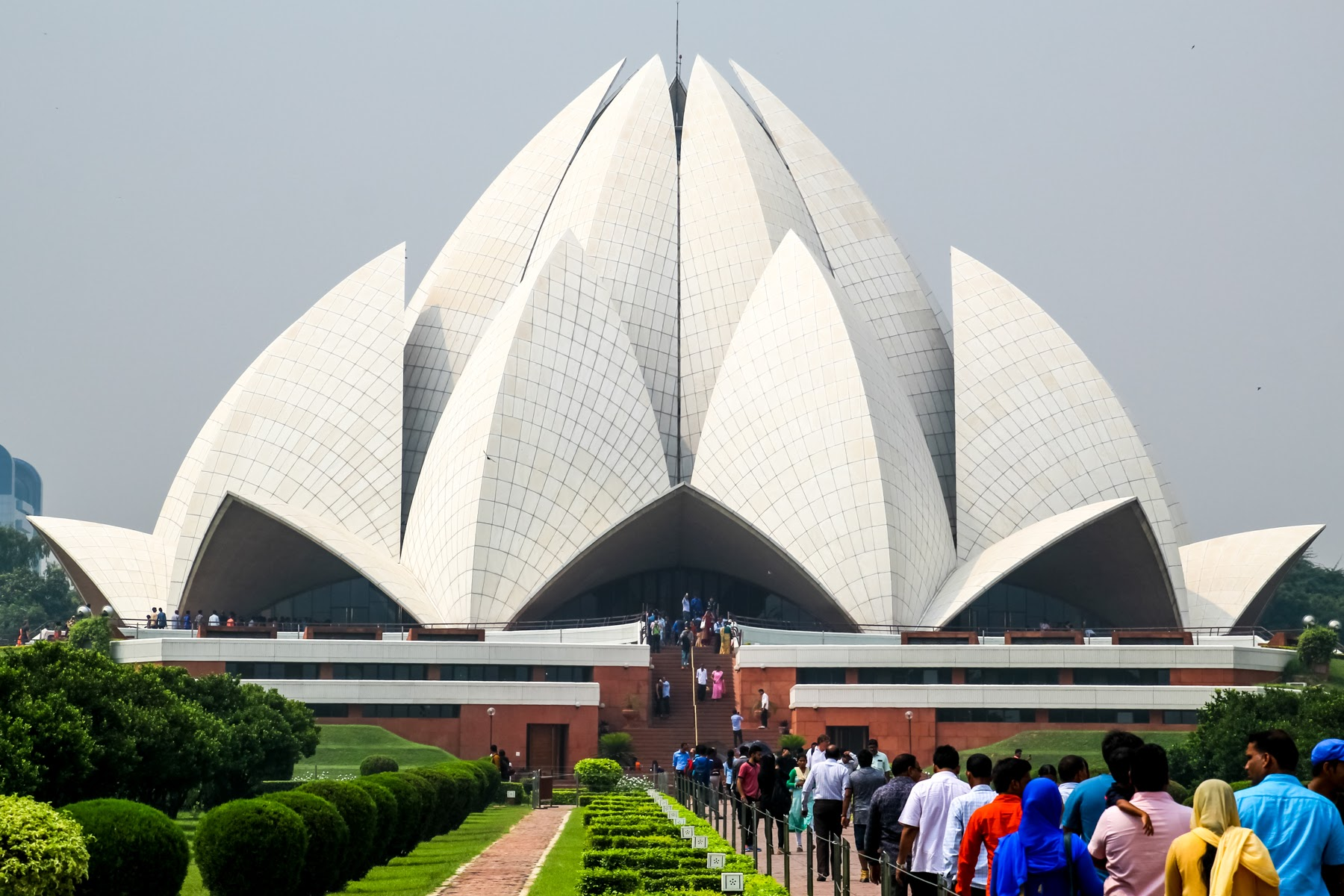
Bahá'í House of Worship, Delhi, India

In the Baháʼí Faith, creation has neither a beginning nor an end; Baháʼís regard the eschatologies of other religions as symbolic. In Baháʼí belief, human time is marked by a series of progressive revelations in which successive messengers or prophets come from God. The coming of each of these messengers is seen as the day of judgment to the adherents of the previous religion, who may choose to accept the new messenger and enter the "heaven" of belief, or denounce the new messenger and enter the "hell" of denial. In this view, the terms "heaven" and "hell" become symbolic terms for a person's spiritual progress and their nearness to or distance from God. In Baháʼí belief, Bahá'u'lláh (1817–1892), the founder of the Baháʼí Faith, was the Second Coming of Christ and also the fulfilment of previous eschatological expectations of Islam and other major religions.

The inception of the Baháʼí Faith coincides with Great Disappointment of the Millerite prophecy in 1844.

ʻAbdu'l-Bahá taught that Armageddon would begin in 1914, but without a clear indication of its end date. Baháʼís believe that the mass martyrdom anticipated during the End Times had already passed within the historical context of the Baháʼí Faith. Baháʼís expect their faith to be eventually embraced by the masses of the world, ushering in a golden age.

=== Rastafari ===
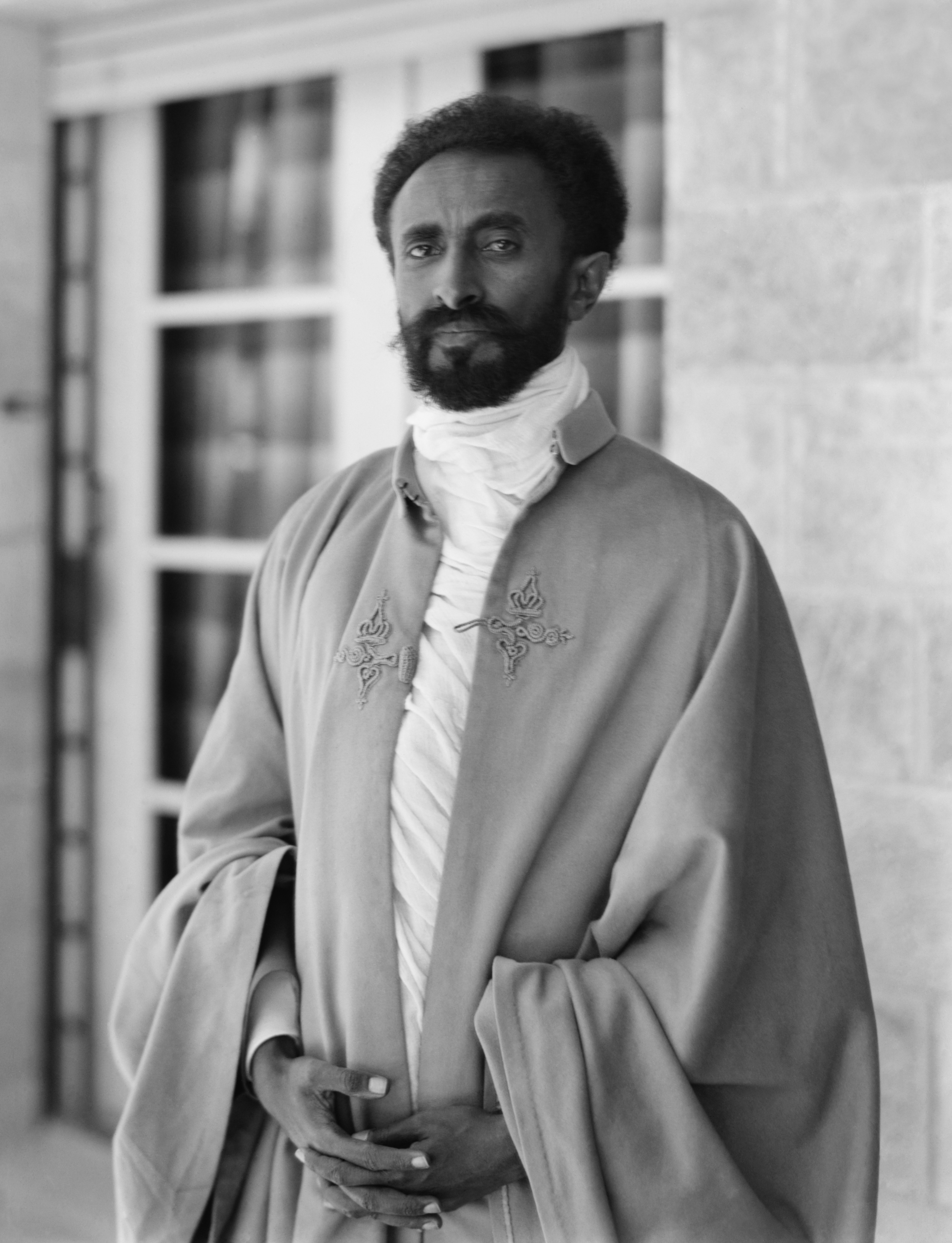
Haile Selassie I is viewed as god incarnate in Rastafari.

Rastafari have a unique interpretation of end times, based on the Old Testament and the Book of Revelation. They believe Ethiopian Emperor Haile Selassie I to be God incarnate, the King of kings and Lord of lords mentioned in Revelation 5:5. They saw the crowning of Selassie as the second coming, and the Second Italo-Ethiopian War as fulfillment of Revelation. There is also the expectation that Selassie will return for a day of judgment and bring home the "lost children of Israel", which in Rastafari refers to those taken from Africa through the slave trade. There will then be an era of peace and harmony at Mount Zion in Africa.

== Cyclic cosmology ==
=== Hinduism ===
The Vaishnavite tradition links contemporary Hindu eschatology to the figure of Kalki, the tenth and last avatar of Vishnu. Many Hindus believe that before the age draws to a close, Kalki will reincarnate as Shiva and simultaneously dissolve and regenerate the universe. Shaivites hold the view that Shiva is incessantly destroying and creating the world.

In Hindu eschatology, time is cyclic and consists of kalpas. Each lasts 4.1–8.2 billion years, which is a period of one full day and night for Brahma, who will be alive for 311 trillion, 40 billion years. Within a kalpa there are periods of creation, preservation and decline. After this larger cycle, all of creation will contract to a singularity and then again will expand from that single point, as the ages continue in a religious fractal pattern.

Within the current kalpa, there are four epochs that encompass the cycle. They progress from a beginning of complete purity to a descent into total corruption. The last of the four ages is Kali Yuga (which most Hindus believe is the current time), characterized by quarrel, hypocrisy, impiety, violence and decay. The four pillars of dharma will be reduced to one, with truth being all that remains. As written in the Gita:

Yadā yadā hi dharmasya glānirbhavati Bhārata
Abhyutthānam adharmasya tadātmānam sṛjāmyaham

O descendant of Bharata, whenever there is a decline of religion and an increase in irreligion, at that time I manifest My eternally perfect form in this mundane world.

At this time of chaos, the final avatar, Kalki, endowed with eight superhuman faculties will appear on a white horse. Kalki will amass an army to "establish righteousness upon the earth" and leave "the minds of the people as pure as crystal."

At the completion of Kali Yuga, the next Yuga Cycle will begin with a new Satya Yuga, in which all will once again be righteous with the reestablishment of dharma. This, in turn, will be followed by epochs of Treta Yuga, Dvapara Yuga and again another Kali Yuga. This cycle will then repeat until the larger cycle of existence under Brahma returns to the singularity, and a new universe is born. The cycle of birth, growth, decay, and renewal at the individual level finds its echo in the cosmic order, yet is affected by vagueries of divine intervention in Vaishnavite belief.

=== Buddhism ===
There is no classic account of beginning or end in Buddhism; Masao Abe attributes this to the absence of God.

History is embedded in the continuing process of samsara or the "beginningless and endless cycles of birth-death-rebirth". Buddhists believe there is an end to things but it is not final because they are bound to be born again. However, the writers of Mahayana Buddhist scriptures establish a specific end-time account in Buddhist tradition: this describes the return of Maitreya Buddha, who would bring about an end to the world. This constitutes one of the two major branches of Buddhist eschatology, with the other being the Sermon of the Seven Suns. End time in Buddhism could also involve a cultural eschatology covering "final things", which include the idea that Sakyamuni Buddha's dharma will also come to an end.

==== Maitreya ====
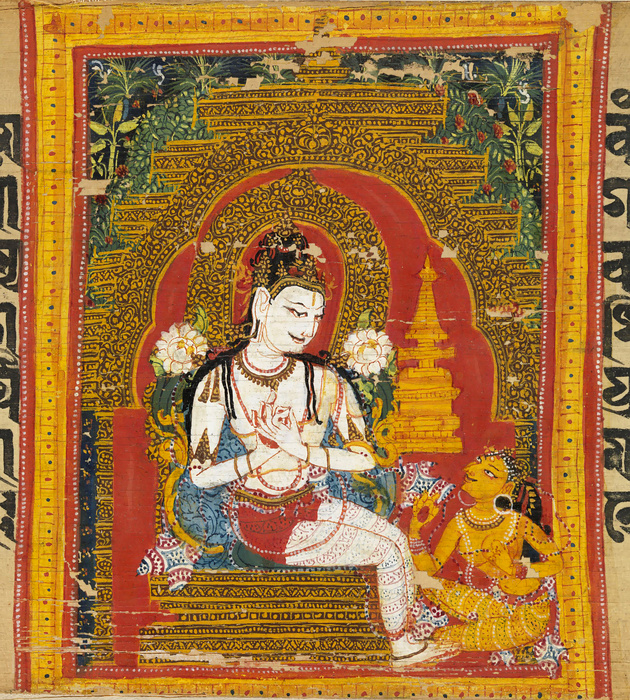
Bodhisattva Maitreya

The Buddha described his teachings disappearing five thousand years from when he preached them, corresponding approximately to the year 4300 since he was born in 623 BCE. At this time, knowledge of dharma will be lost as well. The last of his relics will be gathered in Bodh Gaya and cremated. There will be a new era in which the next Buddha Maitreya will appear, but it will be preceded by the degeneration of human society. This will be a period of greed, lust, poverty, ill will, violence, murder, impiety, physical weakness, sexual depravity and societal collapse, and even the Buddha himself will be forgotten.

This will be followed by the coming of Maitreya when the teachings of dharma are forgotten. Maitreya was the first Bodhisattva around whom a cult developed, in approximately the third century CE.

The earliest known mention of Maitreya occurs in the Cakkavatti, or Sihanada Sutta in Digha Nikaya 26 of the Pali Canon. In it, Gautama Buddha predicted his teachings of dharma would be forgotten after 5,000 years.

At that period, brethren, there will arise in the world an Exalted One named Maitreya, Fully Awakened, abounding in wisdom and goodness, happy, with knowledge of the worlds, unsurpassed as a guide to mortals willing to be led, a teacher for gods and men, an Exalted One, a Buddha, even as I am now. He, by himself, will thoroughly know and see, as it were face to face, this universe, with Its worlds of the spirits, Its Brahmas and Its Maras, and Its world of recluses and Brahmins, of princes and peoples, even as I now, by myself, thoroughly know and see them.

— Digha Nikaya, 26

The text then foretells the birth of Maitreya Buddha in the city of Ketumatī in present-day Benares, whose king will be the Cakkavattī Sankha. Sankha will live in the former palace of King Mahāpanadā, and will become a renunciate who follows Maitreya.

In Mahayana Buddhism, Maitreya will attain bodhi in seven days, the minimum period, by virtue of his many lifetimes of preparation. Once Buddha, he will rule over the Ketumati Pure Land, an earthly paradise sometimes associated with the Indian city of Varanasi or Benares in present-day Uttar Pradesh. In Mahayana Buddhism, the Buddha presides over a land of purity. For example, Amitabha presides over Sukhavati, more popularly known as the "Western Paradise".

A notable teaching he will rediscover is that of the ten non-virtuous deeds—killing, stealing, sexual misconduct, lying, divisive speech, abusive speech, idle speech, covetousness, harmful intent and wrong views. The ten virtuous deeds will replace them with the abandonment of each of these practices. Edward Conze in his Buddhist Scriptures (1959) gives an account of Maitreya:

The Lord replied, 'Maitreya, the best of men, will then leave the Tuṣita heavens and go for his last rebirth. As soon as he is born he will walk seven steps forward, and where he puts down his feet a jewel or a lotus will spring up. He will raise his eyes to the ten directions and will speak these words: "This is my last birth. There will be no rebirth after this one. Never will I come back here, but, all pure, I shall win Nirvana."'

— Buddhist Scriptures

Maitreya currently resides in Tushita, but will come to Jambudvipa when needed most as successor to the historic Śākyamuni Buddha. Maitreya will achieve complete enlightenment during his lifetime, and following this reawakening he will bring back the timeless teaching of dharma to this plane and rediscover enlightenment. The Arya Maitreya Mandala, founded in 1933 by Lama Anagarika Govinda, is based on the idea of Maitreya.

Maitreya eschatology forms the central canon of the White Lotus Society, a religious and political movement which emerged in Yuan China. It later branched into the Chinese underground criminal organization known as the Triads, which exist today as an international underground criminal network.

Note that no description of Maitreya occurs in any other sutta in the canon, casting doubt as to the authenticity of the scripture. In addition, sermons of the Buddha normally are in response to a question, or in a specific context, but this sutta has a beginning and an ending, and its content is quite different from the others. This has led some to conclude that the whole sutta is apocryphal, or tampered with.

==== Sermon of the Seven Suns ====
In his "Sermon of the Seven Suns" in the Pali Canon, the Buddha describes the ultimate fate of the Earth in an apocalypse characterized by the consequent appearance of seven suns in the sky, each causing progressive ruin until the planet is destroyed:

All things are impermanent, all aspects of existence are unstable and non-eternal. Beings will become so weary and disgusted with the constituent things that they will seek emancipation from them more quickly. There will come a season, O monks when, after hundreds of thousands of years, rains will cease. All seedlings, all vegetation, all plants, grasses and trees will dry up and cease to be. ...There comes another season after a great lapse of time when a second sun will appear. Now all brooks and ponds will dry up, vanish, cease to be.

— Aňguttara-Nikăya, VII, 6.2 Pali Canon

The canon goes on to describe the progressive destruction of each sun. The third sun will dry the Ganges River and other rivers, whilst the fourth will cause the lakes to evaporate; the fifth will dry the oceans. Later:

Again after a vast period of time a sixth sun will appear, and it will bake the Earth even as a pot is baked by a potter. All the mountains will reek and send up clouds of smoke. After another great interval a seventh sun will appear and the Earth will blaze with fire until it becomes one mass of flame. The mountains will be consumed, a spark will be carried on the wind and go to the worlds of God. ...Thus, monks, all things will burn, perish and exist no more except those who have seen the path.

— Aňguttara-Nikăya, VII, 6.2 Pali Canon

The sermon completes with the Earth immersed into an extensive holocaust. The Pali Canon does not indicate when this will happen relative to Maitreya.

=== Norse mythology ===
1905 Paintings by Emil Doepler

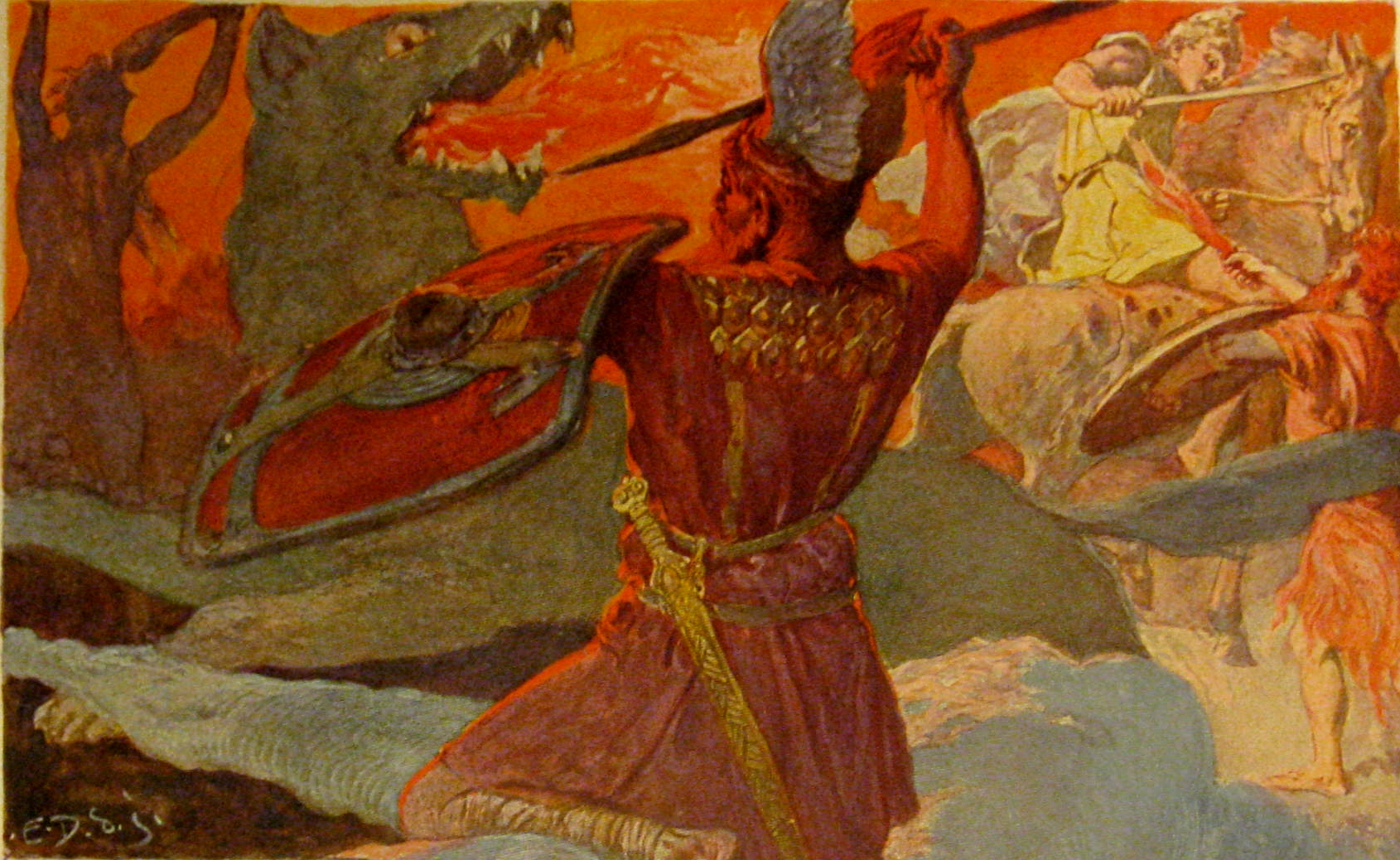
Odin fighting his old nemesis Fenrir

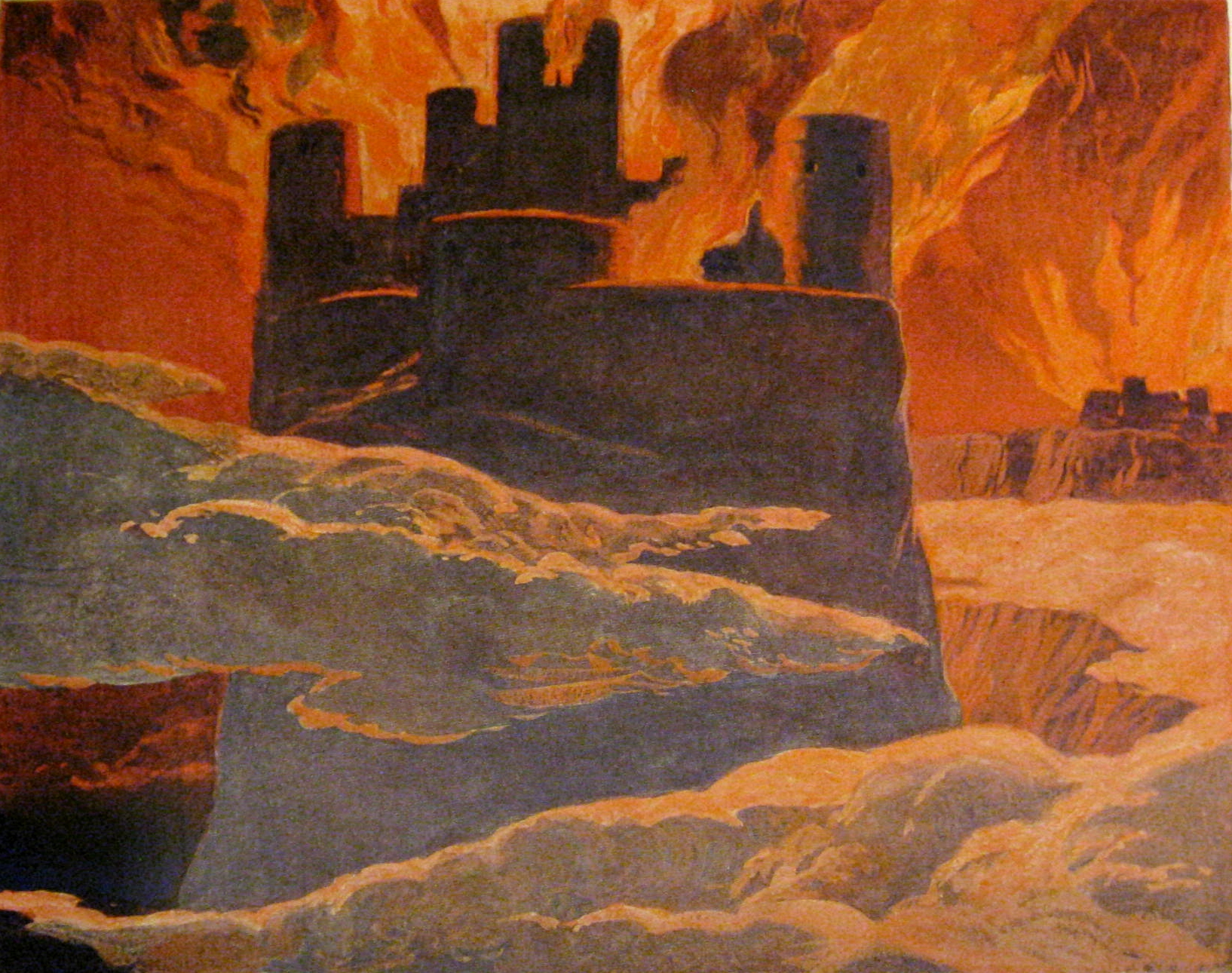
Ragnarök after Surtr has engulfed the world with fire

Norse mythology depicts the end of days as Ragnarök, an Old Norse term translatable as "twilight of the gods". It will be heralded by a devastation known as Fimbulvetr which will seize Midgard in cold and darkness. The sun and moon will disappear from the sky, and poison will fill the air. The dead will rise from the ground and there will be widespread despair.

Then there will be a battle between—on the one hand—the Gods with the Æsir, Vanir and Einherjar, led by Odin, and—on the other hand—forces of Chaos, including the fire giants and jötunn, led by Loki. In the fighting Odin will be swallowed whole by his old nemesis Fenrir. The god Freyr fights Surtr but loses. Víðarr, son of Odin, will then avenge his father by ripping Fenrir's jaws apart and stabbing the wolf in the heart with his spear. The serpent Jörmungandr will open its gaping maw and be met in combat by Thor. Thor, also a son of Odin, will defeat the serpent, only to take nine steps afterwards before collapsing in his own death.

After this people will flee their homes as the sun blackens and the earth sinks into the sea. The stars will vanish, steam will rise, and flames will touch the heavens. This conflict will result in the deaths of most of the major Gods and forces of Chaos. Finally, Surtr will fling fire across the nine worlds. The ocean will then completely submerge Midgard.

After the cataclysm, the world will resurface new and fertile, and the surviving Gods will meet. Baldr, another son of Odin, will be reborn in the new world, according to Völuspá. The two human survivors, Líf and Lífþrasir, will then repopulate this new earth.

=== Egyptian mythology ===
Egyptian texts typically treat the dissolution of the world as a possibility to be avoided, and for that reason they do not often describe it in detail. However, many texts allude to the idea that the world, after countless cycles of renewal, is destined to end. This end is described in a passage in the Coffin Texts and a more explicit one in the Book of the Dead, in which Atum says that he will one day dissolve the ordered world and return to his primeval, inert state within the waters of chaos. All things other than the creator will cease to exist, except Osiris, who will survive along with him. Details about this eschatological prospect are left unclear, including the fate of the dead who are associated with Osiris. Yet with the creator god and the god of renewal together in the waters that gave rise to the orderly world, there is the potential for a new creation to arise in the same manner as the old.

== No end times ==
=== Taoism ===
The Taoist faith is not concerned with what came before or after life, knowing only their own being in the Tao. The philosophy is that people come and go, just like mountains, trees and stars, but Tao will go on for time immemorial.

== Analogies in science and philosophy ==
A diagram showing the life cycle of the Sun

Researchers in futures studies and transhumanists investigate how the accelerating rate of scientific progress may lead to a "technological singularity" in the future that would profoundly and unpredictably change the course of human history, and result in Homo sapiens no longer being the dominant life form on Earth.

Occasionally the term "physical eschatology" is applied to the long-term predictions of astrophysics about the future of Earth and ultimate fate of the universe. In approximately 6 billion years, the Sun will turn into a red giant. Life on Earth will become impossible due to a rise in temperature long before the planet is possibly actually swallowed up by the Sun or left charred. Later, the Sun will become a white dwarf.

== See also ==
- Ancient Aztec eschatology
- Cosmogony
- Eschatology (religious movement)
- Future of Earth
- Four kingdoms of Daniel
- Götterdämmerung
- Immanentize the eschaton
- Last Roman Emperor
- List of conspiracy theories
- List of dates predicted for apocalyptic events
- List of eschatological topics
- Millenarianism
- Messianism
- The Pocket Guide to the Apocalypse
- Ussher chronology
- Whore of Babylon

== Sources ==
- Carroll, John T. (2000). "Eschatology". In Freedman, David Noel; Myers, Allen C. (eds.). Eerdmans Dictionary of the Bible. Eerdmans. ISBN 978-9053565032.
- Dunand, Françoise; Zivie-Coche, Christiane (2004) [French edition 1991]. Gods and Men in Egypt: 3000 BCE to 395 CE. Translated by David Lorton. Cornell University Press. ISBN 0-8014-8853-2.
- Hornung, Erik (1982) [German edition 1971]. Conceptions of God in Egypt: The One and the Many. Translated by John Baines. Cornell University Press. ISBN 0-8014-1223-4.
- Meeks, Dimitri; Favard-Meeks, Christine (1996) [French edition 1993]. Daily Life of the Egyptian Gods. Translated by G. M. Goshgarian. Cornell University Press. ISBN 0-8014-8248-8.
