= The Pocket Guide to the Apocalypse =

Book

The Pocket Guide to the Apocalypse: The Official Field Manual for the End of the World, written by Jason Boyett and published by Relevant Books, is a caricature of eschatology, the apocalypse, and the end times.

== Contents ==
Chapters in the book include:

- the "Apocalyptionary" (a glossary of The End)
- "The End is Near" (a timeline of failed end-of-the-world predictions)
- "Know Your Potential Antichrists" (a gallery of Antichrist candidates)
- "Fun with Eschatology" (an introduction to apocalyptic theory)
- "Armageddon Grab-Bag"
