= Chillegorism =

Millenarian doctrine the opposite of Chiliasm

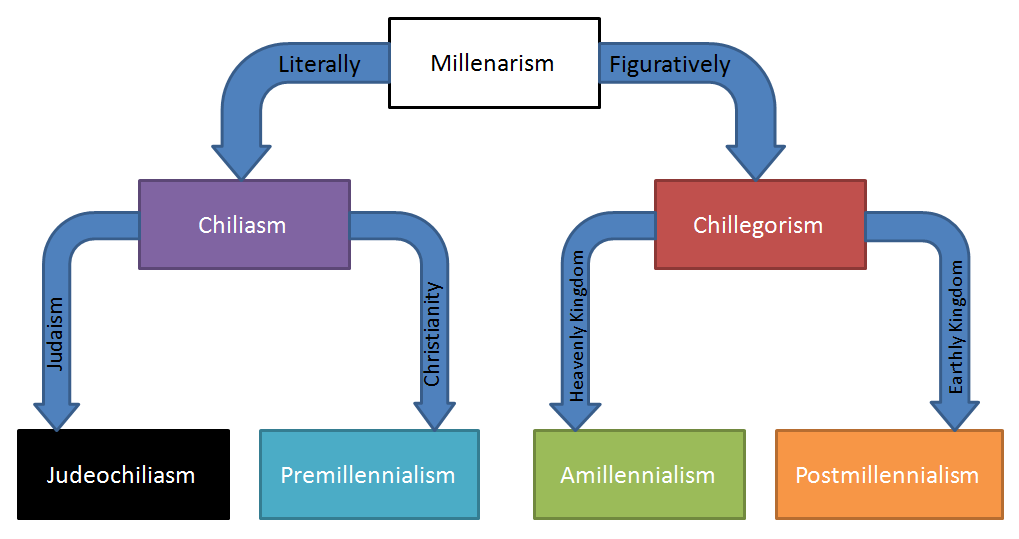
Millenarism and its varieties

Chillegorism (Ancient Greek: χιλιάς, chilias, 'one thousand' and ἀλληγορία, alligoría, 'allegory') is a millenarian doctrine which is the opposite of chiliasm. It is based on a figurative interpretation of the prophecy of Revelation 20:1–4 about the millennial reign of Christ together with the righteous.

== Definition ==
Chillegorism does not fall under one general definition acceptable to its adepts, and it is difficult to come up with a summary of this doctrine. To understand the diversity of chillegorical approaches, it makes sense to consider the classification of chillegorism in its main forms.

The two types of chillegorism are postmillennialism and amillennialism. Postmillennialism, or postmillenarism, is a type of chillegorism which teaches that the Second Coming of Christ will occur after the millennial reign of the righteous; the reign here is understood as something already happening or something that will happen in the future. In postmillennialism, the Millennium is seen as not exactly 1,000 years but as an extended period of some limited duration.

Amillennialism is a type of chillegorism which teaches that there will be no millennial reign of the righteous on earth. Amillennialists interpret the thousand years symbolically to refer either to a temporary bliss of souls in heaven before the general resurrection, or to the infinite bliss of the righteous after the general resurrection.

Some researchers see no fundamental difference between postmillennialism and amillennialism, both being equivalent to chillegorism.

== See also ==
- Christian eschatology
- Millenarianism
- Premillennialism
- Summary of Christian eschatological differences
