= Jerome de Prado =

Spanish Jesuit Biblical scholar and exegete

Jerome de Prado (Hieronymi Pradi, 1547 – 13 January 1595) was a Spanish Jesuit Biblical scholar and exegete who interpreted the Book of Ezekiel.

== Life ==
Prado was born in Baeza, Spain. He entered the Society of Jesus in 1572; taught literature; and then filled the chair of scripture at Cordoba, Spain for sixteen years.

Prado died in Rome, where he had traveled to seek illustrations for his commentary on Ezekiel.

Among those whom Prado inspired with his thoroughness and enthusiasm in the study of the Bible were his pupils John Pineda and Luis de Alcazar.

== Works ==
Prado's magnum opus was the Tomus Primus in Ezechiel (fol. pp. 360; Rome, 1596), which he worked on for sixteen years. At the time of his death, he had reached the twenty-sixth chapter. The work was finished by John Baptist Villalpando, who added two volumes.

Commentaries on Isaiah, Zachary, Micah, and the Epistle to the Hebrews, as well as a book on biblical chronology, are among the manuscripts left by Prado, several of which are in the National Library of Madrid. The volumes published by Villalpando were dedicated to Philip II of Spain, at whose request and cost the work begun by Prado was brought to a successful completion. These three volumes include a thorough and scientific study of Jewish coins, weights, and measures; and a reconstruction of the Temple and the City of Jerusalem from the very few data at hand. Cardinal Nicholas Wiseman found the work of Prado to be "still the greatest repertory to which every modern scholiast must recur, in explaining the difficulties of the book". The younger Rosenmüller calls these volumes "a work replete with varied erudition, and most useful to the study of antiquity".
