= Luis del Alcázar =

Spanish Jesuit theologian (1554–1613)

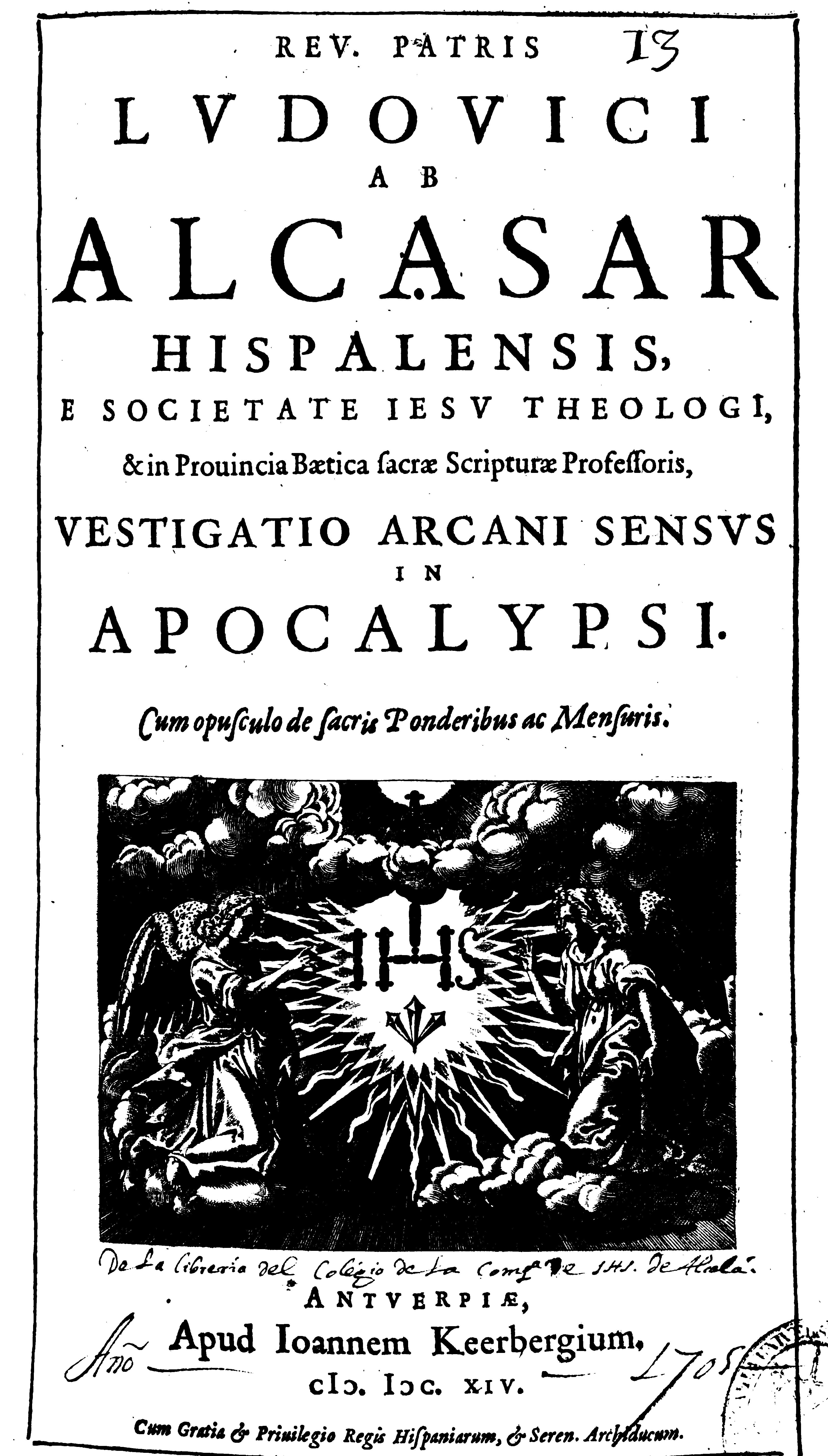
Title page from the Vestigatio of Luis del Alcázar (1614).

Luis del Alcázar, SJ (1554 – 1613) was a Spanish Jesuit theologian and a major figure in the development of Christian eschatology. He was known for popularizing the preterist perspective.

== Life ==
He was the eldest son of Melchor del Alcázar, a jurist, and nephew of the poet Baltasar del Alcázar, and was born in Seville. He studied at Seville, Cordova and Salamanca, entered the Society of Jesus in 1568, and became a priest in 1578. Alcázar was a friend of the Jesuit Juan de Pineda (1552–1637) (also a pupil of Jerome de Prado), and the Dominican Agustin Salucio; he died in Rome.

== Works ==
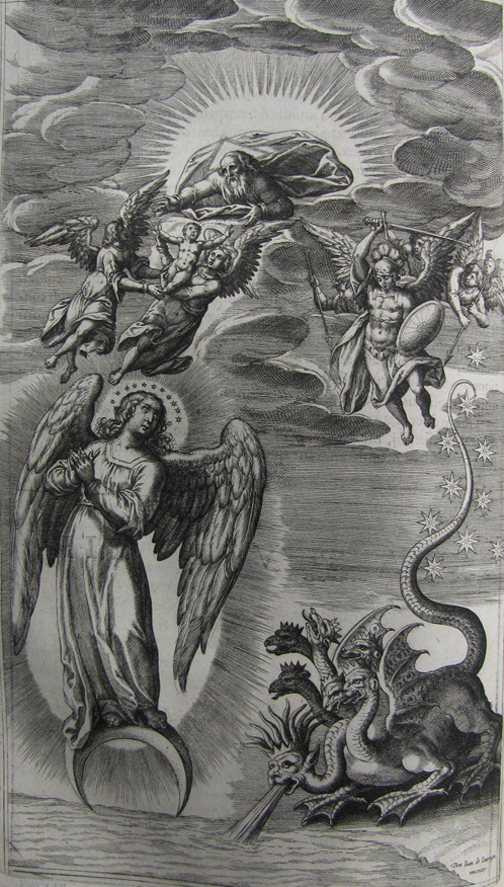
Illustration from the Vestigatio, showing the Woman of the Apocalypse.

He is known for his Vestigatio arcani sensus in Apocalypsi (1614) published after his death, putting forward what would later be called a preterist view of Biblical prophecy, in commentary on the Book of Revelation; his work is regarded as the first major application of the method of interpretation of prophecy by reading in terms of the author's contemporary concerns. His view was that everything in the Apocalypse, apart from the three final chapters, referred to events that had already come to pass when John of Patmos was writing. He attacked Joachim of Fiore, in particular, for millenarianism. The book's illustrations were after Juan de Jáuregui y Aguilar, who produced a series of 24 designs on the Apocalypse. He suggested that 2 Esdras was later than Revelation, and borrowed from it.

A further work was In eas Veteris Testamenti partes quas respicit Apocalypsis (1631).

== Influence ==
Alcázar's method was for the Book of Revelation, and was shortly taken up by Hugo Grotius. John Donne cites him in a sermon. Henry Hammond was an exception, among English Protestants, in following Alcázar's interpretation. Alcázar, with Johann Heinrich Heidegger, is referenced in Tristram Shandy as "Lewis de Acasar".

He was a friend of Francisco Pacheco, and had an influence on the iconography of the Immaculate Conception: the horns of the crescent moon in Pacheco's codification pointed away from the sun, as Alcázar and Galileo argued.
