= Max King (theologian) =

American theologian (1930–2023)

Max R. King (born 1930 – February 25, 2023) was the founder of the school of thought known as "transmillennialism". King was a minister in the Churches of Christ for 40 years before developing Transmillennialism.

King pioneered a field of theology that he termed "covenant eschatology" which most call full preterism. Within fundamentalist and conservative evangelical contexts, he contended that biblical eschatology was not related to the end of the space-time universe, but to the transition of the Old Covenant to the New Covenant. King offered a unique interpretation concerning the millennium as found in Revelation 20 as pertaining to the forty-year period from 30-70 AD. He called this time "the transition period" from Old Covenant to New Covenant. In King's view, this transition opened the way for the full presence of God to dwell with all of humanity. To describe this relationship, King coined the phrase "Comprehensive Grace."

King's transmillennialism emerged in the late 1990s as an alternative to dispensational premillennialism, amillennialism or postmillennialism. It differentiated itself from Reformed preterism and Christian reconstructionism in view of postmodern issues facing the emerging church and the need to forward its scholarship in the context of historical Jesus studies. In King's view, the covenantal transformation of the first century serves as a model for personal, organizational and societal transformation today. King's first major book, The Spirit of Prophecy, was published in 1971. He published a monthly print journal, The Living Presence, for 15 years; it is currently available in electronic format. King's annual "Covenant Eschatology Seminar" spanned the 1990s and continued through the early 2000s as the "Transmillennial" national conference. Some of King's other major works include Old Covenant Israel and New Covenant Salvation and The Cross and The Parousia of Christ. His work has now attracted the attention of Spiral Dynamics practitioners like Don Edward Beck, interspiritual pioneers like Kurt Johnson, and Integral theorists like Ken Wilber. Max's final book, Irrevocable, which is a study of Romans 9-11 purports to do for realized soteriology what his previous works did for realized eschatology, came out in 2019.

King's "full preterist" position was and still is widely criticized by churchmen, including R. C. Sproul, for denying hope of bodily resurrection of the dead, or indeed any hope for those living after AD70.

King lived in Dacula, Georgia, USA. His organization was Presence International, of which his son, Doug King, is President. King died on February 25, 2023.

== Realized eschatology ==
Presence International, a non-profit organization based in the metro Atlanta area, holds annual conferences that teach that all prophecy was fulfilled, including the second coming of Christ, the resurrection of the dead and the Last Judgement, by the year A.D. 70 at the destruction of Jerusalem by the Romans. With the New Covenant fully established, all of humanity has been reconciled with God. This view of Universal reconciliation is referred to as comprehensive grace.
