= Eschatology (religious movement) =

New Thought denominational movement

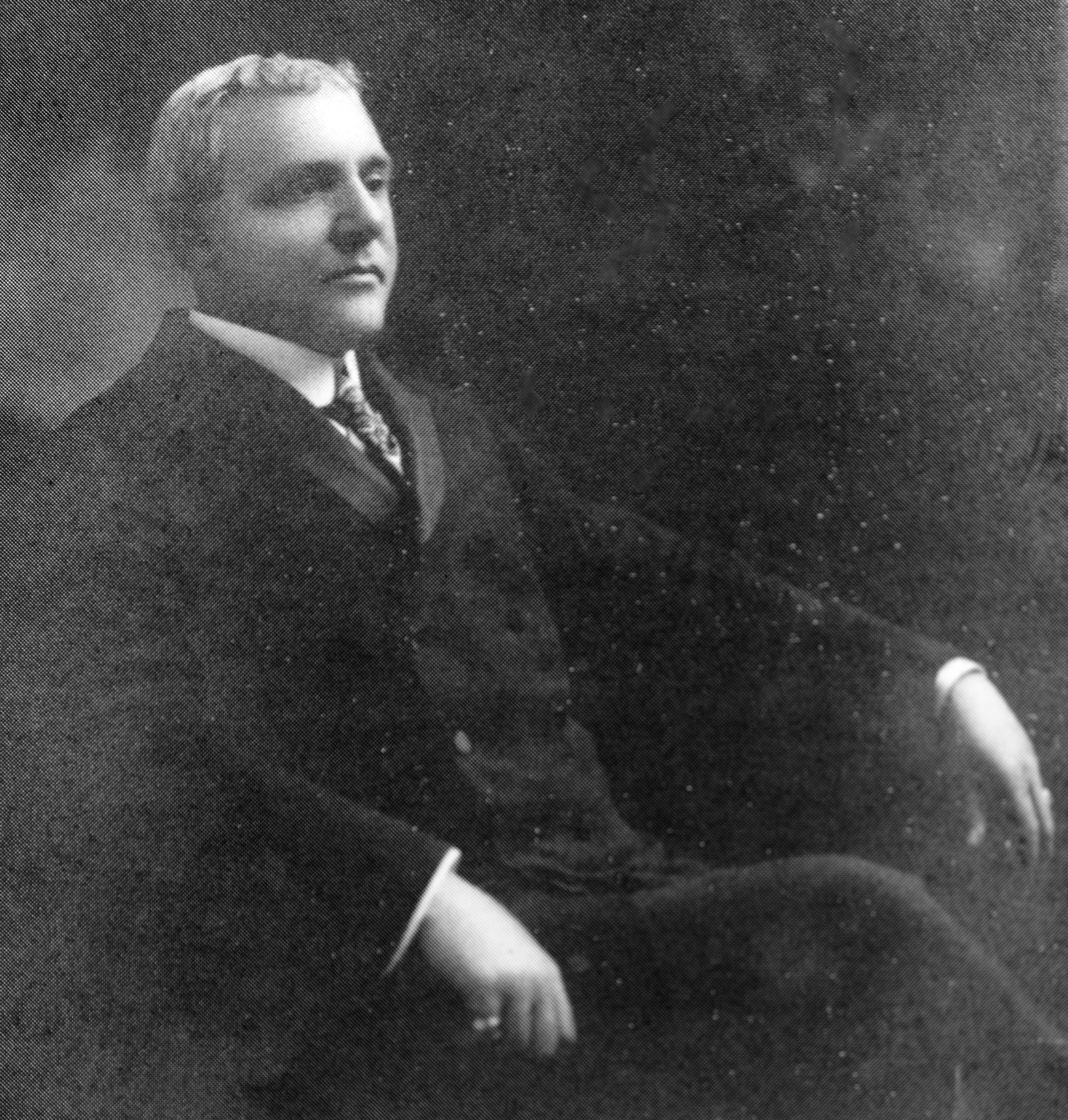
William Wilfred Walter

Eschatology is a New Thought movement founded by American writer and former practitioner William W. Walter. Walter was formally a member of the Catholic Church and then The First Church of Christ, Scientist until 1912 when he rejected organized religion in order to found his own metaphysical system. Although it is generally classified as a new religious movement, Walter did not see it as a religious movement, and his followers reject the association with religion. He originally named his organization "The Walter Method of Christian Science"; and the term Eschatology as a trademark for Walter's teaching was not used until the 1920s.

Walter died in 1941, but some groups following his teaching have survived and remain active; mostly in the United States, particularly in California, and in Mexico.

== William W. Walter ==
William Wilfred Walter was born in Sublette, Illinois on July 13, 1869. Raised in a Catholic family, as a teenager he started to visit other church denominations. He left home at seventeen and moved to Aurora, Illinois. He later returned home and bought a barber shop. There he learned the trade, but soon after returned to his former job in Aurora and at twenty-one married his fiancée Barbara Stenger. The couple had a son who became sick and handicapped. The boy was fourteen when Walter became involved in the Christian Science church. At twenty-seven Walter was a buyer in a department store, a job he held the rest of his life. He never obtained formal education and had fishing as a hobby. The condition of the son depressed him and by thirty Walter caught tuberculosis. In his writings he claims that after seven years of struggling using the Christian Science healing techniques he finally overcame his illness. Walter thus became involved in trying to heal others as a Christian Science practitioner.

Between 1907 and 1910 he wrote three novels about mental healing for his clients and also for people outside the church. In 1910 Walter published The Christ Way under a pseudonym, in which he presented Christian Science concepts without mentioning the religion itself or Mary Baker Eddy, the founder of the church. The book was relatively rejected by church members but widely accepted by outsiders. Walter reprinted the book, this time with his real name.

Between 1912 and 1916 Walter wrote several more books. In 1916 he also published his first Plain Talk series booklets, which heavily drew upon Eddy's teaching while adding many of his own ideas. In 1917 Walter held a class at his home for his closest followers and started a teaching plan for his "Walter Method of Christ Science." He also continued to publish books and booklets for his successive courses. By 1920 some of his students started teaching new students, though Walter always examined them. Walter stipulated that each teacher requested an annual renewal of a permit that he alone granted. He called his teaching "the Science of Eschatology" and, like Eddy did before, claimed that the science was taught by Jesus. However, unlike Eddy, Walter rejected Christianity as a religion and never founded a church: he restrained himself to teach the "Science of Life" at his home: a phrase he took freely from Eddy.

In the final chapter of The Sharp Sickle, the official textbook of Eschatology published in 1928, Walter, who had written The Sickle a decade before, sees the biblical book of Revelation as prophesying his own work, but didn't claim any special mission from a personal God:

"You might ask how he could know that the individual who unveiled his Revelation would bring it out in two volumes. John knew that the individual who would gain sufficient understanding to do the unveiling would also have wisdom enough to be guided by his great wisdom."

Although Walter claimed that it is impossible "to have a leader without a follower" he remained the sole leader of Eschatology. In 1941 Walter died suddenly at 72 at his home in St. Petersburg, Florida. He was survived by his wife and his son Arthur.

Mr. Walter stated in his booklet Our Plan that "the Walter Method, which is nothing more or less than a plain and practical explanation and application of the method of mental healing given the present age by Mary Baker Eddy, and the further unfoldment of actual life as taught in the science of last things, Eschatology."

== Beliefs of Eschatology ==
Since William Walter, who founded Eschatology, was a former Christian Scientist, there are some doctrines which are shared by the two groups, though there are also many doctrinal differences as well. For instance, both groups believe in the Bible and differ from fundamentalists in that they regard the Bible as having a symbolic meaning in addition to a literal one; they reject the physical existence of hell as eternal damnation; and they also both regard Mary Baker Eddy as the re-discoverer of the "Science of Life" which they believe was taught by Jesus but lost in early Christianity, and consider that Jesus healed by his knowledge of a Science of Life. However, Walter also rejected much of what Eddy wrote, especially her theism. Walter's system strongly rejects the belief in a personal god. In the chapter "Experiments and experiences" of The Sickle Walter confess the extreme tribulation, or "mental warfare" as he called it, that he endured in the process of abandoning theism. As a result Walter and the Eschatologists' view of God are much closer to New Thought and the New Age movements than to Christian Science and Christianity; and The Walter Method is generally grouped with other New Thought groups such as the Church of Integration, the Infinite Way, and the Church of the Higher Life.

Walter also believed in the existence of various controversial phenomena (such as what is generally known in the secular world as psychokinesis or telekinesis) and believed that these psychic abilities can supposedly be developed to the point of conquering old age and even death. He also believed that suffering, especially disease, occurs mentally first in belief, or fear in the reality of the problem, (what he called "wrong thinking") before being manifest on the body. Walter also developed the notion that after Eddy's death a conspiracy within the Christian Science church veiled the original meaning of the book Science and Health with Key to the Scriptures. Throughout his later career Walter maintained that in her unaltered writings Eddy's notion of God was nontheistic and that, after the alteration, the writings were given a theistic taint. However, there is no evidence that Eddy rejected the belief in a personal God; and Christian Scientists point to the fact that there is no evidence of alterations from Eddy's texts, since the editions of the texts printed before and after Eddy's death are the same.

Regarding the similarities between Eschatology and other metaphysical systems, in his 1993 book, the author Martin Gardner wrote that he "was astonished by the extent to which today's New Age fantasies were so thoroughly aired a hundred years ago by New Thought leaders."

== Eschatology after Walter ==
After Walter's unexpected death in 1941 the movement fell into confusion. Eventually Genevieve L. Rader, who began her study with Walter in 1921, continued his work. In the early 1960s she moved the organization's headquarters from Aurora, Illinois to Pacific Palisades in California. Rader wrote the Questions and Answers commentary to Walter's four stages in the teaching of Eschatology: the Beginners Course, The Sickle Course, the Primary Notes Course and The Sharp Sickle Course. She also delivered the annual Teacher's Graduate Course. In July 1981 Rader relinquished the responsibility of Director of Teaching and was succeeded by her secretary, Evelyn Durling. In July 1987, at Durling's recommendation, Marjorie D. Westad was appointed as her successor, and in August 1998 Westad recommended Bruce C. Smith, then Debby Clark, the current Director of Eschatology.

From the 1970s through the 21st century the movement has continued to exist in other countries, particularly in Mexico.

In May 2001, Juan del Río, founder of a school based on Eschatology teachings in Mexico City and author of Sánate a ti mismo (How to heal yourself) died of cancer after a four-year battle with the disease.
