= Amillennialism =

Belief that there will be no millennial reign of the righteous on Earth

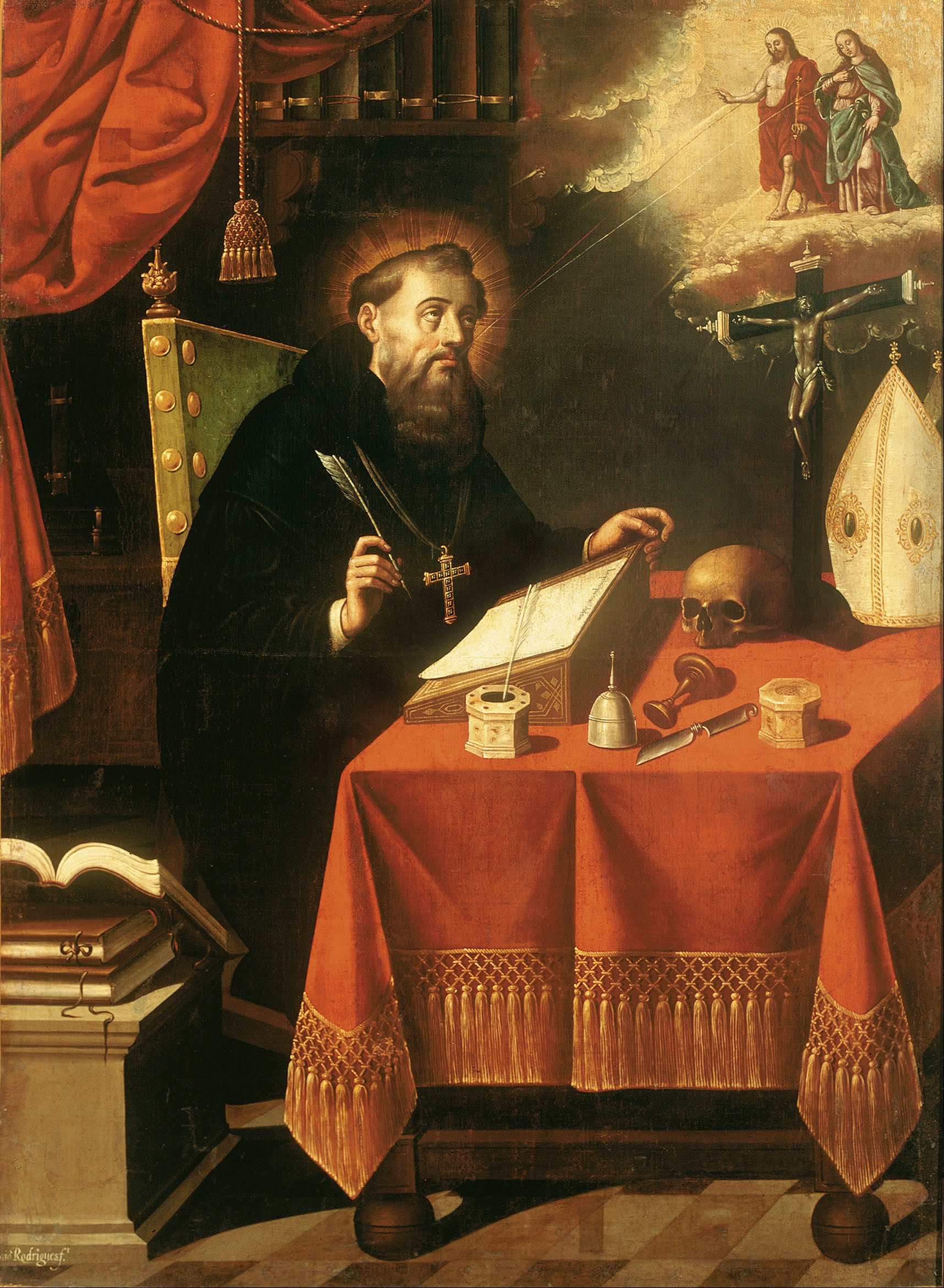
Augustine of Hippo was an amillennialist.

Amillennialism or amillenarism is a chillegoristic eschatological position in Christianity which holds that there will be no millennial reign of the righteous on Earth. This view contrasts with both postmillennial and, especially, with premillennial interpretations of Revelation 20 and various other prophetic and eschatological passages of the Bible.

Revelation 20:1–6 describes a vision in which, "for a thousand years", Satan is bound "so that he might not deceive the nations any longer", and "the souls of those who had been beheaded for the testimony of Jesus and for the word of God, and those who had not worshiped the beast or its image and had not received its mark ... came to life and reigned with Christ for a thousand years." Amillennialists interpret the "thousand years" symbolically to refer either to a temporary bliss of souls in heaven before the general resurrection, or to the infinite bliss of the righteous after the general resurrection, in the eternal state.

Amilennialists reject the view that Jesus Christ will physically reign on the Earth for exactly one thousand years. Rather, they interpret the "thousand years" mentioned in Revelation 20 as a symbolic number, not as a literal duration of time. Amillennialists hold that the millennium has already begun and is simultaneous with the current church age. Amillennialism holds that while Christ's reign during the millennium is spiritual in nature, at the end of the church age, Christ will return in final judgment and establish a permanent reign in the "new heaven and new Earth".

Many proponents dislike the term "amillennialism" because it emphasizes their differences with premillennialism rather than their beliefs about the millennium. "Amillennial" was actually coined in a pejorative way by those who hold premillennial views. Some proponents also prefer alternate names such as nunc-millennialism (that is, now-millennialism) or realized millennialism, although these other names have achieved only limited acceptance and usage.

It is the mainstream view in most Christian denominations, such as the Churches of the East, Oriental Orthodoxy, Eastern Orthodoxy, Roman Catholicism, Old Catholicism, Lutheranism, and Anglicanism, as well as in some Reformed, Methodist and Baptist traditions, and the Stone-Campbell movement.

== Variations ==
There are two main variations of amillennianism, perfect amillenarism (the first resurrection has already happened) and imperfect amillenarism (the first resurrection will happen simultaneously with the second one). The common denominator for all amillenaristic views is the denial of the Kingdom of the righteous on Earth before the general resurrection.

=== Perfect amillenarism ===
- Marcion (c. 85 – 160) taught that only souls will resurrect, rejecting the bodily resurrection. He followed the teachings of Simon Magus (1st century) and Cerdo (1st–2nd centuries) [See. St. Irenaeus of Lyons, Against Heresies, 1, 27; St. Epiphanius of Cyprus, Panarion. Against the Marcionites, Heresies 22 and 42].
- Origen (c. 185 – 254) further developed the amillenarism of Marcion in his teaching about the reign of the saints in heaven while rejecting the idea of the Kingdom of the righteous coming down to the Earth [On the First Principles, book 2, chapter 11; Against Celsus, book 2, chapter 5]. This teaching was later supported by Gaius of Rome (died c. 217) [See Eusebius], St. Dionysius of Alexandria (died 265) [See Eusebius], and Eusebius of Caesarea (c. 263 – 340) [Church History, volume 3, chapter 28; volume 7, chapters 24-25].
- Emanuel Swedenborg (1688–1772) taught about the reign of saints in heaven but denied the bodily resurrection [The Open Apocalypse, chapter 20].
- A.P. Lopukhin's Explanatory Bible (Russian: Толковая Библия Лопухина) (1904–1913) argues that the first resurrection refers to the state of the righteous souls reigning in heaven, that is, "they can be guides and helpers to the Christians who are still fighting the good fight of faith on the earth. The souls find in this a new source of joy and blessing."
- Joseph Sickenberger (20th century) interprets the first resurrection as the ascension of the souls of martyrs into heaven. The Millennium is for him "a symbolic number".
- Charles Homer Giblin and Tadros Malaty (20th century) see the Millennium as the life of saints in heaven.
- Daniil Sysoev (1974–2009) taught that the first resurrection is the life and reign of the righteous souls in heaven.

=== Imperfect amillenarism ===
- According to Epiphanius of Salamis, writing between 374 and 377, the gnostic Cerinthus (1st–2nd centuries) believed that Jesus Christ "ha[d] not yet risen but will rise when the general resurrection of the dead takes place." [See Epiphanius of Salamis, Panarion, 8 and 28, §6]. Thus, Cerinthus—whom Epiphanius charged with heresy—allegedly denied a distinct first resurrection. At the same time, he is said to have held that "Jesus suffered and rose from the dead, but Christ, who had descended upon Him, went up to heaven without suffering. And the one who came down from heaven in the form of a dove is Christ, but Jesus is not Christ." [ibid., §1; St. Irenaeus of Lyons, Against Heresies, book 1, chapter 26].
- Ephrem the Syrian (c. 306 – 373) believed that the first resurrection would occur simultaneously with the second and both would constitute "one resurrection". The Millennium signifies "the immensity of eternal life" [Discourse 96. On repentance].
- Theodoret of Cyrrhus (386–457) expressed similar views on the Millennium to those of Ephrem's. [A Brief Exposition of Divine Dogmas, chapter 21].

== Teaching ==
Amillennialism rejects the idea of a future millennium in which Christ will reign on Earth prior to the eternal state beginning, but holds:

- that Jesus is presently reigning from heaven, seated at the right hand of God the Father;
- that Jesus also is and will remain with the church until the end of the world, as he promised at the Ascension;
- that the millennium began with the resurrection of Jesus, the first resurrection (Colossians 1:18 [Jesus Christ] is the beginning, the firstborn from the dead; that in all things he might have the preeminence; Revelation 20:4-6 [the millennium] is the first resurrection);
- that at Pentecost (or days earlier, at the Ascension of Jesus), the millennium began, citing Acts 2:16-21, wherein Peter quotes Joel 2:28-32 on the coming of the kingdom, to explain what is happening; and
- that, therefore the Church and its spread of the gospel is Christ's Kingdom and forever will be.

Amillennialists also cite scripture passages that they believe to indicate that the kingdom of God is not a physical realm. Several verses cited by amillennialists in this context are:

- Matthew 12:28, where Jesus cites his driving out of demons as evidence that the kingdom of God had come upon them;
- Luke 17:20–21, where Jesus warns that the coming of the kingdom of God cannot be observed, and that it is among them; and
- Romans 14:17, where Paul speaks of the kingdom of God being in terms of the Christians' actions.

=== Interpretation of Revelation ===
Because amillennialists believe that the millennium is simultaneous with the present age, they also believe that the binding of Satan in Revelation 20, which occurs at the beginning of the millennium, has already occurred; in their view, he has been prevented from "deceiv[ing] the nations" by the spread of the gospel. Nonetheless, they maintain that good and evil will remain mixed in strength throughout history and even in the church, according to the amillennial understanding of the Parable of the Wheat and Tares.

Amillennialism is usually associated with Idealism, as both schools teach a symbolic interpretation of many of the prophecies of the Bible and especially of the Book of Revelation. Some amillennialists may also adhere to partial preterism, acknowledging the possibility that the Great Tribulation was fulfilled in the First Jewish-Roman War or the persecution of Christians in the Roman Empire; however, many amillennialists do believe that the Church awaits prophecies such as the Parousia and last judgement to come; they simply disagree with Millennialists about how or when these prophecies will be fulfilled.

== History ==
Comparison of Christian millennial interpretations. Some amillenniallists, such as Roman Catholics, believe in a scenario close to Post-tribulational Premillennialism, but with the Antichrist taking the place of the second coming in the timeline, the millennium after Antichrist being symbolic, and the second coming occurring at the same time as the last judgment.

=== Early church ===
Few early Christians wrote about this aspect of eschatology during the first century of Christianity, but most of the available writings from the period reflect a millenarianist perspective (sometimes referred to as chiliasm). Bishop Papias of Hierapolis (A.D. 70–155) speaks in favor of a pre-millennial position in volume three of his five volume work. Aristion and the elder John echoed his sentiments, as did other first-hand disciples and secondary followers. Though most writings of the time tend to favor a millennial perspective, the amillennial position may have also been present in this early period, as suggested in the Epistle of Barnabas, and it would become the ascendant view during the next two centuries. Church Fathers of the third century who rejected the millennium included Clement of Alexandria (c. 150 – c. 215), Origen (184/185 – 253/254), and Cyprian (c. 200 – 258). Justin Martyr (died 165), who had chiliastic tendencies in his theology, mentions differing views in his Dialogue with Trypho the Jew, chapter 80:

"I and many others are of this opinion [premillennialism], and [believe] that such will take place, as you assuredly are aware; but, on the other hand, I signified to you that many who belong to the pure and pious faith, and are true Christians, think otherwise."

Certain amillennialists, such as Albertus Pieters, understand Pseudo-Barnabas to be amillennial, though many understand it instead to be premillennial. In the 2nd century, the Alogi (those who rejected all of John's writings) were amillennial, as was Caius in the first quarter of the 3rd century. With the influence of Neo-Platonism and dualism, Clement of Alexandria and Origen denied premillennialism. Likewise, Dionysius of Alexandria (died 264) argued that Revelation was not written by John and could not be interpreted literally; he was amillennial.

Origen's idealizing tendency to consider only the spiritual as real (which was fundamental to his entire system) led him to combat the "rude" or "crude" Chiliasm of a physical and sensual beyond.

Premillennialism appeared in the available writings of the early church, but it was evident that both views existed side by side. The premillennial beliefs of the early church fathers, however, are quite different from the dominant form of modern-day premillennialism, namely dispensational premillennialism.

It is the conclusion of this thesis that Dr. Ryrie's statement [that the early church fathers held dispensationalist views] is historically invalid within the chronological framework of this thesis. The reasons for this conclusion are as follows: (1) the writers/writings surveyed did not generally adopt a consistently applied literal interpretation; (2) they did not generally distinguish between the Church and Israel; (3) there is no evidence that they generally held to a dispensational view of revealed history; (4) although Papias and Justin Martyr did believe in a Millennial kingdom, the 1,000 years is the only basic similarity with the modern system (in fact, they and dispensational pre-millennialism radically differ on the basis of the Millennium); (5) they had no concept of imminency or of a pre-tribulational Rapture of the Church; (6) in general, their eschatological chronology is not synonymous with that of the modern system. Indeed, this thesis would conclude that the eschatological beliefs of the period studied would be generally inimical to those of the modern system (perhaps, seminal amillennialism, and not nascent dispensational premillennialism ought to be seen in the eschatology of the period).

=== Medieval and Reformation periods ===
Amillennialism gained ground after Christianity became a legal religion. It was systematized by Augustine of Hippo in the 4th century, and this systematization carried amillennialism over as the dominant eschatology of the Medieval and Reformation periods. Augustine was originally a premillennialist, but he retracted that view, claiming the doctrine was carnal.

Amillennialism was the dominant view of the Protestant Reformers. The Lutheran Church formally rejected chiliasm in The Augsburg Confession—"Art. XVII., and condemned the Anabaptists (historically, most Anabaptist groups were amillennial) and others 'who now scatter Jewish opinions that, before the resurrection of the dead, the godly shall occupy the kingdom of the world, the wicked being everywhere suppressed.'" Likewise, the Swiss Reformer Heinrich Bullinger wrote up the Second Helvetic Confession, which asserts, "We also reject the Jewish dream of a millennium, or golden age on earth, before the last judgment." John Calvin wrote in Institutes of the Christian Religion that chiliasm is a "fiction" that is "too childish either to need or to be worth a refutation." He interpreted the thousand-year period of Revelation 20 symbolically, applying it to the "various disturbances that awaited the church, while still toiling on earth."

=== Modern times ===
The Eastern and Oriental Orthodox Churches have long held amillennial positions, as has the Catholic Church, which generally embraces an Augustinian eschatology and which has deemed that premillennialism "cannot safely be taught." Amillennialism is also common among Protestant denominations such as the Lutheran, Reformed, Anglican, Methodist, and many Messianic Jews. Amillennialism represents the historical position of the Amish, Old Order Mennonite, and Conservative Mennonites (though among the more modern groups premillennialism has made inroads). Amillennialism is common among groups arising from the 19th century American Restoration Movement such as the Churches of Christ, Christian Church (Disciples of Christ) and Christian Churches and Churches of Christ. Amillennialism also has a following amongst Baptist denominations such as The Association of Grace Baptist Churches in England. Partial preterism is sometimes a component of amillennial hermeneutics. Amillennialism declined in Protestant circles with the rise of Postmillennialism and the resurgence of Premillennialism in the 18th and 19th centuries, but amillennialism has regained prominence in the West after World War II.

== See also ==
- Millenarianism
