= List of dates predicted for apocalyptic events =

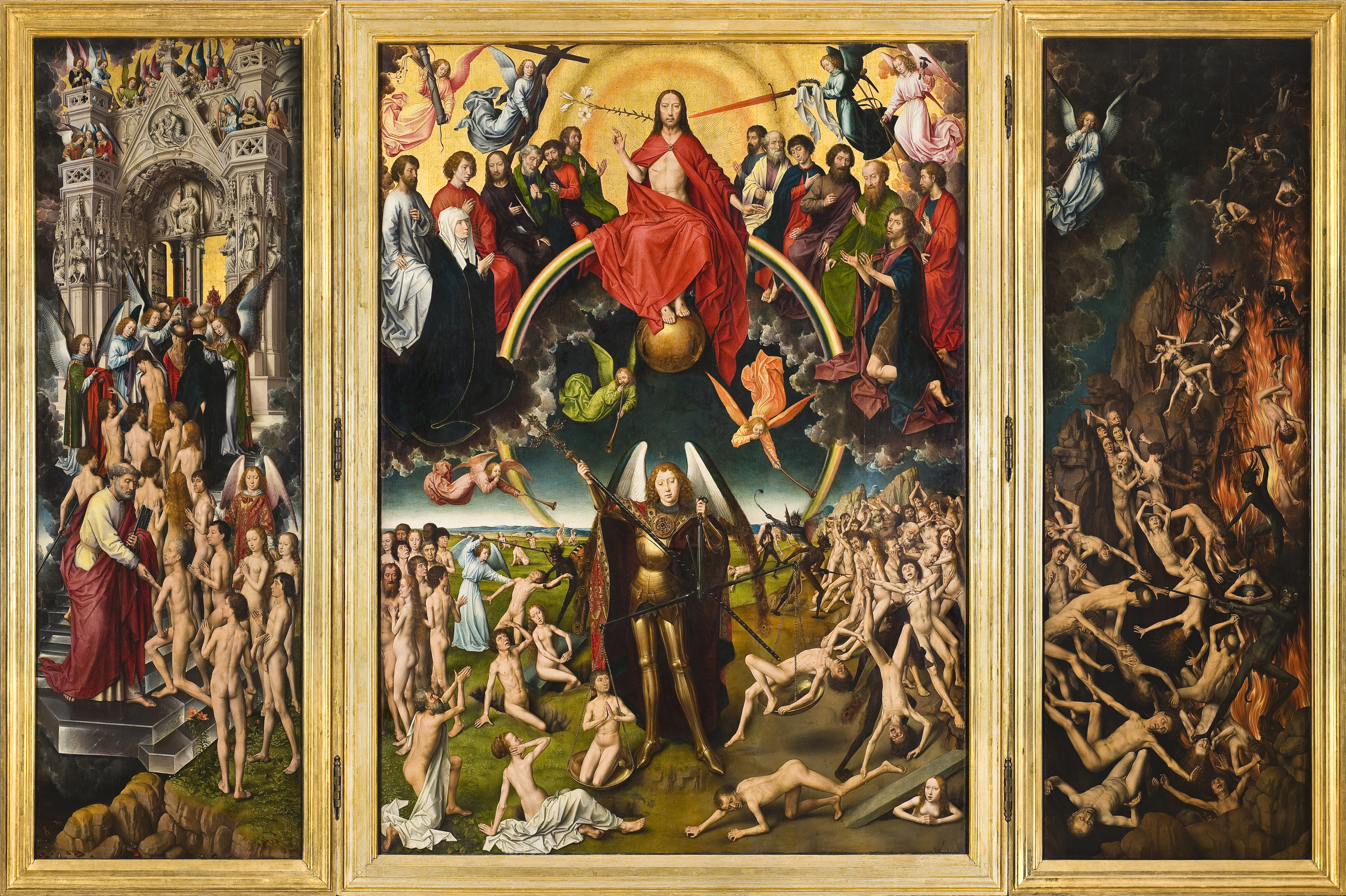
The Last Judgment by painter Hans Memling. In Christian belief, the Last Judgement is an apocalyptic event where God makes a final judgement of all people on Earth.

Predictions of apocalyptic events that will result in the extinction of humanity, a collapse of civilization, or the destruction of the planet have been made since at least the beginning of the Common Era. Most predictions are related to Abrahamic religions, often standing for or similar to the eschatological events described in their scriptures. Christian predictions typically refer to events like the Rapture, Great Tribulation, Last Judgment, and the Second Coming of Christ. End-time events are normally predicted to occur within the lifetime of the person making the prediction and are usually made using the Bible—in particular the New Testament—as either the primary or exclusive source for the predictions. This often takes the form of mathematical calculations, such as trying to calculate the point in time where it will have been 6,000 years since the supposed creation of the Earth by the Abrahamic God, which according to the Talmud marks the deadline for the Messiah to appear. Predictions of the end from natural events have also been theorised by various scientists and scientific groups. While these predictions are generally accepted as plausible within the scientific community, the events and phenomena are not expected to occur for hundreds of thousands, or even billions, of years from now.

Little research has been carried out into the reasons people have made apocalyptic predictions in modern times. Historically, such predictions have been made for the purpose of diverting attention from actual crises like poverty and war, pushing political agendas, or promoting hatred of certain groups; antisemitism was a popular theme of Christian apocalyptic predictions in medieval times, while some French and Lutheran depictions of the apocalypse were known to feature English and Catholic antagonists, respectively. According to psychologists, possible explanations for why people believe in modern apocalyptic predictions include: mentally reducing the actual danger in the world to a single and definable source; an innate human fascination with fear; personality traits of paranoia and powerlessness; and a modern romanticism related to end-times, resulting from its portrayal in contemporary fiction. The prevalence of Abrahamic religions throughout modern history is said to have created a culture that encourages the embracement of a future drastically different from the present. Such a culture is credited for the rise in popularity of predictions that are more secular in nature, such as the 2012 phenomenon, while maintaining the centuries-old theme that a powerful force will bring about the end of humanity.

In 2012, opinion polls conducted across 20 countries found that over 14% of people believe the world will end in their lifetime, with percentages ranging from 6% of people in France to 22% in the United States and Turkey. Belief in the apocalypse is most prevalent in people with lower levels of education, lower household incomes, and those under the age of 35. In the United Kingdom in 2015, 23% of the general public believed the apocalypse was likely to occur in their lifetime, compared to 10% of experts from the Global Challenges Foundation. The general public believed the likeliest cause would be nuclear war, while experts thought it would be artificial intelligence. Only 3% of Britons thought the end would be caused by the Last Judgement, compared with 16% of Americans. Up to 3% of the people surveyed in both the UK and the US thought the apocalypse would be caused by zombies or alien invasion.

== Past predictions ==
=== First millennium CE ===
Date(s) (CE)	Claimant(s)	Description	Ref.
66–70	Simon bar Giora, Jewish Essenes	The Jewish Essene sect of ascetics saw the Jewish uprising against the Romans in 66–70 in Judea as the final end-time battle which would bring about the arrival of the Messiah. By the authority of Simon, coins were minted declaring the redemption of Israel.	
365	Hilary of Poitiers	This French bishop announced that the end of the world would happen during this year.	
375–400	Martin of Tours	This French bishop stated that the world would end before 400 AD, writing, "There is no doubt that the Antichrist has already been born. Firmly established already in his early years, he will, after reaching maturity, achieve supreme power."	
500	Hippolytus of Rome, Sextus Julius Africanus, Irenaeus	All three predicted that Jesus would return in this year, with one of the predictions being based on the dimensions of Noah's Ark.	
6 Apr 793	Beatus of Liébana	This Spanish monk prophesied the Second Coming of Christ and the end of the world on that day in front of a large crowd of people.	
800	Sextus Julius Africanus	This Christian historian revised his prediction from the year 500 to 800.	
799–806	Gregory of Tours	This French bishop calculated that the end would occur between 799 and 806.	
847	Thiota	This Christian declared in 847 that the world would end that year, though later confessed that the prediction was fraudulent and was publicly flogged.	
992–995	Various Christians	Good Friday coincided with the Feast of the Annunciation; this had long been believed to be the event that would bring forth the Antichrist, and thus the end-times, within three years.	
1 Jan 1000	Pope Sylvester II	Various Christian clerics predicted this date as the Millennium, including Pope Sylvester II. As a result, riots are said to have occurred in Europe and pilgrims headed east to Jerusalem. Many historians, however, dispute that any of these events ever took place.	

=== 11th–15th centuries ===
Date(s) (CE)	Claimant(s)	Description	Ref.
1033	Various Christians	Following the failure of the 1 January 1000 prediction, some theorists proposed that the end would occur 1,000 years after Jesus' death, instead of his birth.	
1200–1260	Joachim of Fiore	This Italian mystic determined that the Millennium would begin between 1200 and 1260.	
1284	Pope Innocent III	Pope Innocent III (died 1216) predicted that the world would end 666 years after the rise of Islam.	
1290, 1335	Joachimites	After his 1260 prediction failed, the followers of Joachim of Fiore rescheduled the end of the world to 1290 and then again to 1335.	
1346–1351	Various Europeans	The black plague spreading across Europe was interpreted by many as the sign of the end of times.	
1368–1370	Jean de Roquetaillade	This French alchemist predicted that the Antichrist was to come in 1366 and that the Millennium would begin either in 1368 or 1370.	
1378	Arnaldus de Villa Nova	This Joachite wrote that the Antichrist was to come during this year.	
1492	Various Russian Christians	Many Russian Orthodox Christians beginning from the 1400s believed this year would see Christ's return, since it would be the end of the seventh millennium and the start of the eighth millennium (the year 8000) according to the Byzantine calendar. In 1408, this belief led to the Russian Orthodox Church making the decision not to compute the date of Easter beyond 1491.	

=== 16th century ===
Date(s) (CE)	Claimant(s)	Description	Ref.
1504	Sandro Botticelli	This painter believed he was living during the Tribulation, and that the Millennium would begin in three and a half years from 1500. He wrote into his painting The Mystical Nativity that the Devil was loose and would soon be chained.	
1 Feb 1524	London astrologers	A group of astrologers in London predicted that the world would end by a flood starting in London, based on calculations made the previous June. Twenty thousand Londoners left their homes and headed for higher ground in anticipation.	
20 Feb 1524	Johannes Stöffler	A planetary alignment in Pisces was seen by this astrologer as a sign of the Millennium.	
1524–1526	Thomas Müntzer	1525 would mark the beginning of the Millennium, according to this Anabaptist. His followers were killed by cannon fire in an uneven battle with government troops. He died under torture and was beheaded.	
27 May 1528	Hans Hut	This German Anabaptist predicted that the end would occur on this date.	
1528	Johannes Stöffler	A revised date from Stöffler after his 1524 prediction failed to come true.	
19 Oct 1533	Michael Stifel	This mathematician calculated that Judgement Day would begin at 8:00 am on this day.	
1533	Melchior Hoffman	This Anabaptist prophet predicted Christ's Second Coming to take place this year in Strasbourg. He claimed that 144,000 people would be saved, while the rest of the world would be consumed by fire.	
5 Apr 1534	Jan Matthys	During the Münster rebellion, this Anabaptist leader declared that the apocalypse would take place on this day. When the day came he led a failed attack against Franz von Waldeck and was decapitated.	
1555	Pierre d'Ailly	Around 1400, this French theologian wrote that 6845 years of human history had already passed, and the end of the world would be in the 7000th year.	
1585	Michael Servetus	In his book The Restoration of Christianity, the Spanish born reformer claimed that the Devil's reign in this world had started in 325 AD, at the Council of Nicea, and would last for 1260 years, thus ending in 1585.	
1588	Regiomontanus	This mathematician and astronomer predicted the end of the world during this year.	
1600	Martin Luther	Luther, a German priest and professor of theology, predicted that the end of the world would occur no later than 1600.	

=== 17th century ===
Date(s) (CE)	Claimant(s)	Description	Ref.
1 Feb 1624	London astrologers	The same astrologers who had predicted the deluge of 1 February 1524 recalculated the date to 100 years later after their first prophecy failed.	
1648	Sabbatai Zevi	Using the kabbalah, this rabbi from Turkey proclaimed that the Messiah would come during that year.	
1651	Unknown author from Lübeck, Germany	The apocalypse maps tell of an Antichrist, the rise of Islam and other events following Judgement Day that was predicted to occur in 1651.	
1654	Helisaeus Roeslin	This physician made a prediction that the world would end this year based on a nova that occurred in 1572.	
1656	Christopher Columbus	In his Book of Prophecies (1501), Columbus predicted that the world would end during this year.	
1655–1657	Fifth Monarchists	This group of radical Christians predicted that the final apocalyptic battle and the destruction of the Antichrist were to take place between 1655 and 1657.	
1658	Christopher Columbus	Columbus claimed that the world was created in 5343 BCE and would last 7,000 years. Assuming no year zero, that means the end would come in 1658.	
1660	Joseph Mede	Mede claimed that the Antichrist had appeared in 456, and the end would come in 1660.	
1666	Sabbatai Zevi	Following his failed prediction of 1648, Zevi recalculated the end of the Earth for this year.	
1666	Fifth Monarchists	The presence of 666 in the date, the death of 100,000 Londoners to bubonic plague, and the Great Fire of London led to superstitious fears of the end of the world from some Christians.	
1673	William Aspinwall	This Fifth Monarchist claimed that the Millennium would begin by this year.	
1688	John Napier	This mathematician calculated that the end of the world would be on this year based on calculations from the Book of Revelation.	
1689	Pierre Jurieu	This prophet predicted that Judgement Day would occur this year.	
1694	John Mason	This Anglican priest predicted that the Millennium would begin by this year.	
1694	Johann Heinrich Alsted	This Calvinist minister predicted that the Millennium would begin by this year.	
1694	Johann Jacob Zimmermann	Believed that Jesus would return and that the world would end this year.	
1697	Cotton Mather	This Puritan minister predicted that the world would end this year. After the prediction failed, he revised the date of the end two more times.	

=== 18th century ===
Date(s) (CE)	Claimant(s)	Description	Ref.
1700	John Napier	Following his 1688 prediction, Napier recalculated his end of the world prediction to 1700 in A Plaine Discovery, a book published in 1593.	
1700	Henry Archer	In his 1642 work, The Personall Reigne of Christ Upon Earth, Archer predicted that the Second Coming of Jesus would occur in approximately this year.	
1705–1708	Camisards	Camisard prophets predicted that the end of the world would occur in either 1705, 1706 or 1708.	
1716	Cotton Mather	Revised prediction from Mather after his 1697 prediction failed to come true.	
5 Apr 1719	Jacob Bernoulli	This mathematician predicted that a comet would destroy the Earth on this day.	
1700–1734	Nicholas of Cusa	This medieval cardinal predicted that the end would occur between 1700 and 1734.	
16 Oct 1736	William Whiston	This theologian predicted that a comet colliding with the Earth this year.	
1736	Cotton Mather	Mather's third and final prediction for the end of the world.	
1757	Emanuel Swedenborg	Swedenborg, a Lutheran theologian, claimed that the Last Judgement occurred in the spiritual world this year.	
19 May 1780	Connecticut General Assembly members, New Englanders	The sky turning dark during the day was interpreted as a sign of the end times. The primary cause of the event is believed to have been a combination of smoke from forest fires, a thick fog, and cloud cover.	
1789	Pierre d'Ailly	The year 1789 would bring the coming of the Antichrist, according to this 14th-century cardinal.	
1792, 1794	Shakers	The Shakers, a Christian sect founded in 18th-century England, predicted that the world would end in 1792 and then in 1794.	
19 Nov 1795	Nathaniel Brassey Halhed	While campaigning for Richard Brothers' release, Halhead proclaimed that the world would end on this day.	
1793–1795	Richard Brothers	This retired sailor stated that the Millennium would begin between 1793 and 1795. He was eventually committed to an insane asylum.	

=== 19th century ===
Date(s) (CE)	Claimant(s)	Description	Ref.
1805	Christopher Love	This Presbyterian minister predicted the destruction of the world by earthquake in 1805, followed by an age of everlasting peace when God would be known by all.	
1806	Mary Bateman	In Leeds, England, in 1806 a hen began laying eggs on which the phrase "Christ is coming" was written. Eventually it was discovered to be a hoax. The owner, Mary Bateman, had written on the eggs in a corrosive ink so as to etch the eggs, and reinserted the eggs back into the hen's oviduct.	
19 Oct 1814	Joanna Southcott	This 64-year-old self-described prophet claimed that she was pregnant with the Christ child, and that he would be born on 19 October 1814. She died later that year having not delivered a child, and an autopsy proved that she had not been pregnant.	
Nov 12–13, 1833	Various	During a large Leonids meteor shower, several people including Joseph Smith believed that it was a sign of Jesus' second coming.	
1836	Johann Albrecht Bengel	In the 1730s this Lutheran clergyman proclaimed that Judgment Day would come in 1836, with the pope as the anti-Christ and the Freemasons representing the "false prophet" of Revelations.	
1836	John Wesley	Wesley, the founder of the Methodist Church, foresaw the Millennium beginning this year. He wrote that Revelation 12:14 referred to 1058 to 1836, "when Christ should come".	
28 Apr 1843, 31 Dec 1843	Millerites	Although it was not officially endorsed by their leadership, many Millerites expected the Second Coming to occur on 28 April or at the end of 1843.	
1843	Harriet Livermore	The first of two years this preacher predicted that the world would end.	
21 Mar 1844	William Miller	Miller, a Baptist preacher, predicted that Christ would return on this day.	
22 Oct 1844	Millerites	After Christ did not return on 21 March 1844, the Millerites then revised William Miller's prediction to 22 October the same year, claiming to have miscalculated Scripture. The realization that the predictions were incorrect resulted in the Great Disappointment.	
7 Aug 1847	George Rapp	Rapp, the founder of the Harmony Society, preached that Jesus would return in his lifetime, even as he lay dying on 7 August 1847.	
1847	Harriet Livermore	The second prediction of the end of the world from this preacher.	
1862	John Cumming	This Scottish clergyman stated that it was 6,000 years since creation in 1862, and that the world would end.	
1862	Joseph Morris	An English convert to Mormonism, Morris had revelations to gather his followers and wait for the Second Coming, through successive prophesied days.	
1863	John Wroe	The founder of the Christian Israelite Church calculated that the Millennium would begin this year.	
1873	Jonas Wendell	In 1870, Wendell published his views in the booklet entitled The Present Truth, or Meat in Due Season concluding that the Second Advent was sure to occur in 1873.	
1874	Charles Taze Russell	This Christian minister predicted the return of Jesus to occur in 1874, and after this date reinterpreted the prediction to say that Jesus had indeed returned in invisible form.	
1881	Mother Shipton (attrib.)	This 15th-century prophet was quoted as saying "The world to an end shall come, In eighteen hundred and eighty one" in a book published in 1862. In 1873 it was revealed to be a forgery; however, this did not stop some people from expecting the end.	
1890	Wovoka	The founder of the Ghost Dance movement predicted in 1889 that the Millennium would occur in 1890.	

=== 20th century ===
Date(s) (CE)	Claimant(s)	Description	Ref.
1901	Catholic Apostolic Church	Founded in 1831, this church claimed that Jesus would return by the time the last of its 12 founding members died. The last member died in 1901.	
1901	Annie Keeler	Keeler, a prominent doctor in Connecticut, predicted that due to the alignment of the planets, the world would come to an end and "complete the planetary cycle as it was in the days of Noah".	
1910	Camille Flammarion	Flammarion predicted that the 1910 appearance of Halley's Comet "would impregnate that atmosphere and possibly snuff out all life on the planet" but not the planet itself. "Comet pills" were sold to protect against toxic gases.	
1892–1911	Charles Piazzi Smyth	This pyramidologist concluded from his research on the dimensions of the Great Pyramid of Giza that the Second Coming would occur somewhere between 1892 and 1911.	
1914	Charles Taze Russell	Russell said "...the battle of the great day of God Almighty... The date of the close of that 'battle' is definitely marked in Scripture as October 1914. It is already in progress, its beginning dating from October, 1874."	
1915	John Chilembwe	This Baptist educator and leader of a rebellion in the British protectorate of Nyasaland predicted that the Millennium would begin this year.	
1918	International Bible Students Association	"Christendom shall be cut off and glorification of the Little Flock (The Church) in the Spring of 1918 A. D."	
1920	International Bible Students Association	In 1918, Christendom would go down as a system to oblivion and be succeeded by revolutionary governments. God would "destroy the churches wholesale and the church members by the millions." Church members would "perish by the sword of war, revolution and anarchy." The dead would lie unburied. In 1920 all earthly governments would disappear, with worldwide anarchy prevailing.	
13 Feb 1925	Margaret Rowen	According to this Seventh-Day Adventist, the angel Gabriel appeared before her in a vision and told her that the world would end at midnight on this date.	
1926	Spencer Perceval	This British MP, who was one of the 12 apostles of the Catholic Apostolic Church, believed that the world was growing nearer to the Apocalypse due to what he viewed as the rampant immorality of the times in Europe.	
Sep 1935	Wilbur Glenn Voliva	This evangelist announced that "the world is going to go 'puff' and disappear" in September 1935.	
1936	Herbert W. Armstrong	The founder of the Worldwide Church of God told members of his church that the Rapture was to take place in 1936, and that only they would be saved. After the prophecy failed, he changed the date three more times.	
1941	Jehovah's Witnesses	A prediction of the end from the Jehovah's Witnesses, a group that branched from the Bible Student movement.	
1943	Herbert W. Armstrong	The first of three revised dates from Armstrong after his 1936 prediction failed to come true.	
1947	John Ballou Newbrough	The author of Oahspe: A New Bible foresaw the destruction of all nations and the beginning of post-apocalyptic anarchy in this year.	
21 Dec 1954	Dorothy Martin	The world was to be destroyed by terrible flooding on this date, claimed this leader of a UFO cult called Brotherhood of the Seven Rays. The fallout of the group after the prediction failed was the basis for the 1956 book When Prophecy Fails.	
22 Apr 1959	Florence Houteff	The second prophet of the Branch Davidians predicted that the apocalypse foretold in the Book of Revelation would proceed on this date. The failure of the prophecy led to the split of the sect into several subsects, the most prominent led by Benjamin and Lois Roden.	
4 Feb 1962	Jeane Dixon, various Indian astrologers	Dixon predicted that a planetary alignment on this day was to bring destruction to the world. Mass prayer meetings were held in India.	
20 Aug 1967	George Van Tassel	This day would mark the beginning of the third woe of the Apocalypse, during which the southeastern US would be destroyed by a Soviet nuclear attack, according to this UFO prophet, who claimed to have channeled an alien named Ashtar.	
1967	Jim Jones	The founder of the People's Temple stated that he had visions that a nuclear holocaust was to take place in 1967.	
9 Aug 1969	George Williams	The founder of the Church of the Firstborn predicted that the Second Coming of Christ would occur on this day.	
1969	Charles Manson	Manson predicted that Helter skelter, an apocalyptic race war, would occur in 1969.	
1972	Herbert W. Armstrong	The second of three revised dates from Armstrong after his 1936 and 1943 predictions failed to come true.	
Jan 1974	David Berg	Berg, the leader of Children of God, predicted that there would be a colossal doomsday event heralded by Comet Kohoutek.	
1975	Herbert W. Armstrong	Armstrong's fourth and final prediction.	
1975	Jehovah's Witnesses	From 1966 on, Jehovah's Witnesses published articles stating that the fall of 1975 would be 6,000 years since man's creation and suggested that Armageddon could be finished by then.	
1976	Brahma Kumaris	The Brahma Kumaris founder, Lekhraj Kirpalani, has made a number of predictions of a global Armageddon which the religion believes it will inspire, internally calling it "Destruction". During Destruction, Brahma Kumari leaders teach that the world will be purified, all of the rest of humanity killed by nuclear or civil wars and natural disasters which will include the sinking of all other continents except India.	
1977	John Wroe	The founder of the Christian Israelite Church predicted this year for Armageddon to occur.	
1977	William M. Branham	This Christian minister predicted that the Rapture would occur no later than 1977.	
1980	Leland Jensen	Jensen predicted in 1978 that there would be a nuclear disaster in 1980, followed by two decades of conflict, culminating in God's Kingdom being established on Earth.	
1981	Chuck Smith	The founder of Calvary Chapel predicted that the generation of 1948 would be the last generation and the world would end by 1981. Smith said that he "could be wrong" but added that his prediction was "a deep conviction in my heart, and all my plans are predicated upon that belief."	
10 Mar 1982	John Gribbin, Stephen Plagemann	Gribbin, an astrophysicist, co-authored the 1974 book The Jupiter Effect which predicted that combined gravitational forces of aligned planets would create a number of catastrophes, including a great earthquake on the San Andreas Fault.	
21 Jun 1982	Benjamin Creme	Creme took out an ad in the Los Angeles Times stating that the Second Coming would occur in June 1982, and the Maitreya announced it on worldwide television.	
1982	Pat Robertson	In late 1976, Robertson predicted on his The 700 Club TV programme that the end of the world would come in this year.	
1985	Lester Sumrall	This Pentecostal minister predicted the end of the world in this year, even writing a book about it entitled I Predict 1985.	
29 Apr 1986	Leland Jensen	Jensen predicted that Halley's Comet would be pulled into Earth's orbit on this day, causing widespread destruction.	
17 Aug 1987	José Argüelles	Argüelles claimed that Armageddon would happen unless 144,000 people gathered in certain places across the world in order to "resonate in harmony" on this day.	
11–13 Sep 1988, 3 Oct 1988	Edgar C. Whisenant	Whisenant predicted in his book 88 Reasons Why the Rapture Could Be in 1988 that the Rapture of the Christian Church would occur between 11 and 13 September 1988. After this prediction failed to come true, Whisenant revised his prediction date to 3 October.	
30 Sep 1989	Edgar C. Whisenant	After all his 1988 predictions failed to come true, Whisenant revised his prediction date to this day.	
23 Apr 1990	Elizabeth Clare Prophet	Prophet predicted that a nuclear war would start on this day, and that the world would end 12 years later, leading her followers to stockpile a shelter with supplies and weapons. After Prophet's prediction did not come to pass, she was later diagnosed with epilepsy and Alzheimer's disease.	
9 Sep 1991	Menachem Mendel Schneerson	This Russian-born rabbi called for the Messiah to come by the start of the Jewish New Year.	
1991	Louis Farrakhan	The leader of the Nation of Islam declared that the Gulf War would be the "War of Armageddon which is the final war".	
28 Sep 1992	Rollen Stewart	This born-again Christian predicted that the Rapture would take place on this day.	
28 Oct 1992	Lee Jang Rim (이장림 or 李長林)	Lee, the leader of the Dami Mission church, predicted that the rapture would occur on this day.	
1993	David Berg	Berg predicted that the tribulation would start in 1989 and that the Second Coming would take place in 1993.	
1993	Edgar C. Whisenant	After his 1988 and 1989 predictions failed, Whisenant moved the outer limit of his prediction to 1993.	
1994	Edgar C. Whisenant	When his 1993 prediction failed to materialise, Whisenant updated it to 1994.	
2 May 1994	Neal Chase	This Bahá'í sect leader predicted that New York City would be destroyed by a nuclear bomb on 23 March 1994, and the Battle of Armageddon would take place 40 days later.	
6 Sep 1994, 29 Sep 1994, 2 Oct 1994	Harold Camping	Camping predicted that the Rapture would occur on 6 September 1994. When it failed to occur, he revised the date to 29 September and then 2 October.	
31 Mar 1995	Harold Camping	Camping's fourth predicted date for the end. This would be Camping's last prediction until 2011.	
17 Dec 1996	Sheldan Nidle	Nidle, a Californian psychic, predicted that the world would end on this date, with the arrival of 16 million space ships and a host of angels.	
26 Mar 1997	Marshall Applewhite	Applewhite, leader of the Heaven's Gate cult, claimed that a spacecraft was trailing the Comet Hale-Bopp and argued that suicide was "the only way to evacuate this Earth" so that the cult members' souls could board the supposed craft and be taken to another "level of existence above human". Applewhite and 38 of his followers committed mass suicide.	
23 Oct 1997	James Ussher	This 17th-century Irish archbishop predicted this date to be 6,000 years since creation and therefore the end of the world.	
31 Mar 1998	Hon-Ming Chen	Chen, leader of the Taiwanese cult Chen Tao – "The True Way" – claimed that God would come to Earth in a flying saucer at 10:00 am on this date.	
Jul 1999	Nostradamus	A quatrain by Nostradamus that stated that the "King of Terror" would come from the sky in "1999 and seven months" was frequently interpreted as a prediction of doomsday in July 1999.	
18 Aug 1999	The Amazing Criswell	The predicted date of the end of the world, according to this psychic well known for predictions.	
11 Sep 1999	Philip Berg	Berg, dean of the worldwide Kabbalah Centre, stated that on this date "a ball of fire will descend, destroying almost all of mankind, all vegetation, all forms of life."	
1999	Charles Berlitz	This linguist predicted that the end would occur in this year. He did not predict how it would happen, stating that it might involve nuclear devastation, asteroid impact, pole shift or other Earth changes.	
1999	Hon-Ming Chen	The leader of the cult Chen Tao preached that a nuclear holocaust would destroy Europe and Asia in 1999.	
2000	James Gordon Lindsay	This preacher predicted that the great tribulation would begin before 2000.	
2000	Timothy Dwight IV	This 19th-century president of Yale University foresaw Christ's Millennium starting by 2000.	
2000	Nazim Al-Haqqani	This Sufi Muslim sheikh predicted that the Last Judgment would occur before 2000.	
2000	Peter Olivi	This 13th-century theologian wrote that the Antichrist would come to power between 1300 and 1340, and the Last Judgement would take place around 2000.	
2000	Isaac Newton	Newton predicted that Christ's Millennium would begin in 2000 in his book Observations upon the Prophecies of Daniel, and the Apocalypse of St. John.	
2000	Ruth Montgomery	This self-described Christian psychic predicted that the Earth's axis would shift and the Antichrist would reveal himself in this year.	
2000	Edgar Cayce	This psychic predicted that the Second Coming would occur this year.	
2000	Sun Myung Moon	The founder of the Unification Church predicted that the Kingdom of Heaven would be established in this year.	
2000	Ed Dobson	This pastor predicted that the end would occur in his book The End: Why Jesus Could Return by A.D. 2000.	
2000	Lester Sumrall	This minister predicted the end in his book I Predict 2000.	
2000	Jonathan Edwards	This 18th-century preacher predicted that Christ's thousand-year reign would begin in this year.	
1 Jan 2000	Various	During and before 1999, there were widespread predictions of a computer bug that would crash many computers at midnight on 1 January 2000, causing malfunctions that would lead to major catastrophes worldwide, and that society would cease to function.	
1 Jan 2000	Credonia Mwerinde, Joseph Kibweteere	An estimated 778 followers of the Movement for the Restoration of the Ten Commandments of God perished in a devastating fire and a series of poisonings and killings that were either a group suicide or an orchestrated mass murder by group leaders after their predictions of the apocalypse failed to come about.	
1 Jan 2000	Jerry Falwell	Falwell foresaw God pouring out his judgement on the world on this day.	
1 Jan 2000	Tim LaHaye, Jerry B. Jenkins	These Christian authors claimed that the Y2K bug would trigger global economic chaos, which the Antichrist would use to rise to power. As the date approached, however, they changed their minds.	
6 Apr 2000	James Harmston	The leader of the True and Living Church of Jesus Christ of Saints of the Last Days predicted that the Second Coming of Christ would occur on this day.	
5 May 2000	Nuwaubian Nation	This movement claimed that the planetary lineup would cause a "star holocaust", pulling the planets toward the Sun on this day.	

=== 21st century ===
Date(s) (CE)	Claimant(s)	Description	Ref.
2001	Tynnetta Muhammad	This columnist for the Nation of Islam predicted that the end would occur in this year.	
27 May 2003	Nancy Lieder	Lieder originally predicted the date for the Nibiru collision as May 2003. According to her website, aliens in the Zeta Reticuli star system told her through messages via a brain implant of a planet which would enter the Solar System and cause a pole shift on Earth that would destroy most of humanity.	
30 Oct – 29 Nov 2003	Aum Shinrikyo	This Japanese cult, which carried out the Tokyo subway sarin attack in 1995, predicted that the world would be destroyed by a nuclear war between 30 October and 29 November 2003.	
12 Sep 2006	House of Yahweh	Yisrayl Hawkins, pastor and overseer of The House of Yahweh, predicted in his February 2006 newsletter that a nuclear war would begin on 12 September 2006.	
29 Apr 2007	Pat Robertson	In his 1990 book The New Millennium, Robertson suggests this date as the day of Earth's destruction.	
May 2007	Pyotr Kuznetsov	The founder of the True Russian Orthodox Church predicted that doomsday would occur this month. Kuznetsov and his followers hid in a cave in anticipation of the end, and Kuznetsov attempted suicide after his prediction failed to come true.	
2010	Hermetic Order of the Golden Dawn	This magical organization, which existed from 1887 to 1903, predicted that the world would end during this year.	
21 May 2011	Harold Camping	Camping predicted that the Rapture and devastating earthquakes would occur on this date, with God taking approximately 3% of the world's population into Heaven, and that the end of the world would occur five months later on 21 October.	
29 Sep 2011	Ronald Weinland	Weinland, the founder of the Church of God Preparing for the Kingdom of God, stated that Jesus would return on this day. After his prophecy failed to come true, he changed the date to 27 May 2012.	
21 Oct 2011	Harold Camping	When his original prediction failed to come true five months earlier, Camping revised his prediction by saying that on 21 May a "Spiritual Judgment" had taken place, and both the physical Rapture and the end of the world would occur on 21 October 2011.	
Aug–Oct 2011	Various	There were fears amongst the public that Comet Elenin travelling almost directly between Earth and the Sun would cause disturbances to the Earth's crust, causing massive earthquakes and tidal waves. Others predicted that Elenin would collide with Earth on 16 October. Scientists stated that none of these events were possible in an effort to calm the public.	
27 May 2012	Ronald Weinland	Weinland's revised date for the return of Jesus following the failure of his 2011 prediction.	
30 Jun 2012	José Luis de Jesús	This cult leader predicted that the world's governments and economies would fail on this day, and that he and his followers would undergo a transformation that would allow them to fly and walk through walls.	
21 Dec 2012	Various	The 2012 phenomenon predicted that the world would end at the end of the 13th b'ak'tun. The Earth would be destroyed by an asteroid, Nibiru, or some other interplanetary object; an alien invasion; or a supernova. Mayanist scholars stated that no extant classic Maya accounts forecasted impending doom, and that the idea that the Long Count calendar ends in 2012 misrepresented Maya history and culture. Scientists from NASA, along with expert archeologists, stated that none of those events were possible.	
23 Aug 2013	Grigori Rasputin	Rasputin, a Russian mystic who died in 1916, prophesied that a storm would take place on this day where fire would destroy most life on land and Jesus would come back to Earth to comfort those in distress.	
Apr 2014 – Sep 2015	John Hagee, Mark Biltz	The so-called blood moon prophecy, first predicted by Mark Blitz in 2008 and then by John Hagee in 2014. These Christian ministers claim that the tetrad in 2014 and 2015 may represent the beginning of the Messianic end times.	
7 October 2015	eBible Fellowship	After Harold Camping's 21 May 2011 prediction failed, this group claimed that the world entered a "period of judgement" on that day, and that the true destruction of the world would occur 1,600 days later, on 7 October 2015.	
23 Sep – 15 Oct 2017	David Meade	Conspiracy theorist David Meade predicted that Nibiru would become visible in the sky and would "soon" destroy the Earth.	
23 Apr 2018	David Meade	After his 2017 prediction failed, Meade predicted that the rapture would take place and that the world would end on this date.	
9 Jun 2019	Ronald Weinland	Weinland had previously predicted that the world would end in 2011, and then 2012.	
2020	Jeane Dixon	Dixon predicted that Armageddon would take place in 2020. She had previously predicted that the world would end on 4 February 1962.	
2021	F. Kenton Beshore	This American pastor based his prediction on the prior suggestion that Jesus would return in 1988, i.e., within one biblical generation (40 years) of the founding of Israel in 1948. Beshore argued that the prediction was correct, but that the definition of a biblical generation was incorrect and was actually 70–80 years, placing the second coming of Jesus between 2018 and 2028 and the rapture by 2021 at the latest.	
23 – 24 Sep 2025, 7 – 8 Oct 2025	Joshua Mhlakela and various TikTok users	South African pastor Joshua Mhlakela prophesied the Biblical Rapture where Jesus would ascend true believers to heaven before global tribulation, leading to the hashtag #RaptureTok on TikTok with videos amassing millions of views on tips like survival kits for those "left behind" and historical context of repeated failed predictions. Mhlakela later revised his prediction date based on the Julian calendar after its initial failure.	
13 Nov 2026	Heinz von Foerster, Patricia M. Mora and Lawrence W. Amiot	A mathematical prediction published in the journal Science which extrapolated that historic population growth rates of humanity would lead to an "infinite" number of humans on Earth on approximately this date if those growth rates continued as they had in the past. The mathematical prediction tracked then future human population growth until 1993 before decoupling from actual population growth.	

== Future predictions ==
Date (CE)	Claimant(s)	Description	Ref.
2026	Messiah Foundation International	In accordance with the predictions in Riaz Ahmed Gohar Shahi's book The Religion of God, this spiritual organisation believes that the world will end when an asteroid collides with Earth in 2026.	
2060	Isaac Newton (attrib.)	In an unpublished manuscript, Newton made a reference to the year 2060, which was falsely reported in 2004 as a date for the end of the world. Newton was actually predicting a date before which the world would definitely not end, in order to calm people's fears about the apocalypse.	
2129	Said Nursi	According to this Sunni Muslim theologian, the world will end in 2129.	
2239	Talmud, Orthodox Judaism	According to an opinion about the Talmud in mainstream Orthodox Judaism, the Messiah will come within 6,000 years of the creation of Adam, and the world may be destroyed 1,000 years later. This would put the beginning of the period of desolation in 2239 CE and the end of the period of desolation in 3239 CE.	
2280	Rashad Khalifa	According to this Egyptian-American biochemist's research on the Quran, the world will end in 2280.	
5078	Baba Vanga	This mystic's prophecy places the end of the world in 5078.	

== Scientific far future predictions ==
Estimated timeframe (years)	Claimant(s)	Description	Ref.
300,000	Peter Tuthill	In approximately 300,000 years, WR 104, a triple star, is expected to explode in a supernova. It has been suggested that it may produce a gamma ray burst that could pose a threat to life on Earth should its poles be aligned 12° or lower towards Earth. However, spectroscopic observations now strongly suggest that it is tilted at an angle of 30°-40° and so any gamma ray burst should not hit Earth.	
< 500,000	Nick Bostrom	According to a journal article by Bostrom, an asteroid impacting with Earth would need to be larger than 1 km in diameter to render humans extinct. It is estimated that such an asteroid hits Earth about every 500,000 years.	
< 1 million	The Geological Society	Within the next 1 million years, Earth will likely have undergone a supervolcanic eruption large enough to erupt 3,200 km^{3} of magma, an event comparable to the Toba supereruption 75,000 years ago.	
16 million	Various	A hypothetical dark companion star, Nemesis, with an eccentric orbit of about 27 million years, triggers periodic mass extinctions by perturbing objects beyond Neptune into hitting the Earth. The K–Pg extinction which killed dinosaurs 66 million years ago is used as an anchor point in time for the cycle. Arguments against say it is a statistical artifact and sky surveys have failed to find it.	
< 100 million	Stephen A. Nelson	It is estimated that every 100 million years, Earth will be hit by an asteroid about 10–15 km in diameter, comparable in size to the one that triggered the K–Pg extinction which killed dinosaurs 66 million years ago.	
500–600 million	Anne Minard	By this time it is estimated that a gamma ray burst, or massive, hyperenergetic supernova, would have occurred within 6,500 light-years of Earth; close enough for its rays to affect Earth's ozone layer and potentially trigger a mass extinction, assuming the hypothesis is correct that a previous such explosion triggered the Ordovician–Silurian extinction event. However, the supernova would have to be precisely oriented relative to Earth to have any negative effect.	
600–800 million	Various	By this time the level of carbon dioxide in the atmosphere will have dropped below the level required for C3 carbon fixation in plants. The resulting lack of oxygen-producing plants will cause free oxygen in the atmosphere to disappear, making aerobic life impossible.	
1–5 billion	Various	The estimated end of the Sun's current phase of development, after which it will swell into a red giant, either scorching or swallowing Earth, will occur around five billion years from now. However, as the Sun grows gradually hotter (over millions of years), Earth may become too hot for life as early as one billion years from now.	
1.3 billion	Various	It is estimated that all eukaryotic life will die due to carbon dioxide starvation. Only prokaryotes will remain.	
5 billion	Various	Scientists have suggested that Earth and the Moon would likely be engulfed by the Sun, just before it reaches the largest of its red giant phase when it will be 256 times larger than it is now. A 2026 study suggested that Earth is likely to survive engulfment as it would have gradually moved further out from the Sun by this time.	
22 billion	Various	The end of the Universe in the Big Rip scenario, assuming a model of dark energy with w = −1.5. Observations of galaxy cluster speeds by the Chandra X-ray Observatory suggest that the true value of w is ~-0.991, meaning the Big Rip will not occur.	
10¹⁰⁰	Various	The heat death of the universe is a scientific theory in which the universe will diminish to a state of no thermodynamic free energy and therefore will no longer be able to sustain directed motion or life.	

== See also ==
- Apocalypticism
- Extinction risk from climate change
- List of topics characterized as pseudoscience
- Predictions and claims for the Second Coming
- Unfulfilled Christian religious predictions
