= Predictions and claims for the Second Coming =

Specific dates predicted for the Second Coming

The Second Coming is a Christian and Islamic concept regarding the return of Jesus to Earth after his first coming and his ascension to heaven about two thousand years ago. The belief is based on messianic prophecies found in the canonical gospels and is part of most Christian eschatologies. Views about the nature of Jesus's Second Coming vary among Christian denominations and among individual Christians.

A number of specific dates have been predicted for the Second Coming. This list shows the dates and details of predictions from notable groups or individuals of when Jesus was, or is, expected to return. This list also contains dates specifically predicting Jesus's Millennium, although there are several theories on when the Millennium is believed to occur in relation to the Second Coming.

== Past predictions ==
Predicted date	Claimant	Description
500	Hippolytus of Rome, Sextus Julius Africanus, Irenaeus	These three Christian theologians predicted Jesus would return in the year 500. One prediction was based on the dimensions of Noah's Ark. In Hippolytus's Commentary on Daniel, he writes that six thousand years must pass, since the creation of the world, and he believes it was created 5500 years before Christ.
1260	Joachim of Fiore	The Italian mystic determined that the Millennium would begin between 1200 and 1260.
1368/1370	Jean de Roquetaillade	The Antichrist was predicted to come in 1366 and the Millennium would begin in 1368 or 1370.
1492	Various Russians	Many Russian Orthodox Christians beginning from the start of the 15th century believed this year would mark the end of the world (and by extension, the Second Coming) since it would be the end of the seventh millennium and the start of the eighth millennium according to the Byzantine calendar. In 1408, this belief led to the Russian Orthodox Church making the decision not to compute the date of Easter beyond 1491.
1504	Sandro Botticelli	Believed he was living during the time of the Tribulation, and that the Millennium would begin in three and a half years from 1500.
20 February 1524	Johannes Stöffler	A planetary alignment in Pisces was seen by this astrologer as a sign of the Millennium.
1524–1526	Thomas Müntzer	1525 would mark the beginning of the Millennium, according to this Anabaptist.
19 October 1533	Michael Stifel	This mathematician calculated that the Judgement Day would begin at 8:00 am on this day.
1673	William Aspinwall	This Fifth Monarchist claimed the Millennium would begin by this year.
1694	Johann Jacob Zimmermann	Believed that Jesus would return and the world would end this year.
1694	John Mason and Johann Heinrich Alsted	Both claimed the Millennium would begin by this year.
1700	Henry Archer	Archer counted 1335 years from the end of the reign of Julian the Apostate (the dates of whose reign he was uncertain), taking the 1335 days in Daniel 12:12 as years.
1757	Emanuel Swedenborg	In 1758 Swedenborg reported that the Last Judgment had taken place in the spiritual world in 1757, the year before his report (so he presented this not as a prediction but as an eyewitness account). This was one of many events recounted in his works resulting from visions of Jesus Christ returned. He tells of almost daily interaction with Christ over the course of almost 30 years. His return is not in the flesh, but in His Holy Spirit. "Neither shall they say see here or see there, for behold, the kingdom of God is within you" (Luke 17:20).
1770	Emanuel Swedenborg	On 19 June 1770, Swedenborg reported that upon completion of the theological work "True Christian Religion", that the Lord had completed his Second Coming by means of a man. Not returning again in the flesh, but instead as the Spirit of Truth.
1770	Ann Lee	In the late 1700s, the United Society of Believers in Christ's Second Appearing also known as the Shakers, believed that the second coming of Christ would be through a woman. In 1770, Ann Lee became the leader of the Shakers and they believed she was revealed in "manifestation of Divine light" to be the second coming of Christ and was called Mother Ann.
1793–1795	Richard Brothers	This retired sailor stated the Millennium would begin between 1793 and 1795. He was eventually committed to an insane asylum.
25 December 1814	Joanna Southcott	This 64-year-old self-described prophet claimed she was pregnant with the Christ child, and that he would be born on Christmas Day, 1814. She died on the day of her prediction, and an autopsy proved that she was not pregnant.
15 September 1829	George Rapp	Founder and leader of the Harmony Society, predicted that on 15 September 1829, the three and one half years of the Sun Woman would end and Christ would begin his reign on Earth. Dissension grew when Rapp's predictions went unfulfilled. In March 1832, a third of the group left and some began following Bernhard Müller who claimed to be the Lion of Judah. Nevertheless, most of the group stayed and Rapp continued to lead them until he died on 7 August 1847. His last words to his followers were, "If I did not so fully believe, that the Lord has designated me to place our society before His presence in the land of Canaan, I would consider this my last."
1836	John Wesley	Wesley, the founder of the Methodist Church, foresaw the Millennium beginning this year. He wrote that Revelation 12:14 referred to the years 1058–1836, "when Christ should come".
22 October 1844	William Miller, Millerites	The fact that this failed to happen the way people were expecting was later referred to as the Great Disappointment. Some Millerites continued to set dates; others founded the Seventh-day Adventist Church and the Advent Christian Church, which continue to expect a soon Second Coming but no longer set dates for it. Followers of the Baháʼí Faith claim that Miller's prediction of the year 1844 was in fact calculated correctly, and refers to the advent of the Báb.
7 August 1847	George Rapp	Rapp, the founder of the Harmony Society, preached that Jesus would return in his lifetime, even as he lay dying on 7 August 1847.
1861	Joseph Morris	Morris told his followers not to plant crops because he firmly believed that "Christ will come tomorrow."
1863	John Wroe	The founder of the Christian Israelite Church calculated that the Millennium would begin this year.
1874	Charles Taze Russell	The first president of what is now the Watchtower Society of the Jehovah's Witnesses, calculated 1874 to be the year of Christ's Second Coming, and until his death taught that Christ was invisibly present, and ruling from the heavens from that date prophesied. Russell proclaimed Christ's invisible return in 1874, the resurrection of the saints in 1875, and predicted the end of the "harvest" and a rapture of the saints to heaven for 1878, and the final end of "the day of wrath" in 1914. 1874 was considered the end of 6,000 years of human history and the beginning of judgment by Christ.
1890	Wovoka	The founder of the Ghost Dance movement predicted in 1889 that the Millennium would occur in 1890.
1891	Joseph Smith, Church of Jesus Christ of Latter-day Saints	The minutes of a meeting held on 14 February 1835 (in which the first twelve apostles of the Church of Jesus Christ of Latter-day Saints were chosen, ordained, and instructed) state that "President Smith then stated that the meeting had been called, because God had commanded it; and it was made known to him by vision and by the Holy Spirit. He then gave a relation of some of the circumstances attending us while journeying to Zion—our trials, sufferings; and said God had not designed all this for nothing, but He had it in remembrance yet; and it was the will of God that those who went to zion, with a determination to lay down their lives, if necessary, should be ordained to the ministry, and go forth to prune the vineyard for the last time, or the coming of the Lord, which was nigh—even fifty-six years should wind up the scene" ("History of the Church Volume 2", page 182). However, in a revelation dated 2 April 1843, and published as scripture in Doctrine and Covenants 130:14–17, Smith states: "I was once praying very earnestly to know the time of the coming of the Son of Man, when I heard a voice repeat the following: Joseph, my son, if thou livest until thou art eighty-five years old, thou shalt see the face of the Son of Man; therefore let this suffice, and trouble me no more on this matter. I was left thus, without being able to decide whether this coming referred to the beginning of the millennium or to some previous appearing, or whether I should die and thus see his face. I believe the coming of the Son of Man will not be any sooner than that time". Smith was born December, 1805, which would put that date at no earlier than 1890. Furthermore, in a revelation dated 7 May 1831, Smith records: "Thus saith the Lord; for I am God, and have sent mine Only Begotten Son into the world for the redemption of the world, and have decreed that he that receiveth him shall be saved, and he that receiveth him not shall be damned—And they have done unto the Son of Man even as they listed; and he has taken his power on the right hand of his glory, and now reigneth in the heavens, and will reign till he descends on the earth to put all enemies under his feet, which time is nigh at hand—I, the Lord God, have spoken it; but the hour and the day no man knoweth, neither the angels in heaven, nor shall they know until he comes" (Doctrine and Covenants 49:5–7). According to FAIR, a Mormon apologetics organization, Smith believed no one knew when the Second Coming would be.
1901	Catholic Apostolic Church	This church, founded in 1831, claimed that Jesus would return by the time the last of its 12 founding members died. The last member died in 1901.
1914	Jehovah's Witnesses	The "Second Coming" is important in the doctrine of Jehovah's Witnesses, although they do not use this term. Jehovah's Witnesses believe that Christ's visible (to humans) return will be at Armageddon. They believe that 1914 marked the beginning of Christ's invisible presence (Matt. 24:3 gr. parousia) as the King of God's Kingdom (Psalm 110; Revelation 12:10), and the beginning of the last days of the human ruled system of society. They believe the signs Christ revealed about his return in Matthew 24, Mark 13, and Luke 21 began to occur starting in 1914. In a parallel biblical account at Revelation 6, they believe the ride of the symbolic four horsemen began in the same year, and that the first rider on the white horse depicts the Christ. He goes forth to complete his conquest of the earth, while the rule by human leaders continues for a short while until they meet their end at Armageddon by the power of the Christ (Revelation 19:11–21).
1915	John Chilembwe	This Baptist educator and leader of a rebellion in Nyasaland predicted the Millennium would begin this year.
1917–1930	Sun Myung Moon	The followers of Reverend Sun Myung Moon consider Reverend Moon to be the Lord of the Second Advent called by Jesus Christ on Easter Sunday at the age of 15 on a Korean mountainside (see Divine Principle).
1930–1939	Rudolf Steiner	Steiner described the physical incarnation of Christ as a unique event, but predicted that Christ would reappear in the etheric, or lowest spiritual, plane beginning in the 1930s. This would manifest in various ways: as a new spiritual approach to community life and between individuals; in more and more individuals discovering fully conscious access to the etheric plane (clairvoyance); and in Christ's appearance to groups of seekers gathered together.
1935, 1943, 1972 and 1975	Herbert W. Armstrong	Armstrong, Pastor-General and self-proclaimed "Apostle" of the Radio Church of God, and then the Worldwide Church of God, felt the return of Jesus Christ might be in 1975. Of particular note was the book 1975 in Prophecy! written by Armstrong and published by the Radio Church of God in 1956. Though, never explicitly stating a date in the booklet, the title led people to believe the date was the second coming. It was actively preached in sermons in the 1960s by all of his ministers that his church would "flee" to Petra, Jordan in 1972 and Christ would return 3 1/2 years later. After the failure to flee in 1972 (and a defection of his ministry) Armstrong was careful not to set specific dates but claimed that Christ would return before he died. He died 16 January 1986. Armstrong had previously predicted in a 1934 edition of The Plain Truth magazine that Christ would return in 1936. After that prediction failed, he stated in a 1940 edition of The Plain Truth that "Christ will come after 3 1/2 years of tribulation in October 43." After those failed predictions and loss of members he moved his operation from Oregon to Pasadena, California. After Armstrong's death in 1986, his Worldwide Church of God and the empire he created slowly disintegrated, abandoning his beliefs and philosophies and eventually the name. His three college campuses and the majority of his Pasadena headquarter properties were closed and sold. His successors changed the name to Grace Communion International in 2009.
October 1964	Movement within Seventh-day Adventistm	Since the 1950s there was a movement within the Seventh-day Adventist Church that quoted the Bible where it says: "As it was in the days of Noah, so will it be when the Son of Man comes" Matthew 24:37 and it was suggested that if the end-time was as long as the days of Noah (who preached for 120 years Genesis 6:3) Christ would come around October 1964, 120 years after the Great Disappointment of 1844.
21 June 1982	Benjamin Creme	The followers of the New Age Theosophical guru Benjamin Crème, like Alice A. Bailey, believe the Second Coming will occur when Maitreya (the being Theosophists identify as being Christ) makes his presence on Earth publicly known—Crème believes Maitreya has been on Earth since 1977, living in secret. Crème put advertisements in many of the world's major newspapers in early 1982 stating that the Second Coming would occur on Monday, 21 June 1982 (summer solstice in the Northern Hemisphere), at which time Christ (Maitreya) would announce his Second Coming on worldwide television (this is called the Emergence or Day of Declaration; this is when, Crème's followers believe, the Maitreya will telepathically overshadow all of humanity when he appears on worldwide television) When this event did not occur, Crème claimed that the "world is not yet ready to receive Maitreya"; his followers continue to believe it will happen "soon".
1988	Hal Lindsey	Published a book, The Late Great Planet Earth, suggesting Christ would return in the 1980s, probably no later than 1988.
1988	Edgar C. Whisenant	Published a book, 88 Reasons Why The Rapture Will Be in 1988, predicting the Second Coming and World War III, starting on Rosh Hashanah that year.
1989	Edgar C. Whisenant	In 1989, Whisenant published The Final Shout: Rapture Report 1989, updating his prediction to 1989.
1993	Edgar C. Whisenant	When his 1989 prediction failed, Whisenant predicted the Second Coming in 1993, publishing 23 Reasons Why a Pre-Tribulation Rapture Looks Like it will Occur on Rosh-Hashanah 1993.
6 September 1994	Harold Camping	Camping, general manager of Family Radio and Bible teacher, published a book, 1994?, a prediction that Christ's return was likely pointing to 1994.
1999–2009	Jerry Falwell	Fundamentalist preacher who predicted in 1999 that the Second Coming would probably be within 10 years.
2000	Frank Cherry	Founder of the Black Hebrew Israelite religion, who predicted the end would occur in A.D. 2000.
2000	Ed Dobson	This pastor predicted the end would occur in his book The End: Why Jesus Could Return by A.D. 2000.
2000	Timothy Dwight IV	This President of Yale University foresaw Christ's Millennium starting by 2000.
2000	Edgar Cayce	This psychic predicted the Second Coming would occur this year.
6 April 2000	James Harmston	The leader of the True and Living Church of Jesus Christ of Saints of the Last Days predicted the Second Coming of Christ would occur on this day.
21 May 2011; 21 October 2011	Harold Camping	See: 2011 end times prediction. Camping claimed that the rapture would be on 21 May 2011 followed by the end of the world on 21 October of the same year. Camping wrote "Adam when?" and claimed the biblical calendar meshes with the secular and is accurate from 11,013 BC–AD 2011.
29 September 2011; 27 May 2012; 18 May 2013	Ronald Weinland	Weinland predicted Jesus would return on 29 September 2011. When his prediction failed to come true, he moved the date of Jesus's return to 27 May 2012. When that prediction failed, he then moved the date to 18 May 2013, claiming that "a day with God is as a year," giving himself another year for his prophecy to take place. Weinland was convicted of tax evasion in 2012 and sentenced to 3 1/2 years in federal prison.
2012	Jack Van Impe	Televangelist who has, over the years, predicted many specific years and dates for the Second Coming of Jesus, but has continued to move his prediction later. When many of these dates had already passed, he pointed to 2012 as a possible date for the second coming. After 2012, Van Impe no longer claimed to know the exact date of the Second Coming, but quoted verses which imply that mankind should know when the Second Coming is near.
28 September 2015	Mark Biltz	Starting in 2008, Mark Biltz began teaching that Christ's return would correspond with the 28 September 2015 lunar eclipse. His idea, known as the Blood Moon Prophecy, attracted attention from pastor John Hagee (who stopped short of claiming Christ would return on that precise date) and mainstream media such as USA Today.
9 June 2019	Ronald Weinland	Weinland believed that Jesus Christ would return on Pentecost in 2019.
2020	Jeane Dixon	The alleged psychic claimed that Armageddon would take place in 2020 and Jesus would return to defeat the unholy Trinity of the Antichrist, Satan and the False prophet between 2020 and 2037.
22 July 2020	Chad and Lori Daybell	Chad and Lori Daybell, a couple charged with multiple murders, including those of Lori's children Tylee Ryan and J. J. Vallow, believed that the second coming would be on 22 July 2020.
2021	F. Kenton "Doc" Beshore	Beshore based his prediction on the prior suggestion that Jesus could return in 1988, i.e., within one biblical generation (40 years) of the founding of Israel in 1948. Beshore argued that the prediction was correct, but that the definition of a biblical generation was incorrect and was actually 70–80 years, placing the Second Coming of Jesus between 2018 and 2028 and the Rapture by 2021 at the latest.
23–24 September 2025, 7–8 October 2025	Joshua Mhlakela	Mhlakela, a South African preacher, claimed in a YouTube video from June 2025 that the rapture would occur on September 23 or 24. This prediction gained notoriety, especially on TikTok, but it was also met with ridicule. Following September 24, Mhlakela claimed that he mistakenly used the more common Gregorian calendar, rather than Julian calendar. Mhlakela argued that, since Jesus was born in the time of the Julian calendar, the Gregorian calendar dates had to be converted to the Julian calendar. Mhlakela then asserted that the revised dates of 7 and 8 October were the correct dates for the rapture, which correspond to the original 23 and 24 September.

== Future predictions ==
Predicted date	Claimant	Notes
After 2025	Alice A. Bailey	In January 1946, the New Age Theosophical guru prophesied that Christ would return "sometime after AD 2025" (Theosophists identify "Christ" as being identical to a being they call Maitreya) to inaugurate the Age of Aquarius; thus, this event will be, according to Bailey, the New Age equivalent of the Christian concept of the Second Coming. Bailey stated that Saint Germain is the manager of the executive council of the Christ (Like C.W. Leadbeater, Bailey refers to Saint Germain as the Master Rakoczi or the Master R. in her books); thus, according to Bailey, Saint Germain's primary task is to prepare the way for the Second Coming.
September 20-22, 2028	Kent Hovind	In 2013, Hovind self-published a dissertation which was written whilst in prison, for a Doctor of Ministry degree from the Patriot Bible University. In response to "When is The Lord Coming Back?," Hovind wrote: "During the feast of Trumpets in 2028." This is the same date as Rosh Hashanah, which is September 20-22 in 2028.
2029	Jakob Lorber	Austrian Christian mystic who wrote during 24 years a vast number of works later called the New Revelation, claimed to be received through an inner voice which belonged to Jesus Christ, offered many detailed prophecies concerning the unfolding of the Second Coming, pointing to a time before the passing of 2,000 years after the death of Christ on the cross (note that most scholars assume a date of birth of Jesus between 6 BC and 4 BC).
By 2057	Frank J. Tipler	In 1994, the physicist published a book called The Physics of Immortality, in which he claimed to scientifically prove the existence of God as a consequence of what he calls the Omega Point Theory. In 2007, he published a sequel to The Physics of Immortality called The Physics of Christianity, which applies the principles of the Omega Point Theory to the Christian religion. In this 2007 book, he asserts in the first chapter that the Second Coming of Christ will occur within 50 years, i.e., by 2057, and will be coincident with what futurist Ray Kurzweil calls the Singularity (which Kurzweil himself predicts will occur by 2045).
2060	Isaac Newton	Newton had an interest in Biblical prophecy. He believed that the number "1260" had particular significance in the prophetic books of the Bible. He viewed the merger of the Pope's religious authority with political authority as the Great Apostasy. After considering several possible starting dates, he settled on 800 AD—the year when Charlemagne and Pope Leo III established a power-sharing agreement that created the Holy Roman Empire. Newton believed it would come to an end with the Apocalypse after 1260 years i.e. in the year 2060 AD.

== See also ==
- Christian eschatology
- Eschatology
- Historicist interpretations of the Book of Revelation
- Legends surrounding the papacy
- List of people claimed to be Jesus
- List of dates predicted for apocalyptic events
- Prophecy of the Popes
- Religious views of Isaac Newton
- Unfulfilled Christian religious predictions
