= Whisenant =

Whisenant is a surname. Notable people with the surname include:

- Edgar C. Whisenant (1932–2001), American engineer and Bible student
- John Whisenant (born 1945), American basketball coach
- Matt Whisenant (born 1971), American baseball player
- Pete Whisenant (1929–1996), American baseball player and coach

== See also ==
- Thomas Whisenhant, (1947–2010), American serial killer
