= True Church =

A number of Christian groups have called themselves the "True Church":

- True Jesus Church
- True Church of Jesus Christ of Latter Day Saints
- True Church of Jesus Christ (Cutlerite)
- True Orthodox Church
- True Russian Orthodox Church

== See also ==
- One true church
- Marks of the Church (Protestantism)
