= Russian True Orthodox Church =

Russian True Orthodox Church may refer to:

- Catacomb Church
- True Russian Orthodox Church
- Russian True Orthodox Church (Lazar Zhurbenko)
