= Johannes Kelpius =

German-American mystic (1667–1708)

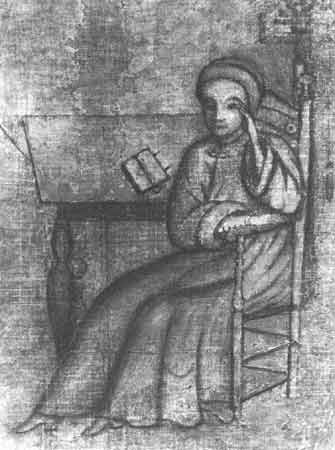
- Born: January 1, 1667; Schäßburg, Principality of Transylvania
- Died: January 1, 1708 (aged 41); Germantown, Pennsylvania, British America
- Resting place: Unknown in Pennsylvania

Signature
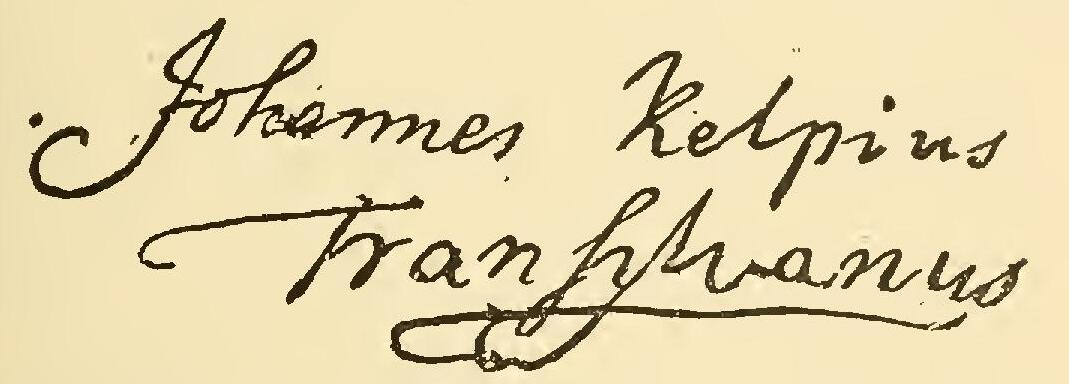

Johannes Kelpius (German pronunciation: [ˈjo:hanəs ˈkɛlpi:ʊs]; 1667 – 1708) was a German Pietist, mystic, musician, and writer. He was also interested in the occult, botany, and astronomy. He came to believe with his followers – called the "Society of the Woman in the Wilderness" – that the end of the world would occur in 1694. This belief, based on an elaborate interpretation of Revelation 12:6, anticipated the advent of a heavenly kingdom somewhere in the wilderness during that year. Kelpius felt that the seventeenth-century Province of Pennsylvania, given its reputation for religious toleration at the edge of a barely settled wilderness, was the best place to be. Philadelphia had been founded in 1682, but the city and the Province of Pennsylvania had quickly become a tolerant haven and refuge for many pietist, communitarian, or free-thinking groups who were leaving the Old World for the congenial religious climate of the British colony. Kelpius and his followers crossed the Atlantic and lived in the valley of the Wissahickon Creek in Philadelphia from 1694 until his death. It was reported by Juhász in 2006 that they lived communally, though they also spent time in solitary meditation in caves and small cells scattered about their common living quarters. Though no sign or revelation accompanied the year 1694, the faithful, known as the Hermits or Mystics of the Wissahickon, continued to live in celibacy, searching the stars and hoping for the end.

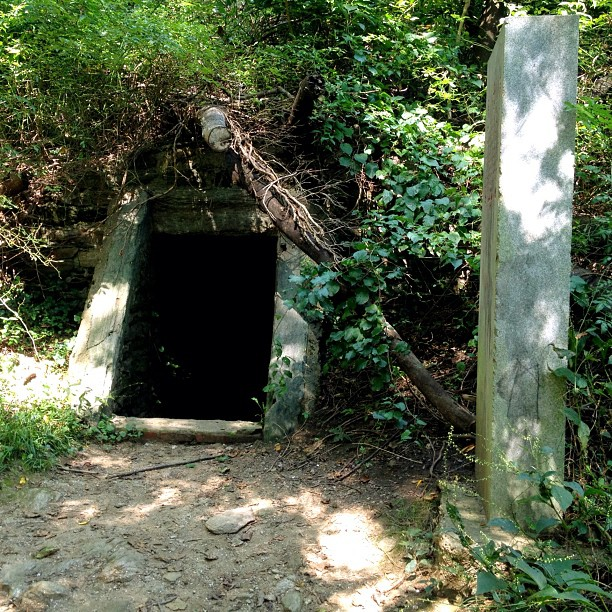
Cave of Kelpius located near Wissahickon Creek

The so-called Cave of Kelpius is located by a small tributary stream of the Wissahickon in Philadelphia's present-day 1,372-acre (5.55 km^{2}) Wissahickon Valley Park.

== Life ==
Kelpius was born Johann Kelp in 1667, (Note: American documents incorrectly placed his birth in 1673) near the town of Schäßburg, Transylvania (modern–day Sighişoara, Romania) and attended the University of Altdorf, near Nuremberg, where his name was Latinized to Johannes Kelpius according to the custom of scholars of his days. By the age of 22 he had taken a master's degree in theology and published several works, including one in collaboration with Johannes Fabricius. At the university he had been drawn to Pietism, initially a reaction against the formalism of orthodox Lutheranism, but a term that sometimes included various esoteric or heretical Christian ideas. He became a follower of Johann Jacob Zimmermann, a mathematician, astronomer, and cleric, whose pastoral position had ended in 1685 due to his prediction of the imminent advent of a heavenly kingdom, as well as his criticism of the state church. Zimmermann was himself attached to the ideas of the mystic Jakob Böhme. After Zimmerman's sudden death, shortly before the group's departure for the New World, Kelpius became the group's magister or leader.

The travel diary of Kelpius has been preserved. Some of the forty or so who traveled with him aboard the Sarah Maria Hopewell were Heinrich Bernhard Koster, Daniel Falckner, and Johann Gottfried Seelig. They disembarked at Bohemia Landing, Maryland, and proceeded to Philadelphia and Germantown. On arrival in Philadelphia (which barely had 500 houses at this time) they moved to Germantown and then to the Wissahickon. There they established a regular program of private study and meditation. They eventually erected a large building for their meetings; some say they lived there communally, but others that they lived separately in caves and other rude shelters and cabins. They created a school for neighborhood children, held public worship services, and shared their medical knowledge. A few newcomers, including Conrad Matthai and Christopher Witt joined the group, but the community began to decline, especially after the death of Kelpius.

Little is known of his death except for an account from years later which states that Kelpius had believed that he would not suffer physical death, but be translated to another existence. The same account suggests that Kelpius possessed the legendary philosopher's stone, which at his direction was cast into the Wissahickon or Schuylkill River shortly before he died near Germantown in 1708.

His literary legacy is a collection of original hymns, a journal that includes many of his correspondences, and a book on prayer and meditation, A Short, Easy, and Comprehensive Method of Prayer, first published in English in 1761, and republished in 1951. A modern translation has been completed by Kirby Don Richards, A Method of Prayer. A Mystical Pamphlet from Colonial America. Richards' book includes both the German original and the new English translation. It also contains background materials that help explain the pamphlet and put it in its historical context.

Kelpius was the subject of one of the first oil portraits in the thirteen British colonies; the painting was by Christopher Witt and was housed in the Historical Society of Pennsylvania, also home to Kelpius's journal, two collections of his original hymns, and other research source material. It's said to have been moved to the State Museum of PA located in Harrisburg.

== Music ==
Kelpius was a musician, and he and his followers took with them instruments that became an integral part of church life. Kelpius was also a composer, and is sometimes called the first Pennsylvanian composer, based on his unproven authorship of several hymns in The Lamenting Voice of the Hidden Love. The 70-page hymnbook which he is believed to have composed is the earliest extant musical manuscript compiled in the thirteen British colonies. It is likely that he wrote the text, though the tunes are mostly based on German songs; four come from Christian Knorr von Rosenroth's Neuer Helicon (Nuremberg, 1684), and another four are from other German sources dated 1690 and later. The harmonies show considerable musical talent and skill. The English translations in the collection are attributed to his disciple Christopher Witt, an Englishman who joined the mystics. Witt is said also to have built them a pipe organ, said to be the first privately owned organ in North America.

== Literary references ==
Kelpius has featured in a few scattered references in American literature. George Lippard calls Kelpius's followers "the monks of the Wissahikon" in his 1847 novel The Rose of Wissahikon. John Greenleaf Whittier borrowed from one of Lippard's short romances to include Kelpius in his 1872 poem Pennsylvania Pilgrim:

Or painful Kelpius from his hermit den
By Wissahickon, maddest of good men,
Dreamed o'er the Chiliast dreams of Petersen.

Deep in the woods, where the small river slid
Snake-like in shade, the Helmstadt Mystic hid,
Weird as a wizard, over arts forbid,

Reading the books of Daniel and of John,
And Behmen's Morning-Redness, through the Stone
Of Wisdom, vouchsafed to his eyes alone,

Whereby he read what man ne'er read before,
And saw the visions man shall see no more,
Till the great angel, striding sea and shore,

Shall bid all flesh await, on land or ships,
The warning trump of the Apocalypse,
Shattering the heavens before the dread eclipse.

The novel Woman in the Wilderness by Jonathan D. Scott has a quite different tone. Scott imagines Kelpius shortly before his death offering this advice to a fellow seeker of wisdom: "... how precious are friendships and how difficult are goodbyes! ... grow into a full life of joy as well as wisdom. ... I beg you not to defer your life in expectation of some promised tomorrow, for our gift is the present."
