= Conversion of the Jews (future event) =

Christian prophecy of a mass conversion of Jews to Christianity

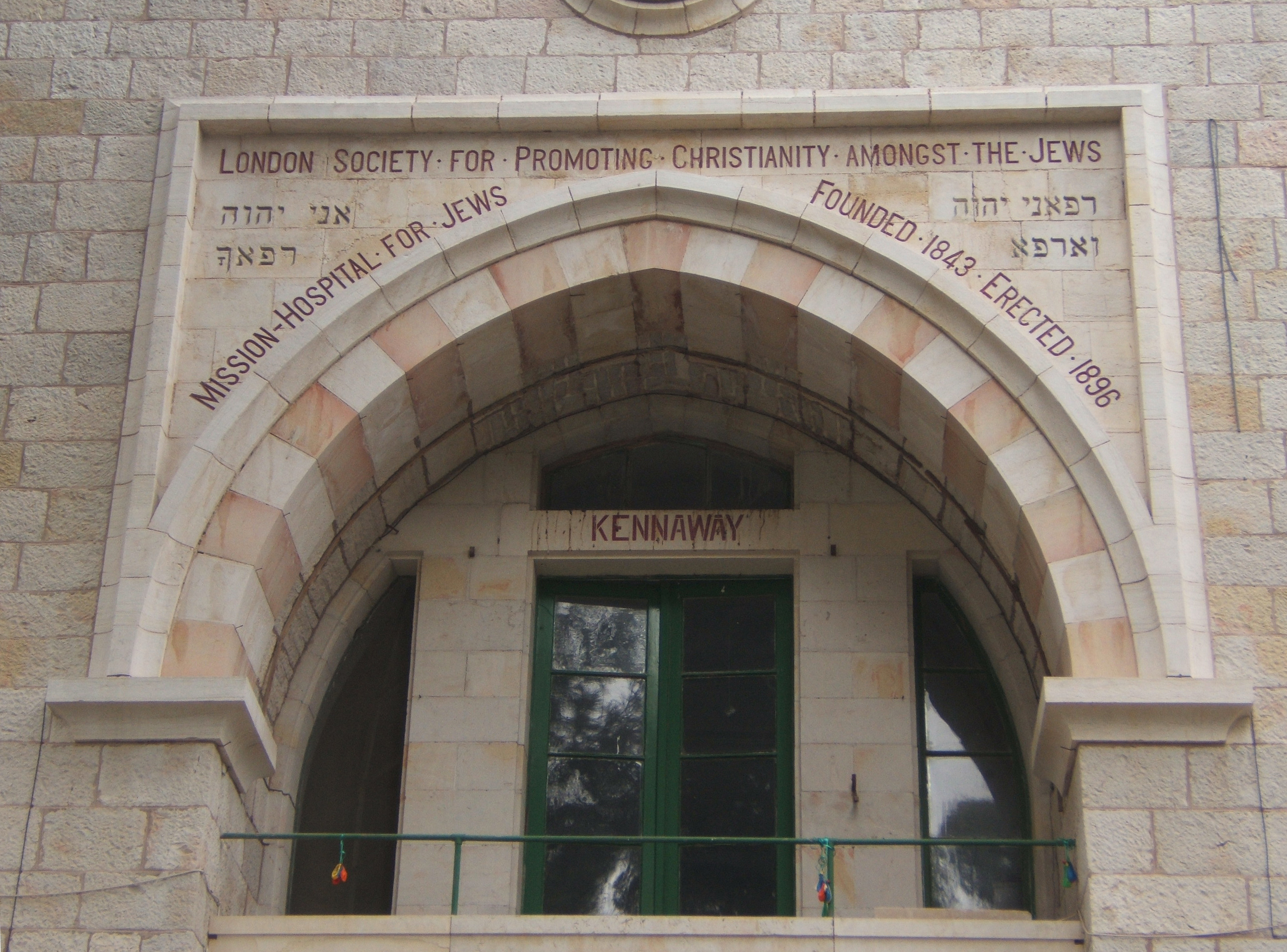
The English Mission Hospital in Jerusalem has "London Society for Promoting Christianity Amongst the Jews" inscribed above its front door.

Among Christians, there are those who believe in a conversion of the Jews to Christianity en masse, which they typically consider an end-time event. Some Christian denominations consider the universal conversion of Jews necessary and urgent and, therefore, make it their mission to proselytize them. As a result, groups in support of Jews practicing Judaism have arisen to counter Christian proselytization.

== In the New Testament ==
The biblical basis for this expectation is found in Romans 11:

I do not want you to be ignorant of this mystery, brothers, so that you may not be conceited: Israel has experienced a hardening in part until the full number of the Gentiles has come in. And so all Israel will be saved... (NIV).

The meaning of Romans 11:25–26a is disputed. Douglas J. Moo calls Romans 11:26a "the storm center in the interpretation of Romans 9–11 and of New Testament teaching about the Jews and 'their' future." Moo himself interprets the passage as predicting a "large-scale conversion of Jewish people at the end of this age" through "faith in the gospel of Jesus their Messiah".

Pope Benedict XVI, in his book Jesus of Nazareth: Holy Week, suggested that the Christian church should not be targeting Jews for conversion efforts, since "Israel is in the hands of God, who will save it 'as a whole' at the proper time."

== In church history ==
Throughout the history of the Christian church, there have been predicted or expected mass conversions of Jews as imminent. Most famous among these predictions was Martin Luther's early enthusiasm that the event would occur through Protestant gospel preaching. When this did not happen, Luther changed his attitude, writing On the Jews and Their Lies, in which he appears to reject the possibility of Jewish conversion and expresses anti-Jewish contempt.

Other Protestant Reformers accepted the idea of a mass conversion of the Jews, including Martin Bucer, Peter Martyr Vermigli, and Theodore Beza. It was a popular idea among the Puritans. Puritan works on the subject included The Calling of the Jews (William Gouge, 1621), Some Discourses upon the Point of the Conversion of the Jews (Moses Wall, 1650), and The Mystery of Israel's Salvation Explained and Applied (Increase Mather, 1669). There was disagreement over when this prophesied conversion would take place: a significant minority, beginning with Thomas Brightman (1607) and Elnathan Parr (1620), predicted a Jewish conversion before the end of time, one that would inaugurate an era of worldwide blessing. The view of an era of blessing preceding the return of Jesus became known as postmillennialism.

It has been argued that it was the German Pietist leader Phillip Jacob Spener who understood the conversion of the Jews to be a central task given to Christianity writ large—at least as expressed in his 1675 publication Pia Desiderata; he added his own apocalyptic speculations, as well. In his estimation, Jesus would not return until the church writ large had obeyed the command to preach the Christian gospel "to the Jew first", echoing the words of Paul the Apostle in the New Testament. Spener's successor, August Hermann Francke, as leader of the German Pietists, developed sophisticated methods of Jewish proselytizing from the movement's base at the University of Halle. The Pietist influence significantly shaped British evangelicals in the early 19th century, leading to the founding of the London Society for Promoting Christianity Amongst the Jews in 1809.

The mass conversion of the Jews continued to be the hope of British evangelicals in the 18th and 19th centuries. Iain Murray said of Charles Simeon that "the conversion of the Jews was perhaps the warmest interest in his life" and that he would choose the conversion of 6 million Jews over the conversion of 600 million gentiles, since the former would ostensibly lead to the latter. It was also a key concern of the Church of Scotland, which in 1839 sent Robert Murray M'Cheyne and Andrew Bonar to Palestine on a "Mission of Inquiry into the state of the Jews".

The mass conversion of the Jews plays a central role in dispensationalism. Hal Lindsey, one of the most influential American promoters of dispensationalism, wrote in The Late Great Planet Earth that, per Ezekiel (39:6–8), after Jews fight off a "Russian" invasion, Jews will see this as a miracle and convert to Christianity.

Occasionally, Christians have predicted a specific date for this event. Henry Archer, for example, in his 1642 work The Personall Reigne of Christ Upon Earth, expected the mass conversion of Jews to occur in the 1650s: 1290 years (a number derived from Daniel 12:11) after Julian the Apostate's reign.

== In Christian-Jewish relations ==
Attempts by Christians to convert Jews to Christianity is an important issue in Christian-Jewish relations and Christian-Jewish reconciliation. Jewish groups such as the Anti-Defamation League have denounced attempts to convert Jews to Christianity as causing antisemitism. Pope Benedict XVI in 2011 suggested that the church should not be targeting Jews for conversion efforts, since "Israel is in the hands of God, who will save it ‘as a whole’ at the proper time." A number of Progressive Christian denominations have publicly declared that they will no longer proselytize Jews, while other mainline Christian and conservative Christian churches have said they will continue their efforts to evangelize among Jews, saying that this is not antisemitic.

A 2008 survey of American Christians by the Pew Forum on Religion and Public Life found that over 60% of most denominations believe that Jews will receive eternal life after death alongside Christians.

== Christian liturgy ==
In Catholic liturgy, a prayer for the conversion of the Jews is found in the Good Friday prayer for the Jews. The wording of the prayer has undergone numerous changes, and although the specific hope of a mass conversion is not envisaged in the prayer, the 2008 version of the prayer makes reference to Romans 11:26 ("all Israel be saved"). The 2008 version of the prayer reads:

Let us also pray for the Jews: That our God and Lord may illuminate their hearts, that they acknowledge Jesus Christ is the Savior of all men... Almighty and eternal God, who want that all men be saved and come to the recognition of the truth, propitiously grant that even as the fullness of the peoples enters Thy Church, all Israel be saved. ...

A 2011 retranslation now reads:

Let us pray also for the Jewish people, to whom the Lord our God spoke first, that he may grant them to advance in love of his name and in faithfulness to his covenant... Almighty ever-living God, who bestowed your promises on Abraham and his descendants, hear graciously the prayers of your Church, that the people you first made your own may attain the fullness of redemption....

The Directory of Public Worship approved by the Westminster Assembly states that a prayer is to be made for the conversion of the Jews. The service of Vespers on Great Friday in the Eastern Orthodox Church and Byzantine Catholic churches uses the expression "impious and transgressing people", but the strongest expressions are in the Orthros of Great Friday, which includes the same phrase, but also speaks of "the murderers of God, the lawless nation of the Jews" and referring to "the assembly of the Jews", prays: "But give them, O Lord, their reward, for they devised vain things against Thee."

== Cultural references ==
The conversion of the Jews is occasionally used in literature as a symbol of the far distant future. In Andrew Marvell's poem To His Coy Mistress, it says, "And you should, if you please, refuse / Till the conversion of the Jews."

"The Conversion of the Jews" is the title of a 1958 short story by Philip Roth, in his collection Goodbye, Columbus, about a Jewish youth, Oscar (Ozzie), who threatens to jump off his synagogue's roof unless his rabbi, mother, and co-religionists state that God could, should he wish to, make a son miraculously, without the common method of intercourse.

== See also ==
- Christian Zionism
- Jewish Christian
- Jews for Jesus
- Supersessionism
