= Henry Archer (Fifth Monarchist) =

Henry Archer (died c. 1642), also known as John Archer, was a Fifth Monarchist. His book The Personall Reigne of Christ Upon Earth (1642) was popular in the 1650s.

== Ministry ==
Archer lectured in London before being suspended by Archbishop Laud. In 1631 he was presented to All Saints' Church, Hertford by the Feoffees for Impropriations but had fled the country by 1637. He served as pastor of the English church at Arnhem until his death. He was probably influenced by Thomas Goodwin.

== The Personall Reigne of Christ Upon Earth ==
In The Personall Reigne of Christ Upon Earth, Archer made a number of predictions. He argued that the conversion of the Jews would take place in either 1650 or 1656. He calculated this date by taking the 1290 days of Daniel 12:11 as years, and counting from Julian the Apostate, the dating of whose reign was uncertain. Archer also said that the papacy would disappear in 1666. He obtained this date by interpreting the 1260 days in Revelation 12:6 as years, and counting from 406, which is when he thought "the Bishop of Rome began to usurp Papall power, and about that time some of the 10. Kingdomes in Europe began to arise." The ten kingdoms that Archer refers are those thought to be represented by the ten toes on the image that Nebuchadnezzar saw in Daniel 2, following a historicist interpretation. Thirdly, Archer predicted that Christ would return in around 1700 – this date being calculated by taking the 1335 days of Daniel 12:12 as years, and counting from the end of Julian the Apostate's reign. Archer argued that this would precede a literal thousand year reign of the saints on earth, but not with Christ literally present.

Katherine Hermes suggests that Archer's book set the stage for the coalescence of the Fifth Monarchists in England.

== See also ==
- List of dates predicted for apocalyptic events
- Predictions and claims for the Second Coming of Christ
