= Annie Keeler =

Early American woman doctor

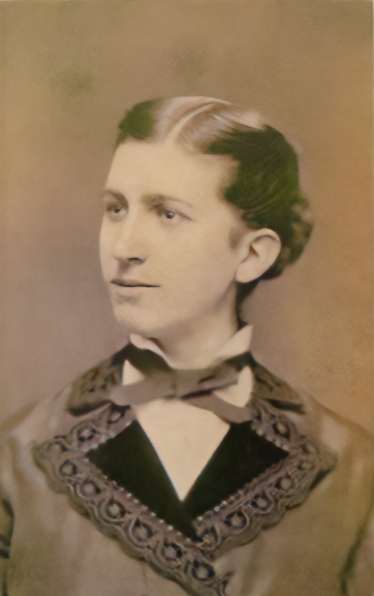
- Born: Annie Keeler Bailey; November 6, 1855; Brooklyn, New York, US
- Died: March 6, 1927 (aged 71); Danbury, Connecticut, US
- Burial place: Ridgefield, Connecticut, US
- Education: Connecticut State Normal School; Woman's Medical College of the New York Infirmary
- Occupations: Physician, surgeon
- Years active: 1885–1927
- Known for: Early woman physician
- Parents: Halcyon Gilbert Bailey (father); Emily Bailey (mother)

Annie Keeler (born Annie Keeler Bailey; November 6, 1855 – March 6, 1927) was an American physician in Danbury, Connecticut. She was an early woman physician at the turn of the 19th century, and a prolific writer on the topics of medicine, Christianity, and temperance.

== Biography ==
Keeler was born on November 6, 1855, in Brooklyn, New York. Her parents were Halcyon Gilbert Bailey and Emily Keeler Bailey. Her parents moved to Ridgebury, Connecticut in 1862, when she was about 7. Her 5-year-old brother Clayton died shortly after, in 1863. Her parents divorced in 1872 and Keeler remained with her mother and her mother's family.

=== Education ===
Keeler went to college at the Connecticut State Normal School (now Central Connecticut State University). She graduated from the Normal School as part of the class of 1876 and taught in Ridgebury for a few years. In 1885 at age 30, Annie Keeler graduated from the Woman's Medical College of the New York Infirmary.

=== Career ===
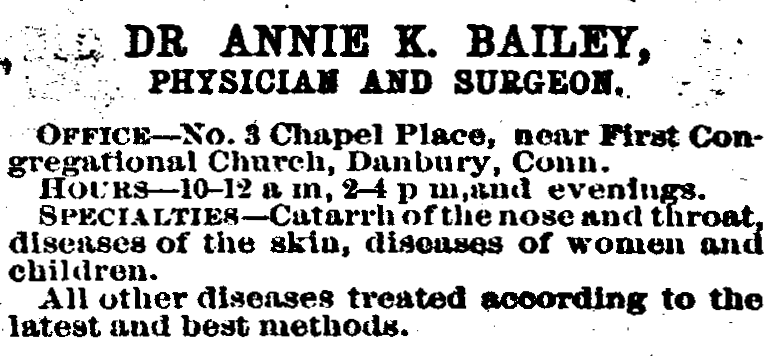
Newspaper advertisement for Dr. Annie K. Bailey

She practiced medicine for "nearly one year" at the New York Infirmary, then moved back to Western Connecticut in 1886. She set up a practice in Danbury, CT. She was one of the first three women physicians in that city. She taught at the Danbury Hospital Training School for Nurses for 11 years and, in 1892, was instrumental in the formation of the Danbury Graduate Nurses' association. Meetings were held in her home for years, until regular meeting rooms were obtained.

In 1901, she predicted the end of the world based on an astronomical confluence.

=== Name change ===
In 1908, after both her parents had died, Keeler petitioned the Superior Court for a name change. At the time, she was known as "Annie Keeler Bailey" and she wished to drop her father's name to (as the newspapers put it) "free the honor of her mother's family from the taint arising from the name of her father". She said "Father was a man addicted to excessive dissipation, shocking immorality, and profanity. He was a disgrace to the family." Her petition was granted.

== Death ==
In 1927, Keeler was struck by a vehicle while crossing the street at a crosswalk, a block from her home. She died of her injuries shortly afterward.

== Bibliography ==
- 1895: Prophecies Fulfilled in History
- 1896: Prophecies in Course of Fulfillment
- 1899: A Spiritual Refreshing: How We may Get It
- 1900: "Why Alcohol Is Not a Food", a speech given at a convention of the Woman's Christian Temperance Union, June 1900 in Shelton, CT
- 1898: "Treatment of Diphtheria", in which Dr. Keeler suggested "sublimated sulphur and permanganate of potassium" in the treatment of Diphtheria
- 1903: Manual of parliamentary law: arranged for deliberative assemblies of women
- 1905: "Facts Every Physician Should Know", a discussion of the ills of alcohol as they relate to the human body
- 1905: "Causes", Dr. Keeler writes about what she perceives as the causes of various ailments–hay fever, cancer, etc.
- 1905: "Oil of Hyssop". an article on the usage of Oil of Hyssop in treating syphilis and uterine cancer. She states "Personally, I am intensely interested in the authentic virtues of this volatile, essential (ethereal or distilled) oil."
- 1905: "Cerebro Spinal Meningitis"
- 1906: Jesus the Messiah and His Instructions
- 1908: God's Plan of Salvation
- 1911: "Columbus the Son of a Jew and Jewess"
- 'An Address on the differences in microscopes', given to The Graduate Nurses Association, November 1916 in Danbury, CT
