= Pyotr Kuznetsov =

Russian Orthodox cult leader (born 1964)

Pyotr Kuznetsov (Russian: Пётр Кузнецов; born 1964) is the leader and founder of the Russian religious group, the True Russian Orthodox Church. Kuznetsov did not let his followers watch television, listen to the radio or handle money. The group has been referred to as a "Doomsday cult".

Kuznetsov is a divorced architect from Belarus, who wandered all across Russia to spread his message of the impending apocalypse before settling in the village of Nikolskoye. He has been diagnosed as schizophrenic, and according to The Guardian, he sleeps in a coffin.

On April 3, 2008, Kuznetsov attempted suicide. He and his followers had been hiding in a cave in Russia's Penza region in anticipation of Kuznetsov' prediction that the world would end. Officials speculated his suicide attempt may have been caused by realising his prediction had been wrong."
