= RaptureTok =

Social media hashtag

#RaptureTok (also stylized as "RaptureTok" or "Rapture Tok") was a viral hashtag used on social media, particularly on TikTok.

== Background ==
The hashtag was used in September 2025 to promote or mock a Christian-based end of the world prediction for the 23 or 24 September by South African Christian Joshua Mhlakela in an interview that prior June. It was another in a series of failed Rapture predictions.

In preparation, people posted about selling their possessions, leaving their jobs, taking time off work, selling their cars, and leaving notes for those left behind, while others made jokes and created memes, as part of approximately 300,000 posts on the topic on TikTok.

Experts, such as Kim Haines-Eitzen (professor of religion at Cornell), said the phenomenon was a sign of a culture in distress. Robert D. Cornwall, a minister in the Christian Church (Disciples of Christ), said, "Interest in the Second Coming of Christ, the rapture and other predictions of the end of the world often emerges during times of stress and anxiety", adding that:

In this moment, there is great uncertainty about the economy, political instability, the rise of authoritarianism around the globe, including the United States, along with wars and rumors of wars, all of which create anxiety [...] making [the larger population] susceptible to suggestions that Jesus might soon return and remove true believers from the Earth before the times of tribulation arrive.

Matthew Gabriele, professor in the Department of Religion and Culture at Virginia Tech, said:

Usually when things are getting 'really bad', that's when the elect will be saved. So it's not a surprise that [people are predicting the rapture] in this particular moment, where there's political violence, economic concerns, disease, etc – these are very common tropes within apocalyptic texts.

== Aftermath ==
After the date came and went, there were mixed responses from those who had believed the Rapture imminent. Some expressed disappointment, regret and heartbreak. Others reinterpreted the prophecy, which Cornell Associate Professor of sociology Landon Schnabel described as fitting a "pattern we've seen for centuries: prediction, failure, reinterpretation, new prediction".

For his part, Mhlakela stated that the Rapture would actually occur on October 6th, 7th or 8th based on the Julian calendar.

== See also ==
- Rapture
- List of dates predicted for apocalyptic events
