= Leland Jensen =

Founder of a Baha'i sect (1914–1996)

- Born: 22 August 1914
- Died: 6 August 1996 (aged 81)
- Education: Doctorate in natural medicine and chiropractic
- Known for: Founder of Baha'is Under the Provisions of the Covenant
- Spouses: Opal Jensen (m. 1938; died 1990) Frances Wind Jensen (m. 1991–1996)

Leland Jensen (22 August 1914 – 6 August 1996) was the leader of a small apocalyptic cult called the Baháʼís Under the Provisions of the Covenant (BUPC). Jensen was originally a member of the mainstream Baháʼí Faith until he was excommunicated in 1960 for supporting Mason Remey's attempt at schism. He later left Remey's group due to infighting and began teaching that he would re-establish the Baháʼí Faith after a nuclear holocaust, which he predicted would occur in 1980. At its peak, his movement had 150-200 followers, mostly in Montana, but declined in size significantly by 1990 and beyond.

Jensen and his followers gained national media attention for their commitment to his prophecy of nuclear annihilation on 29 April 1980. They built fallout shelters, distributed leaflets, and urged others to take heed of the warning. Due to the "painfully obvious" nature of the failed prophecy, they became a case study in cognitive dissonance.

== Background ==
Jensen was a third generation Baháʼí on his mother's side. He and his wife, Opal, received doctorates in natural medicine, becoming chiropractic doctors. They attended the School of Drugless Physicians and graduated in 1944. Opal was the valedictorian and Jensen graduated with distinction (cum laude).

After they graduated, and after practicing for a while, they moved to St. Louis. In 1953 Shoghi Effendi launched the Ten Year Crusade, which aimed at bringing the message of Baháʼu'lláh to the entire world. Jensen and his wife gave up their practice and went to two tiny islands in the Indian Ocean off the coast of Madagascar. The first island was the French island of Réunion, which practiced Catholicism as the state religion. He then stayed six months in Mauritius. Jensen and his wife were the first Baháʼís to visit these islands, and therefore received the title of Knights of Baháʼu'lláh. More than 200 Baháʼís received the title after moving to areas designated by Shoghi Effendi. His wife Opal died in 1990.

=== Mason Remey ===
When Shoghi Effendi died in 1957 there were no eligible appointees who met the required conditions for successorship, and he died without having appointed a successor Guardian. Mason Remey was among the nine Hands of the Cause elected as an interim authority until the election of the first Universal House of Justice in 1963. However, in 1960 Remey declared himself to be the successor of Shoghi Effendi, and expected the allegiance of the world's Baháʼís. Subsequently, Remey was unanimously declared a Covenant-breaker by the Hands and expelled. Jensen was among about 100 supporters of Remey.

In 1963 Mason Remey set up a National Assembly in the United States, which was dissolved in 1966. Leland Jensen was among the members elected in 1963, and in 1964 he left the group during a time of disputes among the members and moved to Missoula, Montana with his wife where they opened a chiropractic clinic.

=== Prison ===
In 1969 he was convicted of performing "a lewd and lascivious act" for sexually molesting a 15-year-old female patient, and served four years of a twenty-year sentence in the Montana State Prison.

It was in prison that Jensen claimed to have a revelation, and converted several dozen inmates to his idea of being the "Establisher" of the Baháʼí Faith, stemming from his belief that the administration of the religion had been corrupted, and that he was chosen by God to re-establish the administration.

He recruited many followers in prison. After he was paroled in 1973 and before Remey's death, Jensen formed a group called the Baháʼís Under the Provisions of the Covenant. By 1979, his apocalyptic prophecy was receiving national press coverage and he had attracted followers in Wyoming, Colorado, and Arkansas.

== Disconfirmed prophecies ==
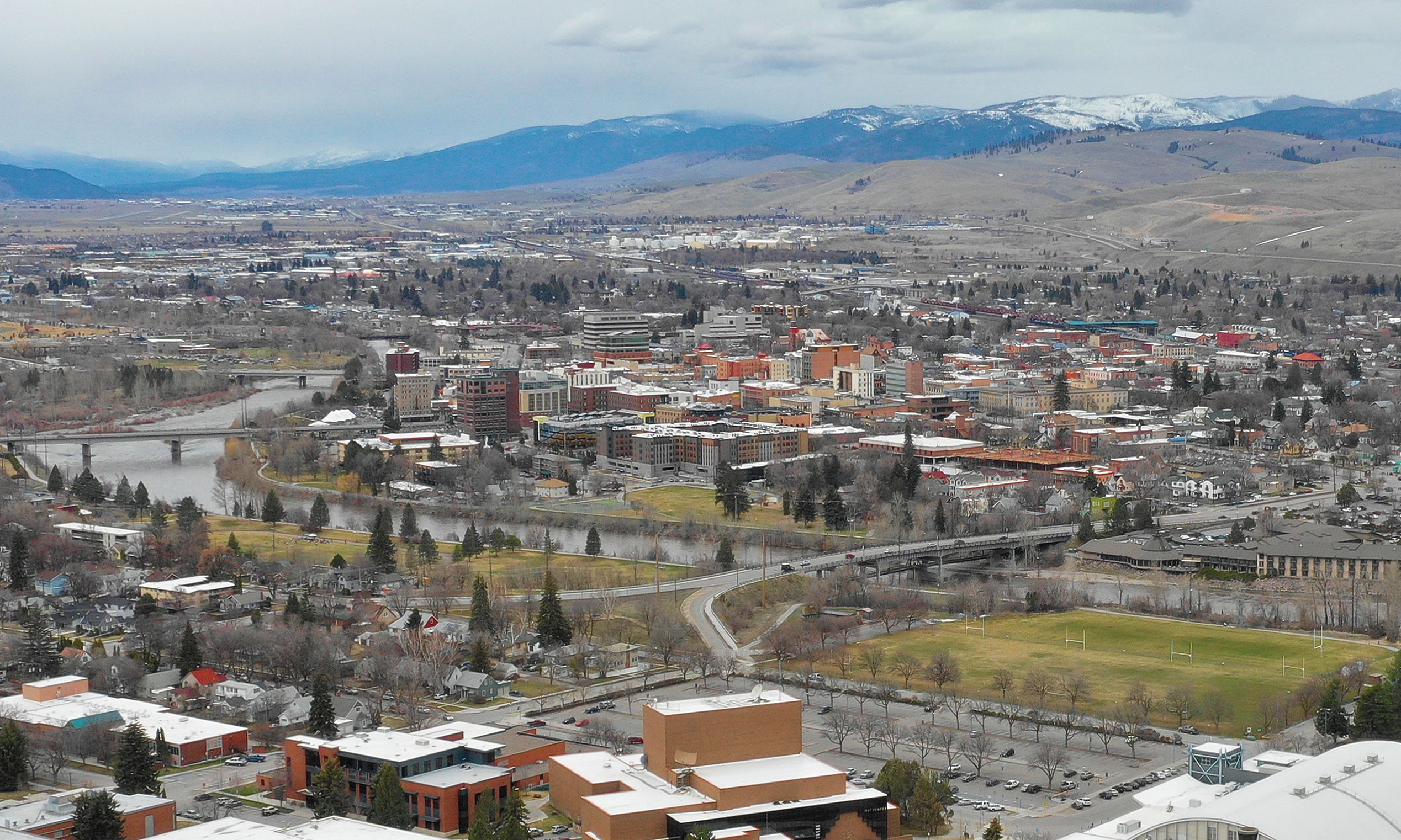
Missoula, Montana, the headquarters of Jensen's apocalyptic cult.

Between 1979 and 1995 Jensen, and his companion Neal Chase, made twenty specific predictions centering nuclear attacks, worldwide catastrophes, and some smaller scale disasters. Jensen himself set two of the dates, while Chase set the other 18. Between 1980 and 1996, four researchers took part in group activities and even stayed the night in three BUPC fallout shelters in 1980.

=== Nuclear holocaust ===
Jensen began teaching as early as 1971 that in 1980 the world would be cleansed of evil by a nuclear holocaust. In 1979, approximately 6 years after being released from prison, Jensen began teaching his followers that on 29 April 1980 a nuclear holocaust would kill a third of the world's population, and that over the next twenty years, the planet would be ravaged until in the year 2000 "God's Kingdom" would be established and a thousand years of peace would follow. On the fateful night, Jensen led a group of followers into fallout shelters in Missoula, Montana.

The disconfirmed prophecy resulted in Jensen losing several contingents of adherents, and his response was that he was right all along. Over the following years Jensen used several types of explanations, as noted by researcher Robert Balch,

1. The prediction was fulfilled spiritually rather than physically.
2. The prophecy was fulfilled physically, but not in the manner expected.
3. The date was off because of a miscalculation.
4. The date was a prediction, not a prophecy.
5. The leaders had a moral responsibility to warn the public despite the date's uncertainty.
6. God had given the world a reprieve.
7. The prediction had been a test of members' faith.

Jensen's followers had made substantial commitments to the prophecy, building shelters, writing letters to government agencies and newspapers, and distributed thousands of leaflets urging fellow Missoulians to build fall-out shelters. To them the disconfirmation was "painfully obvious", and researchers used them as a case study in cognitive dissonance.

When asked by a UPI reporter Jensen did not express concern that the prediction might not come true, remarking "There will be a nuclear holocaust some day."

=== Halley's Comet ===
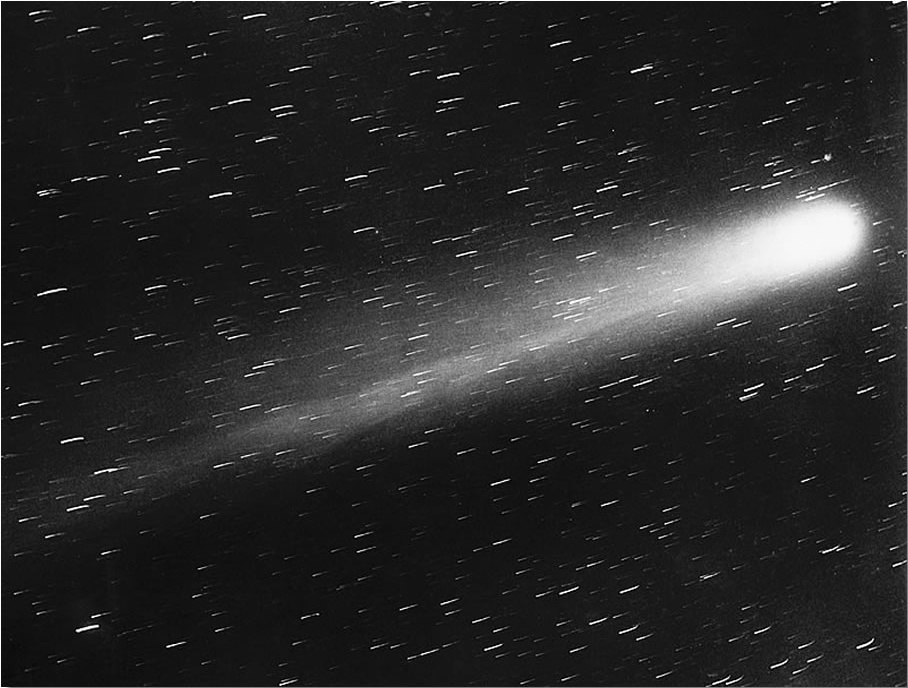
A photograph of Halley's Comet taken at Yerkes Observatory on 29 May 1910

After the 1980 event, Jensen introduced the idea that the seven-year Tribulation had begun on the date of his prediction of a nuclear holocaust, and thus committed himself to another event happening on the same date in 1987. In 1985 he made the prediction that Halley's Comet would enter Earth's orbit on 29 April 1986, and collide with the Earth exactly one year later. In the interim year, he taught that the comet would break apart, pelt the Earth with debris, and produce massive earthquakes. The new prophecy rekindled his followers, who became excited with the new idea.

As opposed to the first prediction, this time his followers made very little commitments to the prophecy and began making disclaimers even before the 1986 event. When the members gathered on the night before the comet was supposed to enter Earth's orbit, nobody mentioned the comet. Jensen later said that the massive earthquakes were fulfilled by a "spiritual earthquake" when one of his important followers defected and left him.

=== Neal Chase ===
With Jensen's approval, in the early 1990s his protege Neal Chase made a total of 18 predictions which pertained to small-scale disasters that he claimed would lead step-by-step towards apocalypse, as well as dates for a nuclear attack on New York City. He based these predictions on Biblical or Hopi prophecies, planetary conjunctions, dreams, or Nostradamus. Balch noted that Chase responded to the 18 disconfirmed prophecies with a number of "face-saving strategies", including drawing a distinction between prediction and prophecy, claiming miscalculation, reprieve, and tests of faith. Chase later proclaimed "We didn't make a mistake," and that they have "a 100 percent track record!"

== Size and demographics of the Baháʼís Under the Provisions of the Covenant ==
Jensen's followers consisted of roughly 150 people leading up to 1980, but declined in size following the disconfirmed prophecy, with almost all of the believers outside of Montana eventually rejecting Jensen's teachings. By 1990 there were fewer than 100 adherents, and defection continued in the 1990s and beyond. In 1994 a membership phone list showed 66 members in Missoula, Montana, and less than 20 in other states. A leadership dispute from 2001-2005 fractured the few remaining members. Adherents were mostly concentrated in Montana.

A Montana university researcher has noted that since 1980, BUPC membership has never exceeded 200 nationwide. During a phone survey by a Harvard researcher, someone representing the community claimed 30 members in the headquarters of Missoula, Montana in 2003, as well as some members in Denver and Alaska.

== Death and legacy ==
Jensen considered himself restoring the rightful Baháʼí leadership, which he believed had been passed to Remey's adopted son Pepe Remey. Pepe denied this claim, refused association with Jensen's group, and died in 1994 while Jensen was still alive.

Jensen approached old age with disconfirmed prophecies, declining membership, and no Guardian to speak of. Jensen began hinting that Neal Chase might be the next Guardian before he died in 1996.

=== Leadership dispute ===
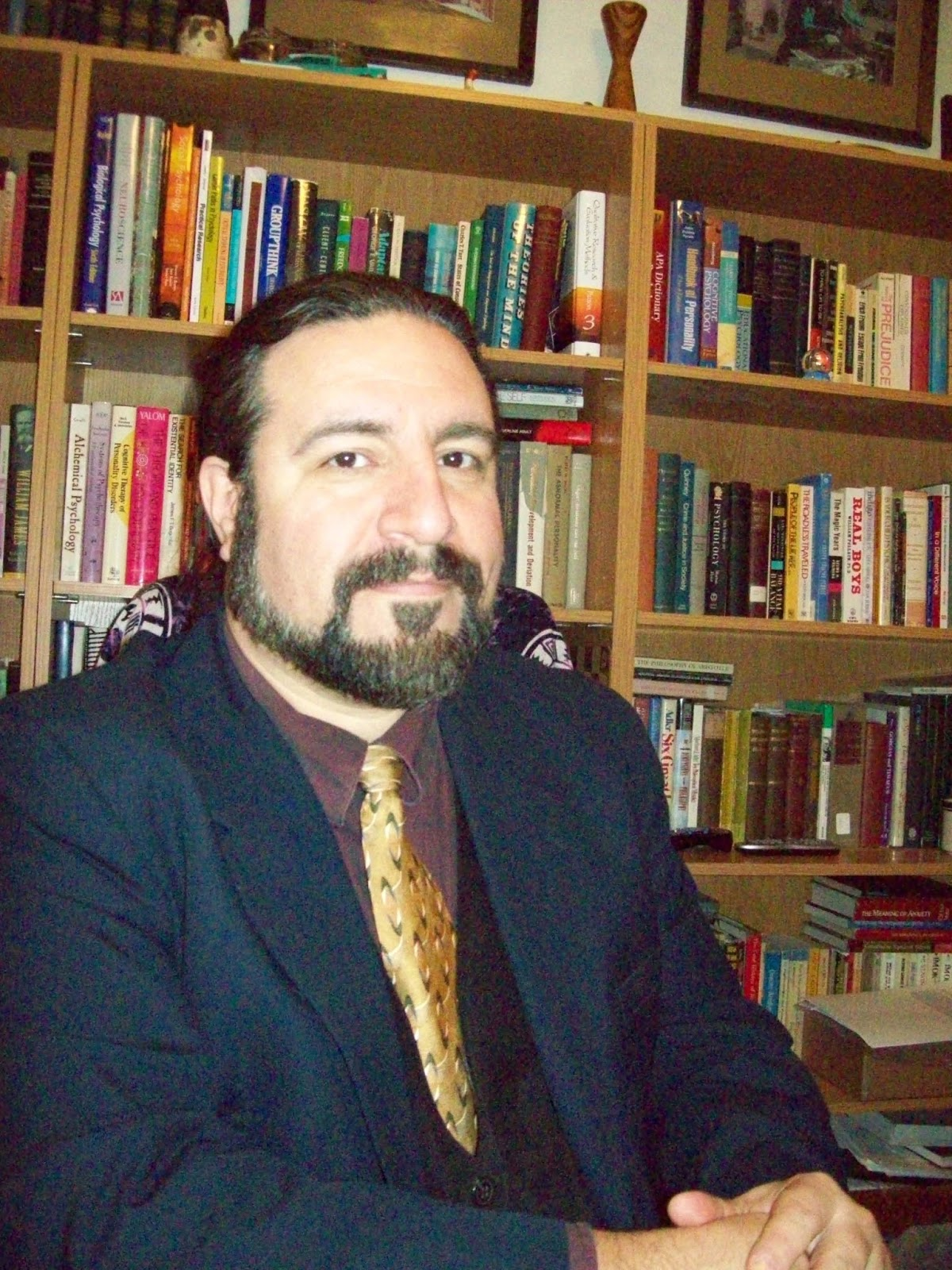
Neal Chase (c. 2017).

In 1991 Jensen appointed 12 members to a second International Baháʼí Council (sIBC), modeled on the International Baháʼí Council set up by Shoghi Effendi, and Jensen registered it in 1993 as a non-profit corporation in Montana.

In 2001, Neal Chase claimed to have been secretly adopted by Pepe and that he was the Guardian and rightful heir to the council's funds and property. The treasurer of the council responded by declaring Neal Chase a Covenant-breaker, and Chase subsequently claimed that failing to recognize him as the Guardian amounted to Covenant-breaking.

The majority members of the sIBC filed a complaint on 26 April 2002, seeking an order granting damages against Chase, including interest and attorney's fees; and an injunction forbidding Chase to represent the council. Chase filed a motion to dismiss on July 15, 2003, arguing that a judicial resolution would require a court to interpret religious doctrine. The motion was granted September 29, 2003. The case was appealed to the Supreme Court of Montana in 2004, and a decision came February 15, 2005: "This dispute revolves around two basic issues: the composition of the Board, and the powers of the presidency in relation to the church property... The District Court has no power either to anoint a successor to any religious office, or to invalidate any claim thereto. If these two issues can be resolved on purely secular grounds, then the District Court can apply corporate, property, and tort law in deciding the merits of the Board's conversion and other claims against Chase." The case was remanded to the lower court for further proceedings.

== See also ==
- Attempted schisms in the Baháʼí Faith
