= Unfulfilled Christian religious predictions =

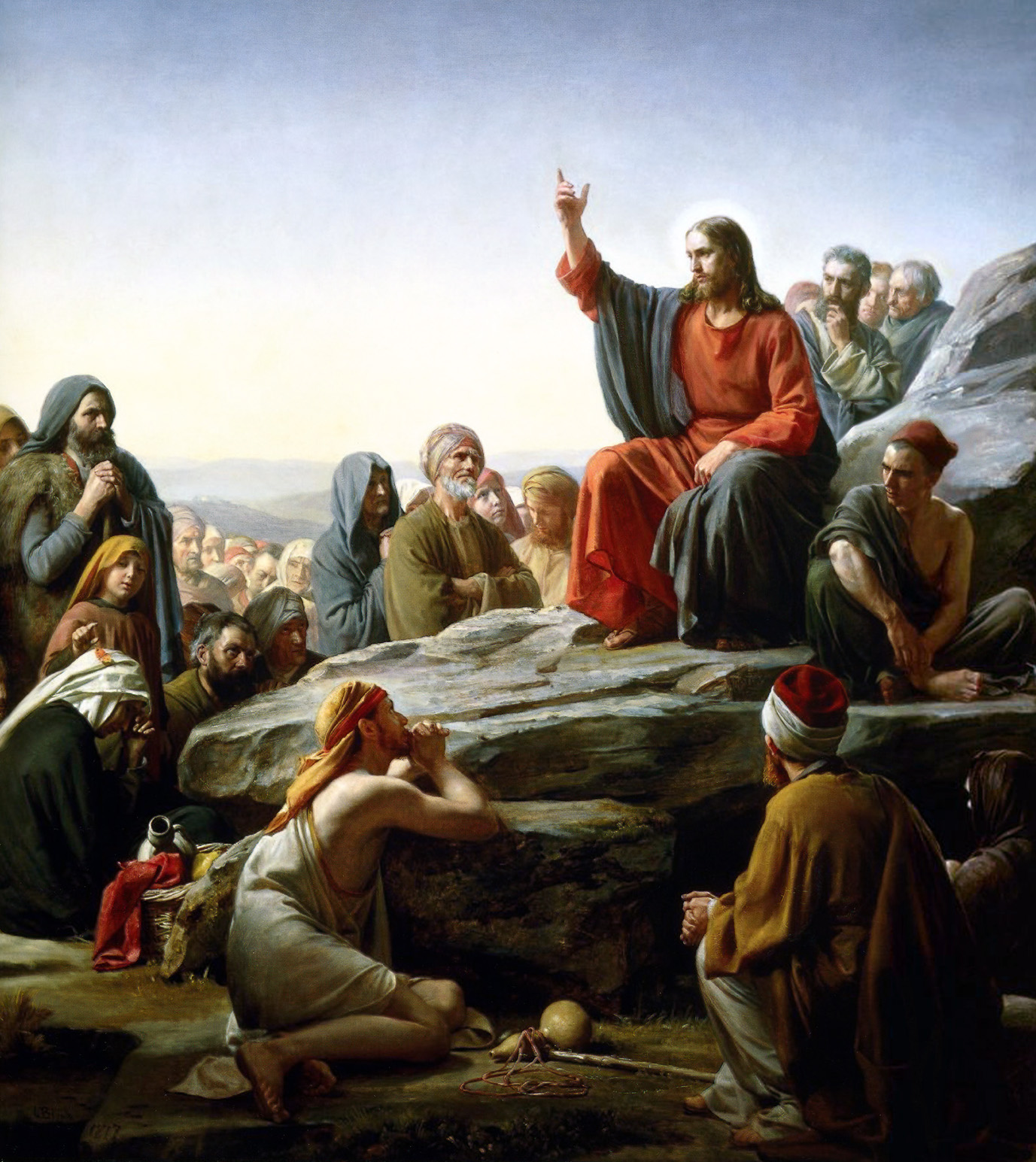
The Sermon on the Mount, where Jesus warns of the false prophets who are to come, by Carl Heinrich Bloch, 19th century

This article lists Christian religious predictions that failed to come about in the specified time frame, listed by religious group.

== Adventism, Millerism ==
Adventism has its roots in the teachings of the Baptist preacher William Miller. He first predicted that the Second Advent of Christ would occur before March 21, 1844. When that date passed he revised his prediction to April 18, 1844. After that date also passed, another Millerite, Samuel S. Snow, derived the date of October 22, 1844. The failure of those predictions has been named the Millerite Great Disappointment.

On May 27, 1856, Ellen G. White, prophet of the Seventh-day Adventist church, wrote: "I was shown the company present at the Conference, Said the angel: 'Some food for worms, some subjects of the seven last plagues, some will be alive and remain upon the earth to be translated at the coming of Jesus.'" A newborn attendee at that conference would have been 100 years old in 1956. "As more and more of the conference attendees died off, the faithful became increasingly excited about soon seeing Jesus. Fifty-four years after the prophecy, they made a check-off list of attendees to show who was still alive and who was deceased—because it was prophesied that Jesus would return while some of them were still alive."

== Anabaptist Church ==
Certain Anabaptists of the early 16th century believed that the Millennium would occur in 1533. Another source reports: "When the prophecy failed, the Anabaptists became more zealous and claimed that two witnesses (Enoch and Elijah) had come in the form of Jan Matthys and Jan Bockelson; they would set up the New Jerusalem in Münster. Münster became a frightening dictatorship under Bockelson's control. Although all Lutherans and Catholics were expelled from that city, the millennium never came."

== Anglican Church ==
In volume II of The Prophetic Faith of Our Fathers, author Leroy Edwin Froom wrote about a prominent Anglican prelate, who predicted:

Edwin Sandys (1519–1588), Archbishop of York and Primate of England was born in Lancashire... Sandys says, "Now, as we know not the day and time, so let us be assured that this coming of the Lord is near. He is not slack, as we do count slackness. That it is at hand, it may be probably gathered out of the Scriptures in diverse places. The signs mentioned by Christ in the Gospel which should be the foreshewers of this terrible day, are almost all fulfilled."

== Assemblies of God Church ==
During World War I, The Weekly Evangel, an official publication of the Assemblies of God, predicted: "We are not yet in the Armageddon struggle proper, but at its commencement, and it may be, if students of prophecy read the signs aright, that Christ will come before the present war closes, and before Armageddon...The war preliminary to Armageddon, it seems, has commenced." Other editions speculated that the end would come no later than 1934 or 1935.

== Calvary Chapel ==
The founder of the Calvary Chapel system, Chuck Smith, published the book End Times in 1979. On the jacket of his book, Smith is called a "well known Bible scholar and prophecy teacher". In the book he wrote:

As we look at the world scene today, it would appear that the coming of the Lord is very, very, close. Yet, we do not know when it will be. It could be that the Lord will wait for a time longer. If I understand Scripture correctly, Jesus taught us that the generation which sees the 'budding of the fig tree', the birth of the nation Israel, will be the generation that sees the Lord's return; I believe that the generation of 1948 is the last generation. Since a generation of judgment is forty years and the tribulation lasts seven years, I believe the Lord could come back for his church anytime before the tribulation starts, which would mean anytime before 1981. (1948 + 40 − 7 = 1981) However, it is possible that Jesus is dating the beginning of the generation from 1967, when Jerusalem was again under Israeli control for the first time since 587 BC. We don't know for sure which year actually marks the beginning of the last generation.

— Chuck Smith, End Times, pp. 35, 36

The pastor Hal Lindsey published the same view in his book, The Late Great Planet Earth.

== Catholic Church ==
From 1516, Catholic preachers were forbidden by the Fifth Council of the Lateran Session 11 from apocalyptic preaching with specific or general dates: preachers must not "presume to preach or declare a fixed time for future evils, the coming of antichrist or the precise day of judgment; for Truth says, it is not for us to know times or seasons which the Father has fixed by his own authority." Public preaching should be limited to "only what the people who flock to their sermons will find useful, by means of reflection and practical application, for rooting out vices, praising virtues and saving the souls of the faithful." In contrast, "in Lutheran Germany, scholars continued to reckon the date of Doomsday throughout the latter part of the [16th] century, thereby contributing to a heightened sense of urgency."

In 1771, Bishop Charles Walmesley (under the pen name "Signor Pastorini") published his "General History of the Christian Church from Her Birth to Her Final Triumphant State in Heaven Chiefly Deduced from the Apocalypse of St. John the Apostle and Evangelist". In it he described a fifth age of the Church as a duration of 300 years, beginning with the Protestant Reformation in 1520 or 1525. This was widely interpreted as predicting the downfall of Protestantism by 1825. Four years later, the Roman Catholic Relief Act 1829 ended the process of Catholic Emancipation throughout the United Kingdom of Great Britain and Ireland.

== Edward Irving ==
The Scottish cleric Edward Irving was the forerunner of the Catholic Apostolic Church. In 1828 he wrote a work entitled The Last Days: A Discourse on the Evil Character of These Our Times, Proving Them to be the 'Perilous Times' and the 'Last Days'. He believed that the world had already entered the "last days":

I conclude, therefore, that the last days... will begin to run from the time of God's appearing for his ancient people, and gathering them together to the work of destroying all Antichristian nations, of evangelising the world, and of governing it during the Millennium... The times and fullness of the times, so often mentioned in the New Testament, I consider as referring to the great period numbered by times...Now if this reasoning be correct, as there can be little doubt that the one thousand two hundred and sixty days concluded in the year 1792, and the thirty additional days in the year 1823, we are already entered upon the last days, and the ordinary life of a man will carry many of us to the end of them. If this be so, it gives to the subject with which we have introduced this year's ministry a very great importance indeed.

== Family Radio ==
Harold Camping, who was then president of Family Radio, stated that the rapture and Judgement Day would occur on May 21, 2011, and claimed the Bible as his source. He suggested it would happen at 6 p.m. local time with the rapture sweeping the world time zone by time zone. Following the failure of that prediction, Camping stated that the physical rapture would occur on October 21, 2011.

== Latter Day Saints ==
Joseph Smith, founder of the Mormon faith, made dozens of prophecies during his lifetime, many of which are recorded in the sacred texts of the Mormon faith. The prophecies included purported predictions of the Civil War, the second coming of Jesus, and several less significant predictions. Church apologists cite prophecies that they claim came true, and church critics cite prophecies that they claim did not come true.

== Lutheran Church ==
Michael Stiefel predicted the end of the world in 1533 and consequently lost his position as minister. He was given another position by Philip Melanchthon.

One later writer noted, "In all of [Martin Luther's] work there was a sense of urgency for the time was short... the world was heading for Armageddon in the war with the Turk."

Even after Luther's death in 1546, Lutheran leaders maintained the claim of the nearness of the end. About the year 1584, a Lutheran named Adam Nachenmoser wrote the volume Prognosticum Theologicum in which he predicted: "In 1590 the Gospel would be preached to all nations and a wonderful unity would be achieved. The last days would then be close at hand." Nachenmoser offered numerous conjectures about the date; 1635 seemed most likely.

The Lutheran Church–Missouri Synod issued a study in 1989 refuting any end times claims, declaring that "repeatedly taught by Jesus and the apostles is the truth that the exact hour of Christ's coming remains hidden in the secret counsels of God (Matt. 24:36)".

== Mennonites ==
Russian Mennonite minister Claas Epp, Jr. predicted that Christ would return on March 8, 1889, which was subsequently revised to 1891.

== Montanists ==
Montanus, who founded the Montanist movement in 156 AD, predicted that Jesus would return during the lifetime of the group's founding members.

== Presbyterian Church ==
Thomas Brightman, who lived from 1562 to 1607, has been called "one of the fathers of Presbyterianism in England." He predicted that "between 1650 and 1695 would see the conversion of the many Jews and a revival of their nation in Palestine...the destruction of the Papacy...the marriage of the Lamb and his wife."

Christopher Love, who lived from 1618 to 1651, predicted that Babylon would fall in 1758, God's anger against the wicked would be demonstrated in 1759, and a worldwide earthquake would occur in 1763.

== Watch Tower Society ==
Charles Taze Russell, the first president of the Watch Tower Society, calculated 1874 as the year of Christ's Second Coming, and taught that Christ was invisibly present and ruling from the heavens since that year. Russell proclaimed Christ's invisible return in 1874, the resurrection of the saints in 1875, and predicted the end of the "harvest" and the Rapture of the saints to heaven for 1878, and the final end of "the day of wrath" in 1914. 1874 was considered the end of 6,000 years of human history and the beginning of judgment by Christ. A 1917 Watch Tower Society publication predicted that in 1918, God would begin to destroy churches and millions of their members.

J. F. Rutherford, who succeeded Russell as president of the Watch Tower Society, predicted that the Millennium would begin in 1925, and that biblical figures such as Abraham, Isaac, Jacob, and David would be resurrected as "princes". The Watch Tower Society bought property and built a house, Beth Sarim, in California for their return.

=== Jehovah's Witnesses ===
Starting in 1966, statements in Jehovah's Witness literature (published by the Watch Tower Society) raised strong expectations that Armageddon could arrive in 1975. In 1974, Witnesses were commended for selling their homes and property to "finish out the rest of their days in this old system" in full-time preaching. In 1976, The Watchtower advised those who had been "disappointed" by unfulfilled expectations for 1975 to adjust their viewpoint because that understanding was "based on wrong premises". Four years later, the Watch Tower Society admitted its responsibility in building up hope regarding 1975.

== See also ==
- False prophet
- Jesus and Messianic prophecy
- List of dates predicted for apocalyptic events
- List of messiah claimants
- Predictions and claims for the Second Coming of Christ
- Religious views of Isaac Newton
- Second Coming
- Six ages of the world
