= True and Living Church of Jesus Christ of Saints of the Last Days =

Breakaway sect of The Church of Jesus Christ of Latter-day Saints (LDS Church)

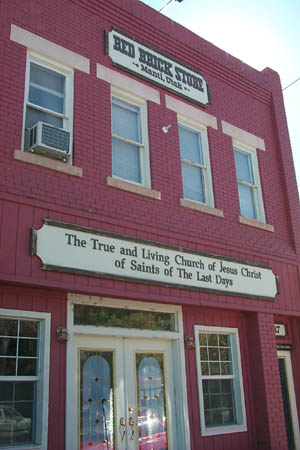
The Red Brick Store in Manti, Utah. Operated by the TLC Church.

The True and Living Church of Jesus Christ of Saints of the Last Days (TLC) is a breakaway sect of the Church of Jesus Christ of Latter-day Saints (LDS Church). It is headquartered in Manti, Utah, United States, where as of 2004 it maintained a membership of 300 to 500 adherents. The church has a meetinghouse in Manti, and in the past also owned a building in Manti called the Red Brick Store, not to be confused with the Red Brick Store in Nauvoo, Illinois.

== Establishment ==
James Harmston c. 2000

The church was organized on May 3, 1994, in response to what was felt to be a general apostasy of the LDS Church. This apostasy included Brigham Young (and subsequent presidents of the LDS Church) scattering the LDS Church membership rather than gathering it; the discontinuation of plural marriage; changes to ordinances and temple-related doctrine; and an increasing trend of what TLC describes as "watering-down" doctrine.

The TLC began as a study group and Priesthood Council in the early 1990s, where people from both the LDS Church and Mormon fundamentalist churches met together to discuss doctrine. During this period, the leader of the study group, James Dee Harmston (born November 6, 1940; died June 27, 2013), served a mission to Nauvoo. Prior to his retirement and founding of the TLC, Harmston worked as a real estate developer and lobbyist for the Reagan Administration.

A manuscript called "Further Light & Knowledge" dealing with research into the true order of prayer was published in 1990 by Ogden Kraut's publishing house, Pioneer Press. Gary Barns likely authored the manuscript, but authorship is not completely clear because an undated manuscript by the same title, believed to be written by Harmston, has been circulated in various Mormon fundamentalist discussion groups. In 1994, Harmston claimed the ancient biblical patriarchs Enoch, Noah, Abraham and Moses laid their hands on his head and conferred upon him the keys of the Melchizedek priesthood. Harmston then organized the church and collected his revelations in the Manti Revelation Book. He formally organized a hierarchy consisting of a President of the High Priesthood (himself), a Presiding Patriarch, a First Presidency, and a Quorum of Twelve Apostles.

One investigative article in 1996 wrote of the TLC's beginnings that:

Prior to the Fall of 1992, some members of the LDS Church in Manti and surrounding areas occasionally met together in study groups and informal gatherings to discuss their interpretations of the gospel. Some of these individuals already had Mormon Fundamentalist leanings ... Harmston, as well as other men and women, began to teach what they knew of the "original, pure" doctrines of Joseph Smith in their study groups as well as to interested individuals. This teaching began as informal discussions, evolving into a two-day, organized seminar referred to as the Models. Frustrated with the "dilution" of the "pure" doctrines taught by Joseph Smith, Harmston and his wife, Elaine, say they sought a closer relationship with God and answers to their questions about the modern-day practices of the LDS Church. They decided to seek those answers at home, in a prayer circle, using the "true order of prayer," as taught in LDS temples.

Jim and Elaine Harmston "donned their Mormon temple robes at home and created a makeshift altar from a pillow and piano bench topped by a white bed sheet. They knelt to utilize the 'true order of prayer,' a ritual said to facilitate otherworldly communication ... They say God gave them the same answer He gave Smith (in the grove when asking what church to join) only this time He said the current church was among the 'wrong' churches and they should start their own".

== TLC doctrines and teachings ==
Soon after organizing the church, Harmston taught a number of semi-private seminars known as "the Models," discussing the necessity of following early Mormon doctrines. Besides the doctrines of plural marriage and the law of consecration, the TLC also teaches "multiple mortal probations," a form of reincarnation limited in scope to one's own gender and species, i.e., human men are reincarnated as human men and human women as human women. This doctrine is considered false by the LDS Church and some Mormon fundamentalist groups. The TLC also teaches "the gathering," a doctrine familiar to early Mormonism and referenced numerous times in Latter Day Saint scripture. "The gathering" is the idea that all the "elect" of Israel should gather together. To the TLC church, this gathering is thought to be primarily to Manti, but can be elsewhere in Sanpete County, Utah.

Harmston taught he was the reincarnation of Joseph Smith and that he had been ordained by Moses. He predicted a period of upheaval beginning before 2004, and began a survivalist community where he and 300 followers would stay during that period. They would be armed and would have food stored beforehand. Several former sect members sued Harmston, hoping to recover $250,000. Members of the sect were excommunicated by the LDS Church for "undue preoccupation with Armageddon."

While proselytizing was heavily pursued during the infancy of the TLC, all missionary work ceased by March 2000. This was in part due to a revelation and promise by Harmston that Christ would appear on March 25, 2000, perform the ordinance of deliverance, and begin the terrestrial order (or, Millennium). This promise was conditional upon the faithfulness of the members, but when it was not fulfilled, some members felt Harmston had prophesied inaccurately. This precipitated the subsequent apostasy of several members of the First Presidency and Quorum of Twelve Apostles (Randy Maudsley, Jeff Hanks, Kent Braddy, Bart Malstrom and John Harper all either left or were excommunicated). The Quorum of the Twelve and the First Presidency were subsequently reorganized. One of the church's better proselytizing tools, its website, shut down completely a short time later due to a revelation declaring that "the day of the Gentile" had ended, meaning preaching to non-members (gentiles) must cease. A CD-ROM version of the TLC website has continued to be mailed to persons interested in joining the TLC. While the TLC has decided to remain offline in regards to their public missionary work, discussion forums do exist with former members, and cached archives of TLC website material is available on the internet.

The end of "the day of the Gentile" is a reference to previous revelations, particularly in the Doctrine and Covenants, that the gospel of Jesus Christ would first go to the Gentiles and then to the Jews ("the House of Israel"). This policy, in addition to the above factors, discontinued the TLC's policy of open missionary work or attempts at conversion. Those seriously seeking knowledge or membership have been directed at times to attend meetings or research doctrine and other information from the early Latter Day Saint movement.

While the TLC has claimed many early LDS Church doctrines as its own, it has been noted that the TLC itself has changed some of its doctrinal interpretation since its formation. The TLC teaches that only the perception of doctrine has changed, and the actual foundational material remains.

The TLC has a strong youth program heavily involved in Scouting, including the Venturing Scout program which allows participation of both young men and young women.

== Lawsuit ==
In 1998, two disaffected members accused Harmston of fraud when they failed to see Jesus. In 2002, a court awarded them $300,000, but the award was later overturned. An appeals court in 2005 granted the two former members the right to a new trial. The settlement was later reduced to $60,000 due to the church's financial hardship.

== Media coverage ==
A twenty-minute audio documentary, "Saints of the Last Days", aired on National Public Radio's program This American Life in April 1996. It discussed the breakup of the study group that preceded the TLC, which occurred prior to the formal organization of the TLC. The TLC itself was heavily profiled in a 1999 A&E Network documentary, Inside Polygamy (AAE #17685).

A book containing the accounts of two of Harmston's wives (Pauline and Rachel Strong) was published in 2006. Numerous other anti-polygamy books include exposés of the TLC.

A 2007 documentary critical of Mormon fundamentalist groups, Lifting the Veil of Polygamy, included interviews with a former TLC member. In 2010, the anti-polygamy TV program Polygamy: What Love Is This? also aired an interview with a former TLC member.

Some ex-members (including one former member of the First Presidency) have maintained blogs with information about the church.

== Terminology and place within the Latter Day Saint movement ==
The term "Mormon fundamentalist" appears to have been coined in the 1940s by LDS Church apostle Mark E. Petersen. While Mormon fundamentalists, including members of TLC, call themselves "Mormon", the LDS Church considers the designation to apply only to its members and not to members of other sects of the Latter Day Saint movement. The LDS Church therefore claims that there is no such thing as a "Mormon fundamentalist", nor that there are any "Mormon sects". The LDS Church suggests that the correct term to describe these splinter groups is "polygamist sects". The LDS Church has repeatedly emphasized that it is not affiliated with Mormon fundamentalists. If members of the LDS Church are found to be engaging in polygamy, they are excommunicated. The TLC does practice polygamy.

The TLC may also be distinguished from historical Mormon fundamentalism which traces priesthood lineage either through the 1886 Revelation (John W. Woolley line) or those who believe Benjamin F. Johnson's claims (the LeBaron family line). The TLC does teach that the 1886 revelation is legitimate and believes that (as stated in the revelation) John Taylor met with Joseph Smith and Jesus Christ. It has not been made clear how it doctrinally understands the existence of a resurrected Joseph Smith, since James Harmston was believed to be his reincarnation.

The TLC is a re-restorationist movement in that claims the original keys passed down from Joseph Smith, the founder of the Latter Day Saint movement, were lost through apostasy and a re-restoration was necessary.

Some doctrinal distinctions also exist between Mormon fundamentalism and TLC teachings. For example, while the TLC does offer the original endowment Joseph Smith restored, it is understood that a "living endowment"—or administration of keys not all at the same time, but possibly during separate sessions—is necessary for the living, while endowments for the dead are performed in the same manner as the mainstream LDS faith and some other Mormon faiths. The TLC also provides temple ordinances beyond those revealed to Joseph Smith prior to his martyrdom in 1844.

== Other TLC doctrines ==
The TLC shares much doctrinal common ground with other new religious movements, including Edgar Cayce and The Summit Lighthouse.

Harmston gave up clothing with leather or other animal products, suggesting he may have adopted a vegan lifestyle. Whether or not the rest of the membership is living the same is the subject of speculation by some former members. In 2005, the President of the "temporal church" Dan Simmons changed from using sugar to using xylitol.

At one time, the TLC had an "endowment house" in Fairview, Utah, but this was lost when the property owner (a member of the church's First Presidency) left the TLC. They have continued to offer temple ordinances for the living and the dead without the Fairview endowment house, consistent with the threefold mission of the church, which includes "redeem the dead". Historically in Mormonism, ordinances for living people could be performed in endowment houses whereas ordinances for the dead required a temple.

== Death of Harmston ==
Harmston died of a heart attack Thursday, June 27, 2013, at Sanpete Valley Hospital.

== See also ==
- List of Mormon fundamentalist churches
- List of Mormon fundamentalist leaders
