= Edgar C. Whisenant =

American apocalyptist (1932–2001)

Edgar C. Whisenant (September 25, 1932 – May 16, 2001) was an American NASA engineer and Bible student from Little Rock, Arkansas, who predicted the rapture and World War III would occur during Rosh Hashanah in 1988, sometime between September 11 and September 13. Through studying the Bible and using numerology, he gathered 23,000 clues which he used to predict the date. Other information used to predict the end times included "sources as varied as U.S. Defense Department manuals and opinions by radical Rabbi Meir Kahane and pop scientist Carl Sagan." Whisenant believed the description of the sun being blocked out in Revelation chapter 11 was a prediction of nuclear winter.

He initially published two books, 88 Reasons Why the Rapture Will Be in 1988 and On Borrowed Time. Both were published by World Bible Society with financial backing from Norvell Olive, a Christian radio broadcaster. Eventually, 300,000 copies of 88 Reasons were mailed free of charge to ministers across America, and 4.5 million copies were sold in bookstores and elsewhere. On Borrowed Time was said to have reached the hands of 3 million people. 88 Reasons reached number two on the Christian Bookseller Association's list that year. Whisenant's predictions were widely covered – and ridiculed – in the media, including being satirized by humorist Dave Barry.

Whisenant was quoted as saying "Only if the Bible is in error am I wrong; and I say that to every preacher in town" and "[I]f there were a king in this country and I could gamble with my life, I would stake my life on Rosh Hashana 88."

When his predictions failed to materialize, Whisenant claimed the event would still happen that year and initially updated his prediction to October 3. He later stated his calculations were off by one year as he had not factored in the lack of a year zero, which he said gave Christians more time to prepare. He then published The Final Shout, giving a date of September 1, 1989, and later updated his prediction to 1993.

Whisenant's books were met with differing responses. Some believers sold their belongings to prepare for the end times. Other Christians were appreciative that the books could lead to increased prayer and spiritual growth even if untrue; still others referred to the books' theology as "unfortunate and overly literal" or advised against date-setting. One North Carolina man was influenced by the 1988 prediction, and barricading himself in his home, shot at passersby and a police officer.

== Publications ==
- Whisenant, Edgar C. (1988). 88 Reasons Why the Rapture Will Be in 1988. Predicted that the Rapture would occur in 1988.
- Whisenant, Edgar C. (1989). The Final Shout: Rapture Report 1989. Predicted that the Rapture would occur in 1989.
- Whisenant, Edgar C. (1993). 23 Reasons Why a Pre-Tribulation Rapture Looks Like it will Occur on Rosh-Hashanah 1993. Predicted that the Rapture would occur in 1993.
- Whisenant, Edgar C. (1994). And Now the Earth's Destruction by Fire, Nuclear Bomb Fire. Prediction for 1994.

== See also ==
- Unfulfilled Christian religious predictions
- Harold Camping
- 2011 end times prediction
- World War III in popular culture
