= True Russian Orthodox Church =

2007–2008 doomsday cult in Russia

The Penza Recluses (Russian: Пензенские затворники, True Russian Orthodox Church, TROC; Russian: Настоящая русская православная церковь) were an Independent Russian doomsday cult founded by Pyotr Kuznetsov which borrowed some ideas from Eastern Orthodoxy. The self-given name of the group was "Heavenly Jerusalem" (Russian: Горний Иерусалим). The group broke away from the Russian Orthodox Church, considering it "insufficiently" orthodox. Its members were not allowed to eat processed food, watch television nor handle money. They rejected bar codes, social security and other national identification numbers, and passports as they are said to feature satanic imagery and other symbols, such as the "Eye of Providence" and "the number of the Beast".

In November 2007, between 29 and 35 members of the group holed themselves up in a cave in Russia's Penza region, near the village of Nikolskoye, threatening mass suicide by explosion if authorities or community members tried to intervene. Kuznetsov had told them to hide themselves away, to pray and await the end of the world, which he predicted would take place in May 2008. Kuznetsov, himself, was not with the group, as he had been placed under police arrest. Nonetheless, policemen, religious leaders, and various media outlets all camped outside of the cave for nearly six months, in the depths of winter, anxiously waiting to see if any members of the group would eventually give up and leave.

On March 28, 2008, seven women who had been in the cave were treated by emergency workers, regional officials said. Three days later, another 14 members emerged from the cave, after melting snow caused part of the cave’s interior to collapse.

On April 3, 2008, Kuznetsov was taken to a hospital where "Officials said that he may have attempted suicide after realising his prediction had been wrong." In subsequent years, he was in a psychiatric ward, with a diagnosis of paranoia. In 2016, the court again extended the duration of his treatment, per the request of the chief of the regional psychiatric clinic.

On May 16, 2008, the last nine members of the cult emerged from the cave due to toxic fumes produced by decaying corpses; two fellow cult members had died during their stay in the cave. On May 21, after removing the bodies of the deceased, the cave was blown-up. Officially, this was done out of safety concerns, and its potential hazards to the local population and curious visitors. Several cult members would relocate to a deaf village in Belarus.

After their stay in the cave, most of the sect members left Nikolskoye, except for the family of Vitaly Nedogon, with his wife and three children. As of 2012, the Nedogons continued to live without electricity and passports; they still wait and pray to God that the end time's arrival will be imminent.
