= Millennialism =

Belief that a Golden Age or Paradise will occur prior to the final judgment

Millennialism (from Latin mille 'thousand', annus 'year' and -ism) or chiliasm (from the Greek equivalent) is a belief which is held by some religious denominations. According to this belief, a Messianic Age (the so-called Christian Millennium) will be established on Earth prior to the Last Judgment and the future permanent state of eternity.

Christianity and Judaism have both produced messianic movements which featured millennialist teachings—such as the notion that an earthly kingdom of God was at hand. These millenarian movements often led to considerable social unrest.

Similarities to millennialism also exist in Zoroastrianism, which identified successive thousand-year periods, each of which will end in a cataclysm of heresy and destruction, until the final destruction of evil and the final destruction of the spirit of evil by a triumphant king of peace at the end of the final millennial age. Jewish and then Christian interpretations built on Zoroastrianism and on Babylonian astrology, resulting in the construction of a schema of a sequence of seven successive thousand-year periods ("millennia") of earthly human existence.

Scholars have linked various social and political movements, both religious and secular, to millennialist metaphors.

== Christianity ==
Most Christian millennialist thinking is based upon the Book of Revelation, specifically Revelation 20, which describes the vision of an angel who descends from heaven with a large chain and a key to a bottomless pit, and captures Satan, imprisoning him for a thousand years:

He seized the dragon, that ancient serpent, who is the Devil and Satan, and bound him for a thousand years and threw him into the pit and locked and sealed it over him, so that he would deceive the nations no more, until the thousand years were ended. After that, he must be let out for a little while.

— Revelation 20:2–3

The Book of Revelation then describes a series of judges who are seated on thrones, as well as John's vision of the souls of those who were beheaded for their testimony in favor of Jesus and their rejection of the mark of the beast. These souls:

came to life and reigned with Christ a thousand years. (The rest of the dead did not come to life until the thousand years were ended.) This is the first resurrection. Blessed and holy are those who share in the first resurrection. Over these the second death has no power, but they will be priests of God and of Christ, and they will reign with him a thousand years

— Revelation 20:4–6

=== Early church ===
==== Premillennialism ====
During the first centuries after Christ, various forms of chiliasm (millennialism) were to be found in the Church, both East and West. Premillennialism held by the Early Church is called "historic premillennialism", and it was supported in the early church by Papias, Irenaeus, Justin Martyr, Tertullian, Polycarp, Pseudo-Barnabas, Methodius, Lactantius, Commodianus, Theophilus, Melito, Hippolytus of Rome, Victorinus of Pettau, Nepos, Julius Africanus, Tatian and Montanus. However, the premillennial views of Montanus probably affected the later rejection of premillennialism in the Church, as Montanism was seen as a heresy.

==== Amillennialism ====
In the 2nd century, the Alogi (those who rejected all of John's writings) were amillennial, as was Caius in the first quarter of the 3rd century. With the influence of Platonism, Clement of Alexandria and Origen denied premillennialism. Likewise, Dionysius of Alexandria (died 264) argued that Revelation was not written by John and could not be interpreted literally; he was amillennial.

Justin Martyr (died 165), who had chiliastic tendencies in his theology, mentions differing views in his Dialogue with Trypho the Jew, chapter 80:

I and many others are of this opinion [premillennialism], and [believe] that such will take place, as you assuredly are aware; but, on the other hand, I signified to you that many who belong to the pure and pious faith, and are true Christians, think otherwise.

Augustine in his early days affirmed premillennialism, but later changed to amillennialism, causing the view to become popularized together with Pope Gregory the Great.

The Catholic Encyclopedia notes that the 2nd-century proponents of various Gnostic beliefs (themselves considered heresies) also rejected millenarianism.

=== Reformation and beyond ===
Comparison of Christian millennial interpretations

Christian views on the future order of events diversified after the Protestant Reformation (c. 1517). In particular, new emphasis was placed on the passages in the Book of Revelation which seemed to say that as Christ would return to judge the living and the dead, Satan would be locked away for 1000 years, but then released on the world to instigate a final battle against God and his Saints. Previous Catholic and Orthodox theologians had no clear or consensus view on what this actually meant (only the concept of the end of the world coming unexpectedly, "like a thief in the night", and the concept of "the Antichrist" were almost universally held). Millennialist theories try to explain what this "1000 years of Satan bound in chains" would be like.

Various types of millennialism exist with regard to Christian eschatology, especially within Protestantism, such as Premillennialism, Postmillennialism, and Amillennialism. The first two refer to different views of the relationship between the "millennial Kingdom" and Christ's second coming.

Premillennialism sees Christ's second advent as preceding the millennium, thereby separating the Second Coming from the Final Judgment. In this view, "Christ's reign" will be physically on the earth.

Postmillennialism sees Christ's second coming as subsequent to the millennium and concurrent with the final judgment. In this view "Christ's reign" (during the millennium) will be spiritual in and through the church.

Amillennialism sees the 1000 year kingdom as being metaphorically described in Rev. 20:1–6 in which "Christ's reign" is current in and through the church. Thus, while this view does not hold to a future millennial reign, it does hold that the New Heavens and New Earth will appear upon the return of Christ.

=== 19th, 20th, and 21st centuries ===
==== Catholic Church ====
The Catholic Church strongly condemns millennialism as the following shows:

The Antichrist's deception already begins to take shape in the world every time the claim is made to realize within history that messianic hope which can only be realized beyond history through the eschatological judgment. The Church has rejected even modified forms of this falsification of the kingdom to come under the name of millenarianism, especially the "intrinsically perverse" political form of a secular messianism.

— Catechism of the Catholic Church Part 1, Section 2, Article 7, para. 676

==== Bible Student movement ====
The Bible Student movement is a millennialist movement based on views expressed in "The Divine Plan of the Ages", in 1886, in Volume One of the Studies in the Scriptures series, by Pastor Charles Taze Russell. (This series is still being published, since 1927, by the Dawn Bible Students Association.) Bible Students believe that there will be a universal opportunity for every person, past and present, not previously recipients of a heavenly calling, to gain everlasting life on Earth during the Millennium.

==== Jehovah's Witnesses ====
Jehovah's Witnesses believe that Christ will rule from heaven for 1,000 years as king over the earth, assisted by the 144,000 ascended humans. According to them during this 1,000 year reign the earth will become a paradise, like the Garden of Eden, and humans will themselves return to the perfection lost by Adam and Eve.

==== The Church of Almighty God ====
Also known as Eastern Lightning, The Church of Almighty God mentions in its teachings the Age of Millennial Kingdom, which will follow the catastrophes prophesied in the Book of Revelation in the Bible.

==== New Apostolic Reformation ====
Counter to much of the Pentecostal movement, which tends towards belief in premillennialism, the rise of the Antichrist, and the decay of the world prior to the Second Coming, the New Apostolic Reformation's focus is instead on an "optimistic" eschatology. It holds that most end-time prophecies have long since been fulfilled and that modern-day prophets and apostles have divine authority; the end times will be an era in which obedient Christians, through using spiritual warfare and shaping all aspects of society into aligning with their Christian beliefs (Seven Mountain Mandate), will bring about the Second Coming.

==== Alleged partial underpinning of US-Israel attack on Iran 2026 ====
Following the start of the 2026 Iran war, multiple sources reported figures in the United States Army were framing the conflict in millenialist terms. Military Religious Freedom Foundation received anonymous complaints from soldiers claiming they were told the conflict in Iran was meant to cause Armageddon. Another complaint mentioned officers telling soldiers that the conflict was "all part of God’s divine plan", citing the Book of Revelation. According to one NCO, he was told "President Trump has been anointed by Jesus to light the signal fire in Iran to cause Armageddon and mark his return to Earth". In total, the Military Religious Freedom Foundation received more than 200 such complaints, which came from every branch of the military.

== Judaism ==
Millennialist thinking first emerged in Jewish apocryphal literature of the tumultuous Second Temple period. It originated in about 200 B.C.E. and was believed to be fully developed by the year 200 C.E. Many 'signs' that humanity is drawing to a close are mentioned throughout early Jewish texts, including the fact it will be collective, recognizable only on Earth, imminent, and total, completely transforming the human race. This belief was shaped heavily by Norman Cohn, a British historian whose work often focused on principles of Judaism.

Gerschom Scholem profiles medieval and early modern Jewish millennialist teachings in his book Sabbatai Sevi, the mystical messiah, which focuses on the 17th-century movement centered on the self-proclaimed messiahship (1648) of Sabbatai Zevi (1626–1676)

== Islam ==
According to a hadith, the Prophet Muhammad has stated that a man from his Household will come and rid the world of all injustice and tyranny. He will be known as the Mahdi.

The Mahdi is noted in the Sunni books, Sunan Abi Dawud 4285, Sunan Ibn Majah 4083, and Sahih Muslim 2913. Muslims, who believe in hadith, also believe that Jesus will come alongside the Mahdi and will fight together with him against oppression and injustice, where the Mahdi will rule for a period of time before the Day of Judgement.

Shia and Sunni Muslims differ on who exactly the Mahdi is. While they both agree that he will come alongside Jesus to save mankind from injustice and oppression; Sunnis believe he is yet to be born, while Shias believe that he is currently alive and in occultation.

== Baha'i Faith ==
Bahá'u'lláh mentioned in the Kitáb-i-Íqán that God will renew the "City of God" about every thousand years, and specifically mentioned that a new Manifestation of God would not appear within 1,000 years (1852–2852 CE) of Bahá'u'lláh's Dispensation, but that the authority of Bahá'u'lláh's message could last up to 500,000 years.

Further reading: William P. Collins (2025). Millennialism, Millerites, and Prophecy in Bahá’í Discourse. Routledge.

== Theosophy ==
The Theosophist Alice Bailey taught that The Christ or The World Teacher would return "sometime after AD 2025", and that this would be the New Age equivalent of the Christian concept of the Second Coming of Christ. Note that the being she speaks of as The World Teacher is the same as that spiritual being best known to other Theosophists as Maitreya.

== Social movements ==
Millennial social movements, a specific form of millenarianism, have as their basis some concept of a cycle of one-thousand years. Sometimes the two terms are used as synonyms, but purists regard this as not entirely accurate. Millennial social movements need not have a religious foundation, but they must have a vision of an apocalypse that can be utopian or dystopian. Those associated with millennial social movements are "prone to [be violent]", with certain types of millennialism connected to violence.

In progressive millennialism, the "transformation of the social order is gradual and humans play a role in fostering that transformation".

Catastrophic millennialism "deems the current social order as irrevocably corrupt, and total destruction of this order is necessary as the precursor to the building of a new, godly order".

However, the link between millennialism and violence may be problematic, as new religious movements may stray from the catastrophic view as time progresses.

=== Nazism ===
The most controversial interpretation of the three-age system and of millennialism in general involves Adolf Hitler's "Third Reich" (Drittes Reich), which in his vision would last for a thousand years to come (Tausendjähriges Reich) but ultimately lasted for only 12 years (1933–1945).

The German thinker Arthur Moeller van den Bruck coined the phrase "Third Reich" and in 1923 published a book titled Das Dritte Reich. Looking back at German history, he distinguished two separate periods, and identified them with the ages of the 12th-century Italian theologian Joachim of Fiore:

- the Holy Roman Empire (beginning with Charlemagne in AD 800): the "First Reich", The Age of the Father and
- the German Empire, under the House of Hohenzollern (1871–1918): the "Second Reich", The Age of the Son.

After the interval of the Weimar Republic (1918 onwards), during which constitutionalism, parliamentarianism and even pacifism dominated, these were then to be followed by:

- the "Third Reich", The Age of the Holy Spirit.

Although van den Bruck was unimpressed by Hitler when he met him in 1922 and did not join the Nazi Party, nevertheless the Nazis adopted the term "Third Reich" to label the totalitarian state they wanted to set up when they gained power, which they succeeded in doing in 1933. Later, however, the Nazi authorities banned the informal use of "Third Reich" throughout the German press in the summer of 1939, instructing it to use more official terms such as "German Reich", "Greater German Reich", and "National Socialist Germany" exclusively.

During the early part of the Third Reich many Germans also referred to Hitler as being the German Messiah, especially when he conducted the Nuremberg rallies, which came to be held annually (1933–1938) at a date somewhat before the September equinox in Nuremberg.

In a speech held on 27 November 1937, Hitler commented on his plans to have major parts of Berlin torn down and rebuilt:

[...] einem tausendjährigen Volk mit tausendjähriger geschichtlicher und kultureller Vergangenheit für die vor ihm liegende unabsehbare Zukunft eine ebenbürtige tausendjährige Stadt zu bauen [...].

[...] to build a millennial city adequate [in splendour] to a thousand-year-old people with a thousand-year-old historical and cultural past, for its never-ending [glorious] future [...]

After Adolf Hitler's unsuccessful attempt to implement a thousand-year reign, the Vatican issued an official statement that millennial claims could not be safely taught and that the related scriptures in Revelation (also called the Apocalypse) should be understood spiritually. Catholic author Bernard LeFrois wrote:

Millenium [sic]: [...] Since the Holy Office decreed (July 21, 1944) that it cannot be safely taught that Christ at His Second Coming will reign visibly with only some of His saints (risen from the dead) for a period of time before the final and universal judgment, a spiritual millennium is to be seen in Apoc. 20:4–6. St. John gives a recapitulation of the activity of Satan, and the spiritual reign of the saints with Christ in heaven and in His Church on earth.

—

=== Utopianism ===
The early Christian concepts of millennialism had ramifications far beyond strictly religious concerns during the centuries to come, as various theorists blended and enhanced them with ideas of utopia.

In the wake of early millennial thinking, the Three Ages philosophy developed. The Italian monk and theologian Joachim of Fiore (died 1202) saw all of human history as a succession of three ages:

1. the Age of the Father (the Old Testament)
2. the Age of the Son (the New Testament)
3. the Age of the Holy Spirit (the age begun when Christ ascended into heaven, leaving the Paraclete, the third person of the Holy Trinity, to guide the faithful)

It was believed that the Age of the Holy Spirit would begin at c. 1260, and that from then on all believers would live as monks, mystically transfigured and full of praise for God, for a thousand years until Judgment Day would put an end to the history of our planet.

Joachim of Fiore's divisions of historical time also highly influenced the New Age movement, which transformed the Three Ages philosophy into astrological terminology, relating the Northern-hemisphere vernal equinox to different constellations of the zodiac. In this scenario the Age of the Father was recast as the Age of Aries, the Age of the Son became the Age of Pisces, and the Age of the Holy Spirit was called the Aquarian New Age. The current so-called "Age of Aquarius" will supposedly witness the development of a number of great changes for humankind, reflecting the typical features of some manifestations of millennialism.

== See also ==
- Christian eschatology
- Christian Zionism
- Council of Ephesus
- Cult of the Holy Spirit
- Immanentize the eschaton
- Millenarianism
- Millennial Day Theory
- New religious movement
- Preterism
- The Pursuit of the Millennium
- Year 1000
- Year 6000

== Bibliography ==
- Barkun, Michael. Disaster and the Millennium (Yale University Press, 1974) (ISBN 0-300-01725-1)
- Case, Shirley J. The Millennial Hope, The University of Chicago Press, 1918.
- Cohn, Norman. The Pursuit of the Millennium: Revolutionary Millenarians and Mystical Anarchists of the Middle Ages, (2nd ed. Yale University Press, 1970).
- Desroches, Henri, Dieux d'hommes. Dictionnaire des messianismes et millénarismes de l'ère chrétienne, The Hague: Mouton, 1969,
- Ellwood, Robert. "Nazism as a Millennialist Movement", in Catherine Wessinger (ed.), Millennialism, Persecution, and Violence: Historical Cases (Syracuse University Press, 2000). (ISBN 0-8156-2809-9 or ISBN 0-8156-0599-4)
- Fenn, Richard K. The End of Time: Religion, Ritual, and the Forging of the Soul (Pilgrim Press, 1997). (ISBN 0-8298-1206-7 or ISBN 0-281-04994-7)
- Hall, John R. Apocalypse: From Antiquity to the Empire of Modernity, (Cambridge, UK: Polity 2009). (ISBN 978-0-7456-4509-4 [pb] and ISBN 978-0-7456-4508-7)
- Kaplan, Jeffrey (1997). Radical Religion in America: Millenarian Movements from the Far Right to the Children of Noah. Syracuse University Press. ISBN 978-0-8156-0396-2.
- Landes, Richard. Heaven on Earth: The Varieties of the Millennial Experience, (Oxford University Press 2011)
- Pasquier, Cyril. Approches du millénium: Et si Irénée de Lyon avait raison?, (Münster, Aschendorff Verlag, Studia Oecumenica Friburgensia 103, 2021, 807 p.). (ISBN 978-3-402-12237-2)
- Pentecost, J. Dwight. Things to Come: A study in Biblical Eschatology (Zondervan, 1958) ISBN 0-310-30890-9 and ISBN 978-0-310-30890-4.
- Redles, David. Hitler's Millennial Reich: Apocalyptic Belief and the Search for Salvation (New York University Press, 2005). (ISBN 978-0-8147-7621-6 or ISBN 978-0-8147-7524-0)
- Stone, Jon R., ed. Expecting Armageddon: Essential Readings in Failed Prophecy (Routledge, 2000). (ISBN 0-415-92331-X)
- Underwood, Grant. (1999) [1993]. The Millenarian World of Early Mormonism. Urbana: University of Illinois Press. ISBN 978-0252068263
- Wessinger, Catherine. ed. The Oxford Handbook of Millennialism (Oxford University Press, 2011) 768 pp. ISBN 978-0-19-530105-2 online review
- Wistrich, Robert. Hitler's Apocalypse: Jews and the Nazi Legacy (St. Martin's Press, 1985). (ISBN 0-312-38819-5)
- Wojcik, Daniel (1997). The End of the World as We Know It: Faith, Fatalism, and Apocalypse in America. New York University Press. ISBN 0-8147-9283-9.
