= Cult of the Holy Spirit =

Catholic sub-culture

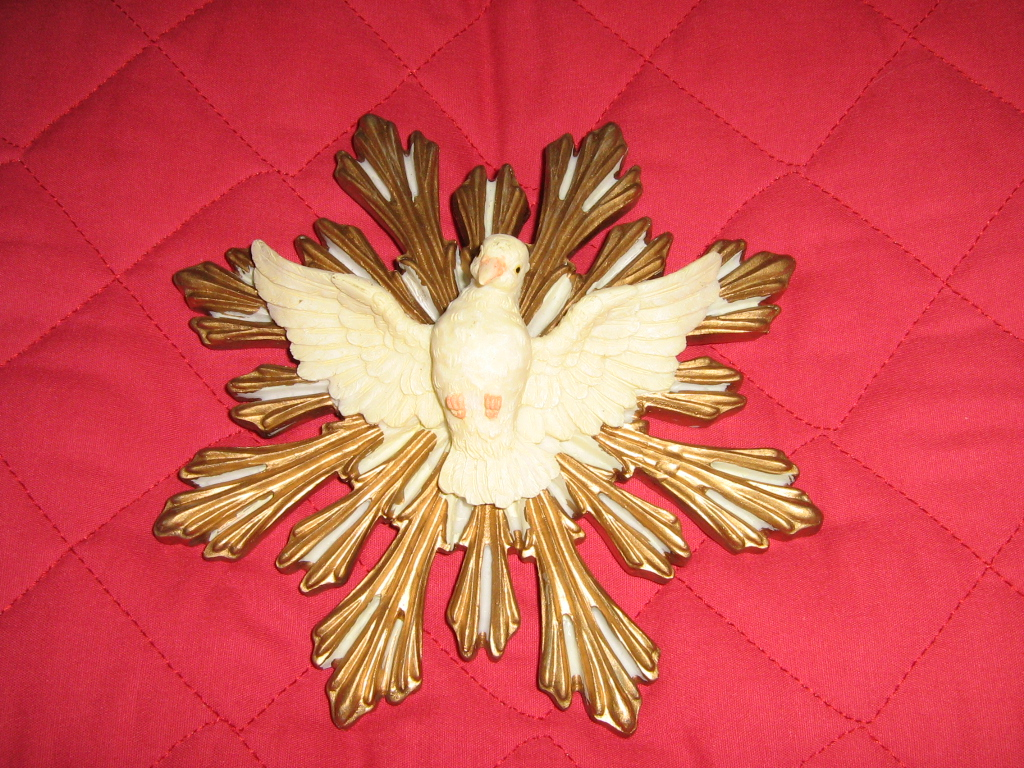
A symbol of the faith: the dove of the Holy Spirit, as seen on one of the standards carried in ritual processions

The Cult of the Holy Spirit (Portuguese: Culto do Divino Espírito Santo), also known as the Cult of the Empire of the Holy Spirit (Culto do Império do Divino Espírito Santo), is a religious sub-culture, inspired by Christian millenarian mystics, associated with Azorean Catholic identity, consisting of iconography, architecture, and religious practices that have continued in many communities of the archipelago as well as the broader Portuguese diaspora. Beyond the Azores, the Cult of the Holy Spirit is alive in parts of Brazil (where it was established three centuries ago) and pockets of Portuguese settlers in North America. The Cult of the Holy Spirit involves traditional rituals and religious celebrations of these faith communities.

In its original sense, "cult" referred to an accepted religious practice, in sharp contrast to the term's modern, negative connotation. Devotion to the Holy Spirit is part of classical Catholic dogma and is the inspiration of several Catholic religious institutes, including the Spiritans, but what is considered here has peculiar characteristics of its own.

== History ==
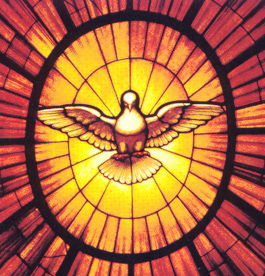
The dove: iconographic symbol of the Holy Spirit

=== Joachimites ===
Worship of the Holy Spirit was inspired by the figure of Joachim of Fiore (†1202), a medieval monk who was considered as a millenarian prophet who, on the basis on his interpretation of the Book of Revelation, postulated that around the year 1260 a Third Age of history would begin. The Third Age would be governed by the Holy Spirit and would represent a spiritual governance, in which Orthodox Christians and the Jews would re-unite with the Catholics in one faith. These theories became associated with the Fraticelli strand of the Franciscan Order, and were later condemned by Pope Alexander IV in 1256, after the so-called scandal of the Eternal Evangel caused by Gerardo of Borgo San Donnino.

=== Cult ===
Two hundred years later, there was a rebirth of the popularity of these doctrines in the Azores; their religious manifestations, rituals and symbols began to permeate the islands and, consequently, persist until today. These acts of faith were heavily influenced by Franciscan spiritualists, who were members of the first religious order that colonized the Azores, and brought with them traditions that were being extinguished on the mainland by Catholic Church orthodoxy. Here, in isolated communities under environmental pressures and the uncertainties of life, the millenarian rites of the Holy Spirit were accepted and fostered. The Azores, and those communities that had their origins in the archipelago, became the last outposts of Joachimite doctrines.

The origins of the modern cult and its rituals are not definitively understood. The dominant theory postulates that the celebrations were introduced into Portugal by Queen Elizabeth of Portugal. The cult's principal centre of devotion was in Tomar, which was also the location of the priory of the Order of Christ, charged with the spirituality of newly discovered lands (including the Azores). Another centre was Alenquer, where, in the first years of the 14th century, Queen Elizabeth introduced the first celebration of the Império do Divino Espírito Santo (English: Empire of the Divine Holy Spirit), probably influenced by Franciscan spiritualists, who there founded the first Franciscan Convent in Portugal. From there the cult first spread in Portugal (Aldeia Galega, Alenquer, Sintra, Tomar, Lisbon), and later accompanied the Portuguese during their Atlantic discoveries.

The new colonies were, in the beginning, subordinate to the priory in Tomar, later the archbishop of Funchal, and finally, the new bishopric of Angra do Heroísmo, which were overseen by the Order of Christ, who nominated new clerics, oriented the faithful and supervised the religious development. In this context, references to the proliferation of the cult of the Holy Spirit appeared early, and in a general way, throughout the archipelago. Gaspar Frutuoso, writing 150 years after the beginning of the island's settlement, indicated that this devotion existed in all the islands; its expansion was tolerated, if not promoted, by the Order of Christ. References in the Constituições Sinodais da Diocese de Angra (approved in 1559) by the Bishop of Angra, Friar Jorge de Santiago show that some attention was given to the cults by the episcopal authorities.

The existence of the Irmandades do Divino Espírito Santo (English: Brotherhoods of the Divine Holy Spirit) were first noted in the 16th century. The first hospital constructed in the Azores (1498), under the Santa Casa da Misericórdia of Angra, received its current name, the Hospital do Santo Espírito. The distribution of food (meats, bread, milk) was already an important part of the charity common in the middle of the 16th century.

From then on, and in particular after the beginning of the 18th century, the cult of the Holy Spirit assumed a position of importance in Azorean culture, becoming a unifier of the population in the various islands. With Azorean emigration, the cult was transplanted to Brazil, where by the end of the 18th century there existed feast days in Rio de Janeiro, in Bahia, and other zones where Azorean immigrants settled, such as Santa Catarina, Rio Grande do Sul and Pernambuco. In the 19th century, the traditions spread to Massachusetts, Rhode Island, Hawaii, Connecticut and California in the United States, as well as to Ontario, Quebec, and British Columbia in Canada.

The Feast of the Empire of the Divine Holy Spirit was also celebrated on board of the naus on their way to Brazil and to India, during the 16th century. In a letter sent to Italy from Goa (India), the Jesuit missionary Fulvio Gregori reports: "The Portuguese used to elect an Emperor by the Feast of Pentecost and it was so also in this ship St. Francisco. Indeed, they chose a boy as Emperor on the eve of Pentecost, in the midst of great pomp. They dressed him very richly and then put on his head the imperial crown. They also chose for him lords and officers at orders, so that the captain was appointed overseer over his house, another gentleman was appointed cupbearer, each with his office at the disposal of the Emperor. Even the officers of the ship joined in, the master, the pilot, etc. Then, on the day of Pentecost (Easter or Holy Spirit), all dressed to perfection, at an altar on the bow of the ship, where there was more space, with beautiful cloths and silverware, they led the Emperor to Mass, with music, drums and courtiers. There he was seated on a chair with velvet cushions, with a crown on his head and a sceptre in his hand, surrounded by his court, to the accompaniment of artillery salvos. The courtiers of the Emperor feasted and then, finally, served everyone here on board, around three hundred people."

=== Spiritual tenets ===
Generally, there are several prescribed tenets that organize this religious movement, that were derived from Joachimite dogma:

- Hope (Portuguese: esperança) — the faithful seek the fulfillment of religious dogma that assumes a period of human spiritual development and brotherhood, and in which the Holy Spirit is the fountain of knowledge and order;
- Faith in the Divine (Portuguese: Fé no Divino) — that the Holy Spirit is present in all places, it knows all and sees all, and the faithful recognize that there are no secrets from the Holy Spirit. Offenses are severely punitive; O Divino Espírito Santo é vingativo (English: The Holy Spirit is vengeful), and holy vows/promises to God should be kept. Seven spiritual virtues guide the brotherhood of the faithful: wisdom, understanding, counsel, fortitude, knowledge, piety, and fear of the Lord.
- Egalitarianism — all brothers are equal, and all can be mordomos (English: leader of the brotherhood), and all may be crowned in their ritualized functions as the emperor (imperador), receiving equal respect and obedience when invested with this authority: it is the practical application of the Joachimite principles.
- Solidarity and Charity — in the distribution of alms (meat, soup and milk traditionally), the poor are privileged recipients who equally take part in the celebrations, while all offenses are pardoned in order to receive the Holy Spirit.
- Autonomy from the Church; the cult of the Holy Spirit is not dependent on the formal organization of the Church, nor are the clergy needed to participate in the practices; there are no intermediaries between the devotees and the Divine. Over time, in practice, this tenet of Joachimite spirituality has become more obscure, as the Church plays a role in blessing the events (through processions to the local church and masses held auspiciously for the feast)

== Impérios ==
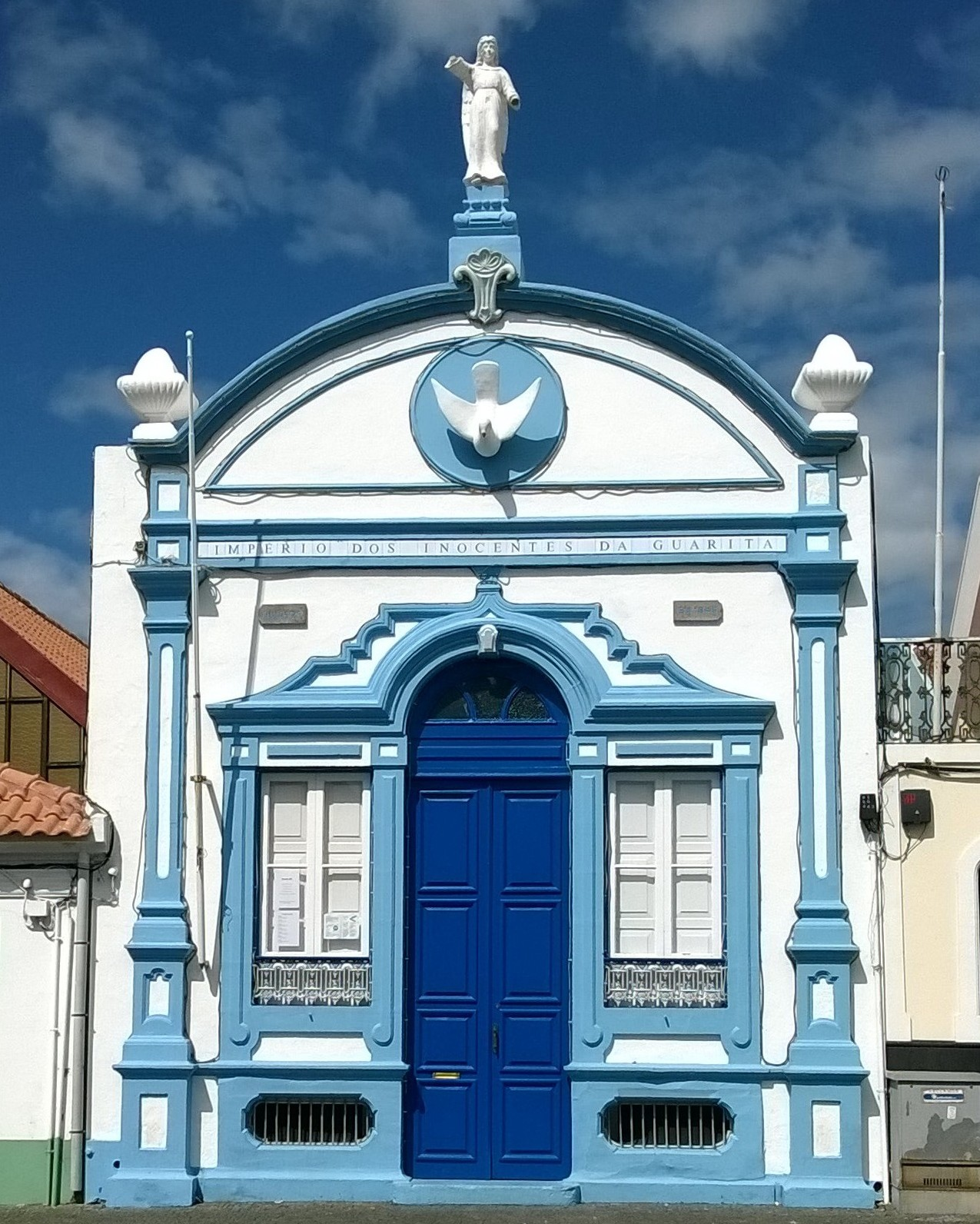
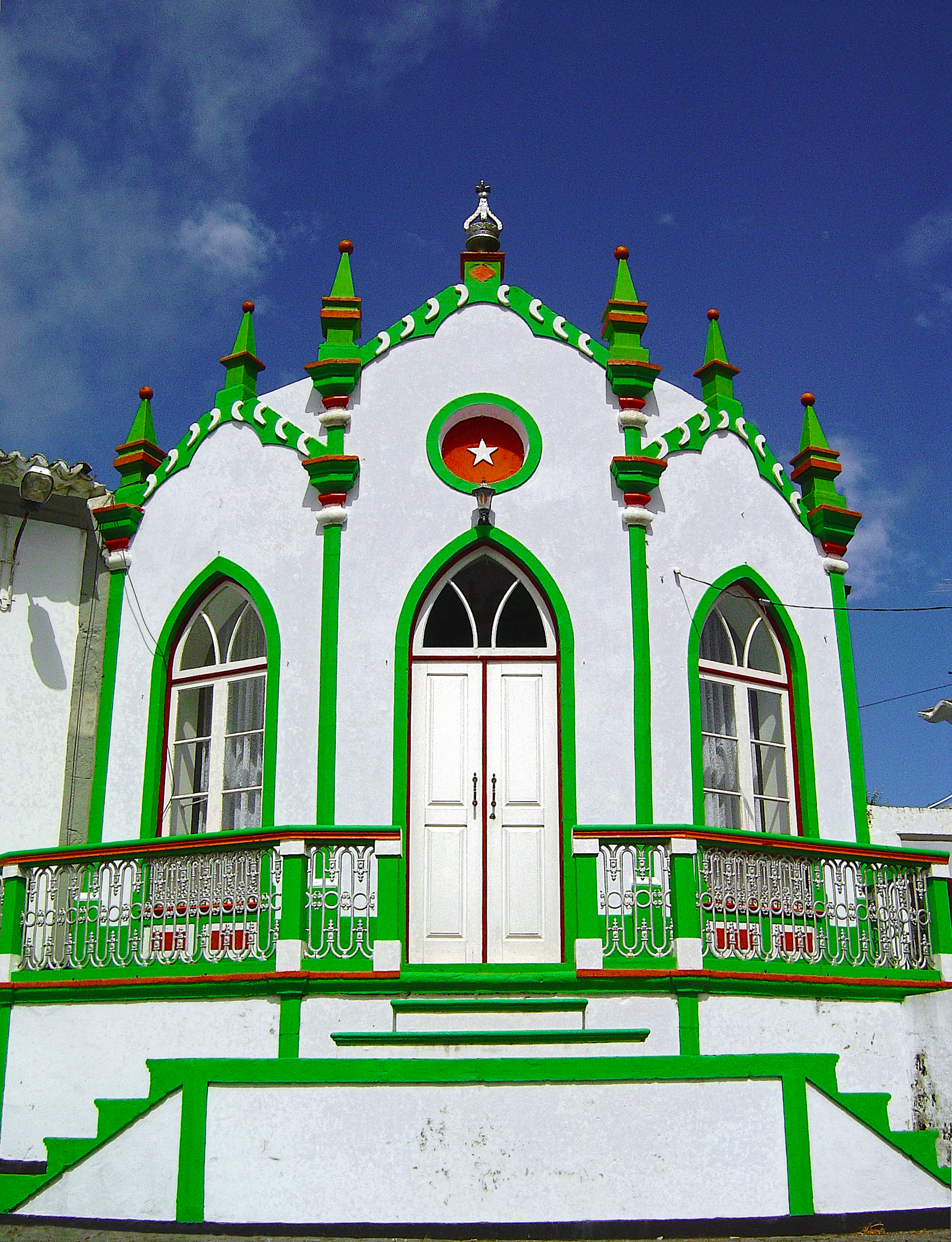
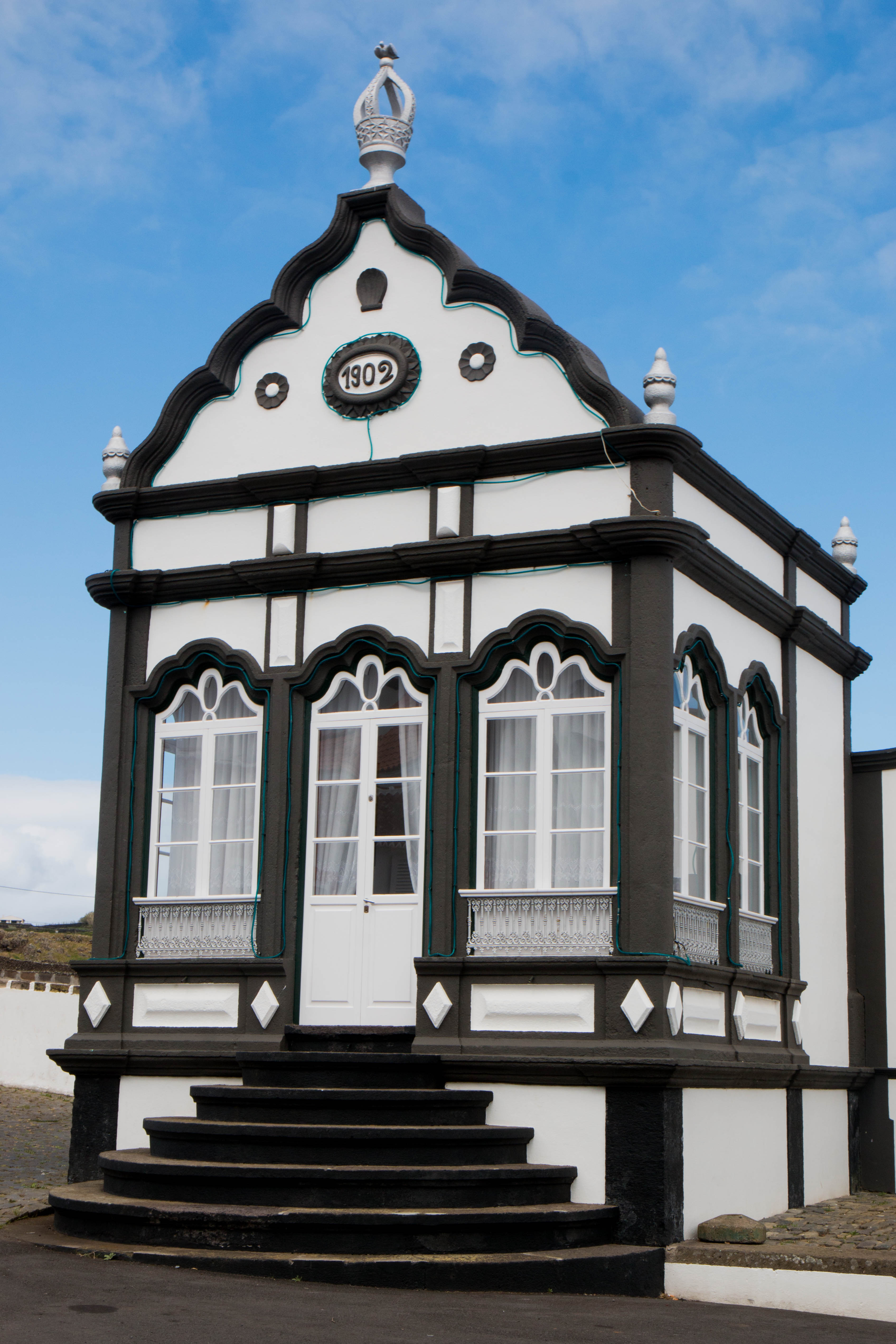
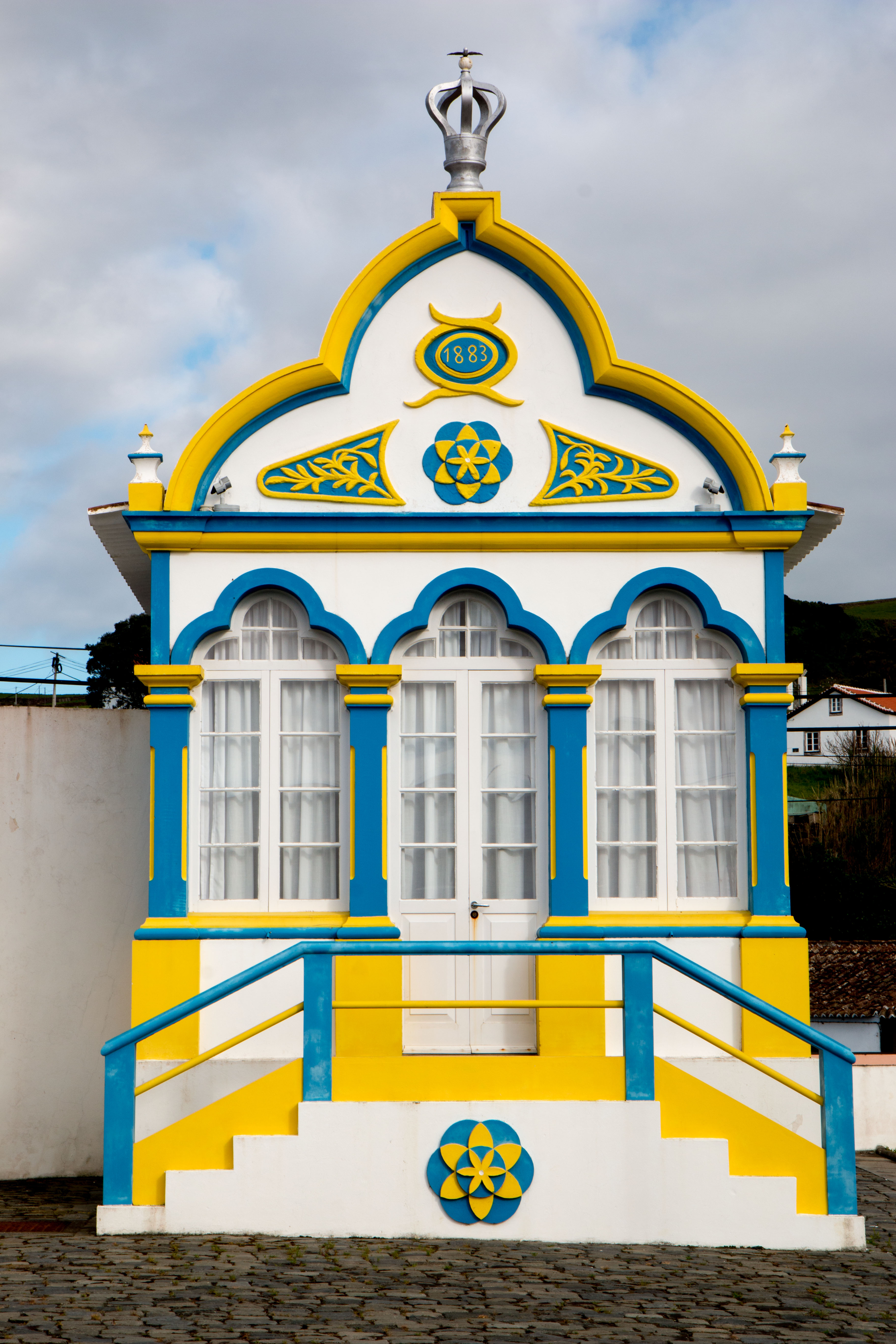
Impérios of the Cult of the Holy Spirit, found throughout the Azores.

The organization of the cult, with some variation between the islands, and between the Azorean diaspora includes the following structures:

=== Irmandade ===
The Irmandade (English: Brotherhood) is the organizational nucleus of the cult, comprising the brothers, voluntarily registered (and accepted) and who are all equal in rights and responsibilities. Although they have historically been exclusively masculine, both women and men are accepted, as are members of different origins or titles. This rule was rarely violated, although on some islands there did exist Impérios dos nobres, which only accepted brothers from the local aristocracy. Each irmandade is a territorial unit, constituted as local associations of neighbours, grouping families and residents from within a particular parish or locality. These groups have defined compromises, based on consensual rules that are not written, but recognized by the members. In cases where the diocese or authorities have attempted to impose or intervene in the businesses of these groups, there has generally been passive resistance and indignation from its members.

=== Império ===
Each irmandade is organized around the Império do Divino Espírito Santo, normally a small structure, with a distinct architectural style where the faithful conduct their rituals. The architecture of the Impérios varies from island to island; from simple tile-roofed buildings (such as in Santa Maria) to grande chapels with ornate facades and crowned with an imperial crown (in Terceira). It is used as a place to store the reliquaries, pennants, symbols; to cook and/or distribute the offerings; and to perform some of the religious services associated with the event. The appearance of permanent impérios began in the last half of the 19th century, probably resulting from money remitted from emigrants in the Brazilian and/or Californian diaspora. Until this point, the cult would realize their services in treatros, structures constructed principally for the events, that were later torn down. The Azorean diaspora, particularly those from New England and Canada, in addition to small structures, would construct larger enclosed salons owing to the conditions in these environments.

=== Mordomo ===
During each celebration, one member of the irmandade would receive the designation of mordomo, which was normally made by drawing straws or name selection from a hat, usually by a young child. Many irmandades admit that voluntarism is common, when one of the brothers will make an offering or promessa (English: promise) to the Holy Spirit, necessitating an act of benevolence and charity. The mordomo is responsible for coordinating the collection of funds for the feast, the organization of the event, the peoples invited, the purchase of meat, bread, wine, etc. and generally seen as the supreme authority of the brothers during the event.

== Symbols ==
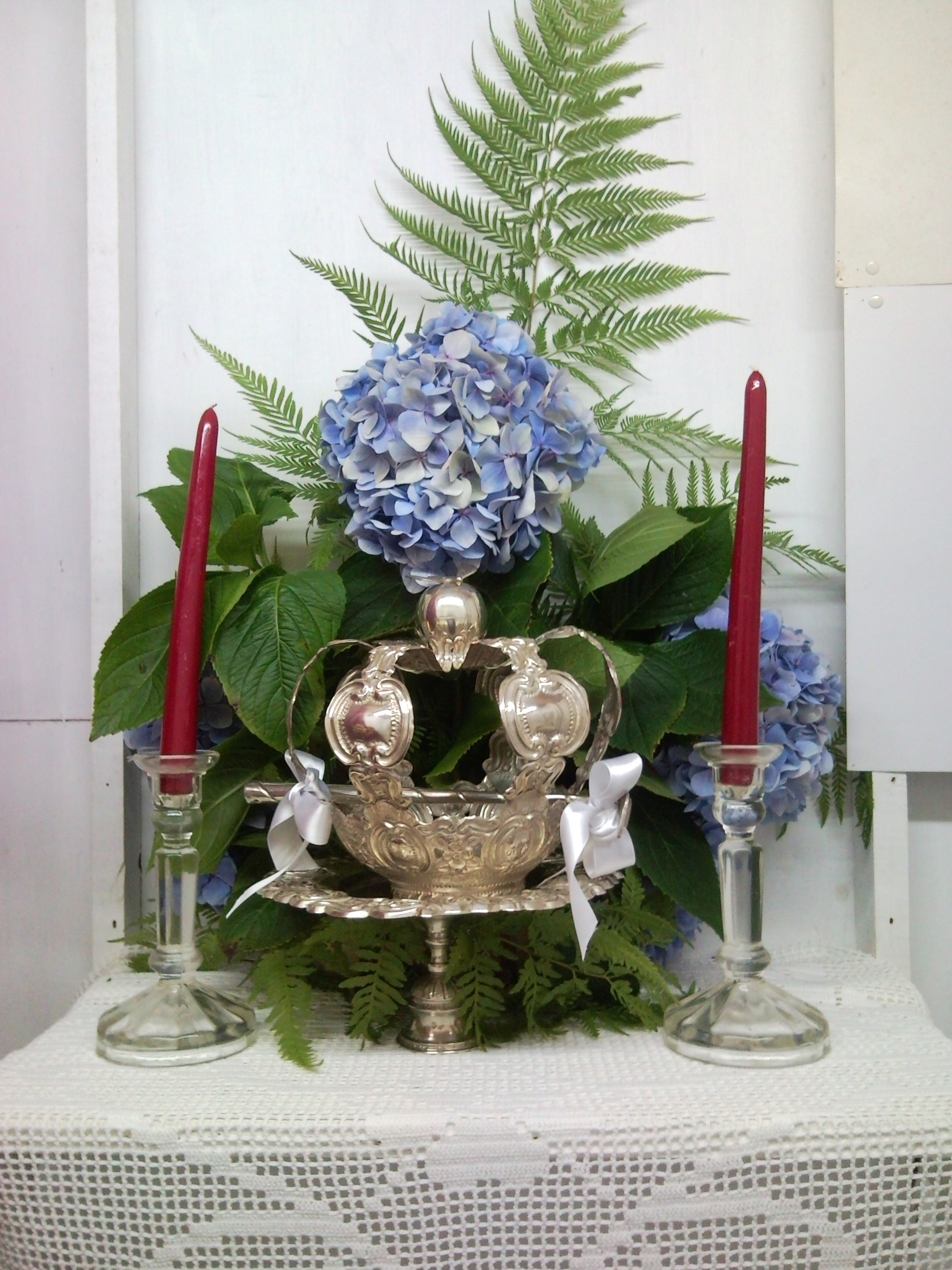
An altar in honor of the Holy Spirit with Crown, an example from the island of São Jorge

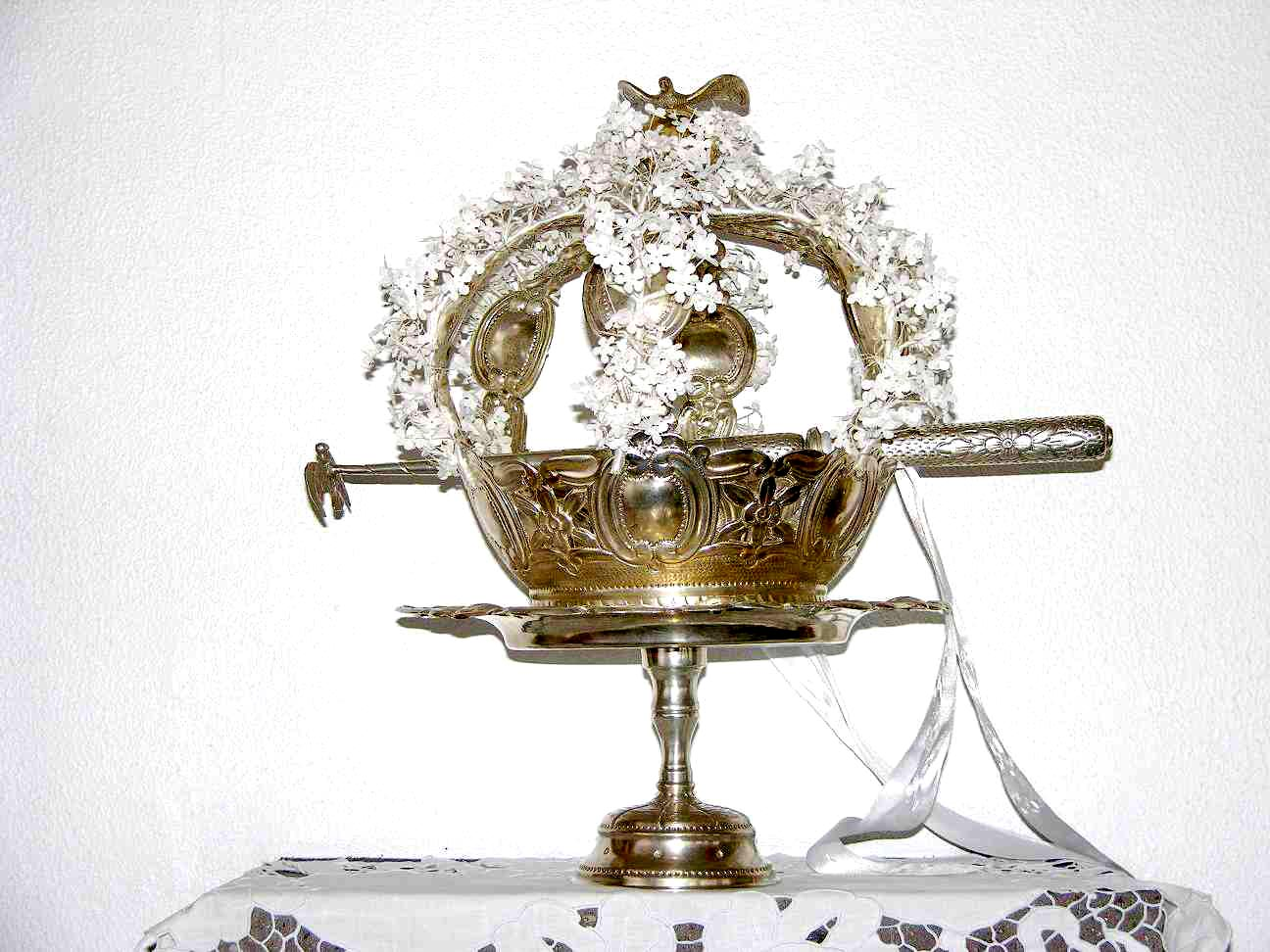
Crown, scepter and orb of the Holy Spirit

The rituals of the cult include various symbolic objects that are typically incorporated during the ceremonies; they include:

- Crown, scepter and orb — these are most important symbols of the Império, and assumes a central place during the celebrations. The crown is an imperial design, in silver, normally with four arms that meet at a golden orb (also in silver) surmounted by the dove of the Holy Spirit. Each crown comes with a silver scepter, again, surmounted with the dove of the Holy Spirit. In addition, the crown and scepters are decorated with ribbons of white, and mounted on a silver plate with a tall rest. The size of the crown varies, and in general, each irmandade may have one large and two smaller crowns, used to represent the Império of the Holy Spirit. In addition to being used in crowning ceremonies, it is considered an honor to transport the crown or let it remain in your home, which occurs with the brotherhood routinely. Throughout the years, the crown will circulate, remaining in a place of honor in the household, where nightly prayers would occur. Although, traditionally, the process of moving the crowns from household to household involved a cortege, escorted by the brotherhood, in modern times, the movement is not as ornamented.
- Flag — the pennant, of brilliant red color, is a double-side quadrangular dimension (five palms on the side), knitted with a relief of the white dove of the Holy Spirit and rays of gold and white radiating from its center. The flagstaff, made of wood, is two meters in height (although some are smaller or taller) surmounted with the dove of the Holy Spirit in tin or silver. The flag will accompany the crown and is always present in the liturgical ceremonies and crowning; it is an honor to be selected to carry the flag during the ceremonial cortege. A smaller flag is usually raised near the location of the crown, wherever it stays, and it is common to see white flags line the squares during the ceremonies.
- Hymn — the Hino do Espírito Santo (English: Hymn of the Holy Spirit), composed at the end of the 19th century, is used by the bands and sung during the crowning ceremonies. Although primarily used in these ceremonies, some of its chords have been inserted into the Hymn of the Azores (the regional national anthem).
- Mace and ribbon — inspired by the ceremonial maces carried traditionally by municipal judges or officials, the ceremony and cortège is accompanied by a variable number of mace-bearers (but usually 12). The wooded maces, usually 1.5 meters in length, sometimes include a base for a candle, or surmounted with a tin or silver dove. During the cortège the mace-bearers surround the crown-bearer, in some cases the maces are joined together to form a rectangle, and the crown-bearer walks within the space. In some irmandades an extra mace (sometimes painted in white) will be provided to an individual who will be responsible for maintaining the procession in good order. It is occasionally, referred colloquially as the "enxota porcos" (English: pig incentive), likely a reference to a time when animals roamed the streets, and had to be forced to the side of the road. The organization would normally select people who needed a position of honor: mostly young people.
- Foliões do Divino — a small group of about five musicians that sing hymns, accompanied by drum, cymbal, and tambourine, who visit the homes of the brotherhood. They are also included in the transference of the crown, at the collection of donations, during the procession, the rituals and the distribution of offerings. On the island of Santa Maria as well as the area of Beira on São Jorge, the foliões are part of more complex rituals that have disappeared from other islands, involving the liturgy of the Holy Spirit.

== Rituals ==
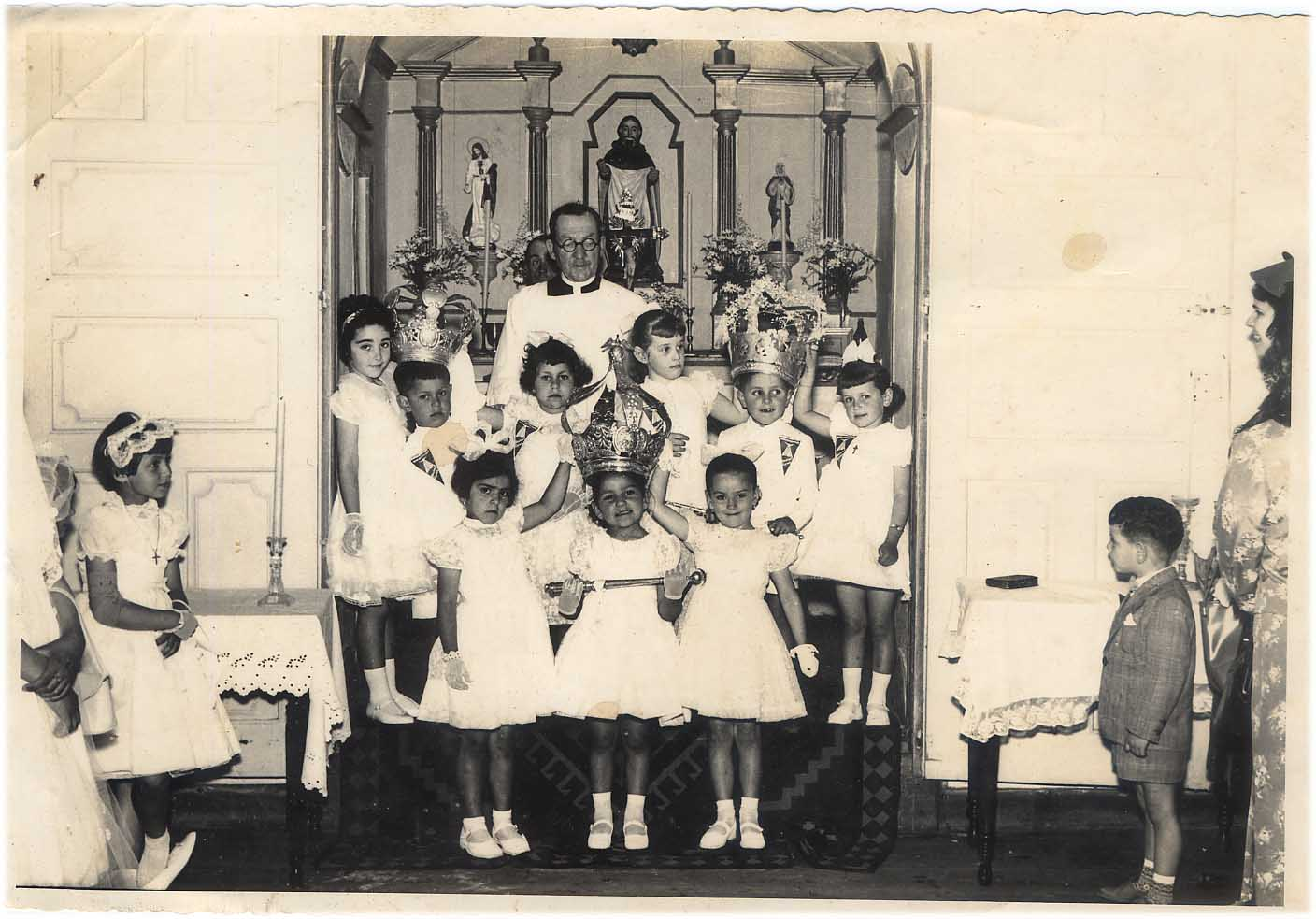
A coronation ceremony in the first half of the 20th century

=== Procession ===
Also, referred to as the cortège, império or mudança (English: the move); on Easter day, the crowns are transported to the church, where they are placed on the altar, until the end, when they ceremonially crown the recipient (coronation). The emperor will then depart for his home, accompanied by his cortège and the brotherhood, and led by the Holy Spirit's standard, the foliões, the crowns surrounded by the poles (in a rectangular form) and trailed by the faithful. Normally, a band will follow the cortège with cheerful processional music, although they may be accompanied alone by the Foliões of the Divino. Upon arriving at the emperor's home, the crowns are placed on an altar of honour of wood and adorned with white paper and flowers, to remain throughout the week. Every evening the neighbours and faith community gather at the home where traditionally some food and dancing may have occurred, but usually ends with the recitation of the rosary and benedictions to the Holy Spirit. On the following Sunday, the crowns depart once again with the cortège for the church, where they are received by the local parish priest, who recites the Magnificat (a traditional pastoral benediction). The process, traditionally, repeats itself until the seventh Sunday following Easter (referred to as the Domingo do Bodo), and in some cases until the eighth Sunday following Easter (traditionally referred to as the Segundo Bodo or Domingo da Trindade). The modern tradition, influenced by religious immigrants, is shortened to include a brief cortège procession (usually on the same day of the coronation), and ceremonial transfers of the crown to the home of the emperor, all performed throughout the summer.

=== Coronation ===
The coronation (Portuguese: coroação) concludes the principal religious ceremonies and involves the placement of the silver crown on the head of the emperor, or persons destined to hold it in the ceremony, by the parish priest. Similarly, after ritually kissing the dove on the silver sceptre, the faithful are empowered to rise with the crowns while benedictions are made in the name of the Holy Spirit, while the hymn is played. Immediately following this ceremony, the cortege is reformed and proceeds to exit the church, with the priest singing the Magnificat once again.

=== Bodo ===
Traditionally, on the seventh Sunday following Easter (Pentecost Sunday) the faithful realize the bodo. On this day, the cortège, after leaving the church travel to the império, where the Holy Spirit's standard and the crowns are placed in exhibition. In front of the império, on long bunks, are placed offerings or esmolas that, after being blessed, are distributed to the gathered. The brotherhood receive the people and invite them to freely partake of bread and wine, while meat, sugar pastries and massa sovada (traditional Portuguese sweet bread) are offered to the participants, organized by the mordomo. At the end of the Bodo, the crowns are collected and the cortege ferries them to the home of the mordomo. The Monday following this seventh Sunday of Easter, is Azores Day, or as it is traditionally known, the Dia da Pombinha (English: Day of the Dove).

==== Esmola ====
The esmola or pensão (English: charitable offering) is constituted by a portion of beef cattle (specifically killed for the event), bread and vinho de cheiro (a high alcohol content wine derived from the Isabel caste grapes). It is distributed to the brotherhood, as well as the families in most need.

=== Função ===
The function, is the gathering of neighbors, family and friends for a ritualized meal that includes invited guests of the principal who took on a promise to the Holy Spirit. The meal consists of the Holy Spirit Soup, a meat broth that is applied to buttered bread and tempered with mint leaves, either accompanied with the cooked meat used in its preparation, Portuguese sweet bread and sweet rice puree sprinkled with cinnamon. There are many variations on the meat broth recipe that includes the methods of preparing the soup, the availability of side dishes or the consistency of the soup. On the island of Terceira, for example, the Holy Spirit Soup is accompanied by an alcatra, a plate of meat cooked in red wine in an earthen pot. The function symbolizes community sharing, and occurs in the presence of the crowns and flag, accompanied by hymns to the Holy Spirit, normally led by the Foliões.

Today, these functions are also held outside the normal religious context, on the Day of the Azores, during protocol receptions or more recently as tourist inspired events to promote the culture of the Azores (and uncommonly open to the public). The largest function recorded, occurred on 10 June 2000, when 8000 participants gathered on the Rua de São Pedro, in Angra do Heroísmo, in the presence of the President of the Portuguese Republic, the Prime Minister and President of the Regional Government, as well as the accredited members of the Portuguese diplomatic corps and other invited dignitaries.

==== Briança ====
As part of the rituals leading-up to the function, a cortege will also proceed through the community with a cow (which will later be slaughtered for the feast), decorated with colourful paper flowers and accompanied by the foliões. This secondary cortege, proceeding the events of the coronation and bodo, stops at the door of each family who contributes money, while hymns and chants are made, and the traditional briança music played.

==== Ceia ====
The ceia dos criadores is a dinner organized in honor of the farmers who have contributed animals for the meal, or who have contributed gifts to the brotherhood. Much like the briança it serves as a moment to raise funds for the events; those invited traditionally include illustrious social figures and local politicians.

== See also ==
- Cult of the Lord Holy Christ of the Miracles
