= Gerardo of Borgo San Donnino =

Italian Franciscan Joachimite (died 1278)

Gerard of Borgo San Donnino (Italian: Gerardo di Borgo San Donnino) was an Italian friar of the Order of Friars Minor.

== Biography ==
Gerardo was born at an unknown date in Borgo San Donnino (now Fidenza), then an independent commune, now part of the Province of Parma. He went to Paris to complete his studies. There, in 1248, according to Salimbene di Adam, he attempted to convince King Louis IX of France not to organize the Sixth Crusade.

He was a Joachimite, a follower of the millenarian ideas of Abbot Joachim of Fiore (Gioacchino da Fiore). In 1254, Gerardo published in Paris a book entitled Introductorium in Evangelium Aeternum (An Introduction to the Eternal Gospel), where he identified the "Order of the Just," supposed to rule the Roman Catholic Church after the advent of the Age of the Holy Spirit, in the Franciscan Order.

This text was examined by a commission of cardinals set up by Pope Alexander IV, who was worried about the diffusion of Joachimite theories among the Friars Minor. In 1255, the council ordered the destruction of the book and in 1263 Gerardo was arrested and sentenced to life in prison. He remained in prison until his death in 1276, still refusing to recant his beliefs.
