= Azores Day =

Regional holiday in the Azores

- Official name: Dia da Região Autónoma dos Açores
- Also called: Dia dos Açores
- Observed by: Azores, Portugal
- Type: Regional
- Significance: A celebration of the Azores autonomy, following the Carnation Revolution, the holiday transformed into a historical, cultural and social affirmation of the region
- Celebrations: Military parades, Honours, Concerts
- Date: Pentecost Monday
- 2025 date: 9 June
- 2026 date: 25 May
- 2027 date: 17 May
- 2028 date: 5 June
- Frequency: annual
- Related to: Pentecost

Azores Day (Portuguese: Dia dos Açores) is a regional holiday in the Portuguese archipelago of the Azores. It commemorates the establishment of Azorean political autonomy in the Portuguese Constitution, following the Carnation Revolution. The date corresponds to the Festival of the Holy Spirit, a celebration based in the archipelago's religious and cultural history, held on the Sunday of Pentecost, a movable public holiday observed only in the archipelago of the Azores.

== History ==
It had its base in other attempts to implement a level of autonomy, like the 19th century decree of 2 March 1895.

It was in June 1976 that the regional elections installed the first Legislature of the Azores, followed by the installation of a Government for the region, and later direct universal local authority elections in December.

At the state level, the Day of the Azores corresponds to Dia de Portugal, de Camões e das Comunidades Portuguesas (Portugal Day), which was instituted by Portuguese decrees 51/92 (11 April 1992), 39B/78 (2 March 1978) and 80/77 (4 March 1977). The day, instituted within the Third Portuguese Republic, does not correspond to the Portugal's creation: some suggest that the day was 24 June 1128, the day that Afonso Henriques defeated his adversaries in Guimarães, while another thesis supported 24 July 1137, when this nobleman defeated the Moors at the Battle of Ourique.

The Day of the Azores, designated to the Dia da Região Autónoma dos Açores (Day of the Autonomous Region of the Azores), corresponds to the Monday of the Holy Spirit, held annually on 16 May. It was legislated by the government of Mota Amaral on 21 August 1980, under Regional Decree 13/89/A. At the original celebrations, apart from representatives of the government, the President of the Regional Legislature, Álvaro Monjardino and Minister of the Republic Henrique Horta were in attendance.

The preamble of the regional law justifies the institution of this day as both historic and based on the sentiments of Azoreans worldwide:

Comprised of small communities, isolated for centuries, the Azores and kept cults, popular practices deeply and totally rooted in everyday life and distinctly Portuguese origin. Perhaps the most significant of them all will be the celebration of the Holy Spirit – that intertwine of the noblest Christian traditions with the celebration of spring, of life, of solidarity and Hope – whose vitality celebration extends naturally to all Azorean cores around the world. The celebrations [of the Holy Spirit] are spontaneous, as vivid and intense as the nature of things, they impose an inevitable rest on the first business day that follows them. Because they are the most popular days of rest and recreation throughout the region, it is fair to consecrate [this day] as an affirmation of Azorean identity, of their philosophy of life and its regional unity – the base and justification of political autonomy to them recognized and proudly exercise.

== Commemorations ==
Over time, the original context of Azores Day has changed from a commemoration of a "Day of Autonomy" to one based on the celebration of the political, religious, traditional and historic context of the Azores within Portugal. Political quarrels between the Azores and the national government are usually highlighted during these celebrations, with political commentaries made by the President of the Regional Government.

The Regional Government has traditionally held official celebrations on each island of the Azores since 1980. In 1997, Azores Day was marked in Ponta Delgada, with the solemn opening of the Galeria dos Autonomistas (Autonomists' Gallery), in the Palace of Conceição (seat of the Regional Government). After this date, the celebrations marking the Day of the Azores, which since 2006 had already been marked with bestowing honours to illustrious Azoreans, began to occur on the various islands of the archipelago and Azorean communities abroad: Angra do Heroísmo (1998); Horta (1999 and 2006); Santa Cruz das Flores (2000); Fall River, Massachusetts, United States (2001); Ribeira Grande (2002); Ponta Delgada (2003); Santa Cruz da Graciosa (2004); Vila do Porto (2005); São Roque do Pico (2007); Velas (2008); Toronto, Ontario, Canada (2009); Vila do Corvo (2010); Praia da Vitória (2011) and Povoação (2012). During the celebration in Povoação, 47 honours (merit and recognition) were bestowed to Azoreans or Luso-descendents in the fields of industry, commerce, and agriculture.
