= Santa Maria della Matina =

Abbey in San Marco Argentano, Italy

Coordinates: 39°34′34″N 16°08′59″E

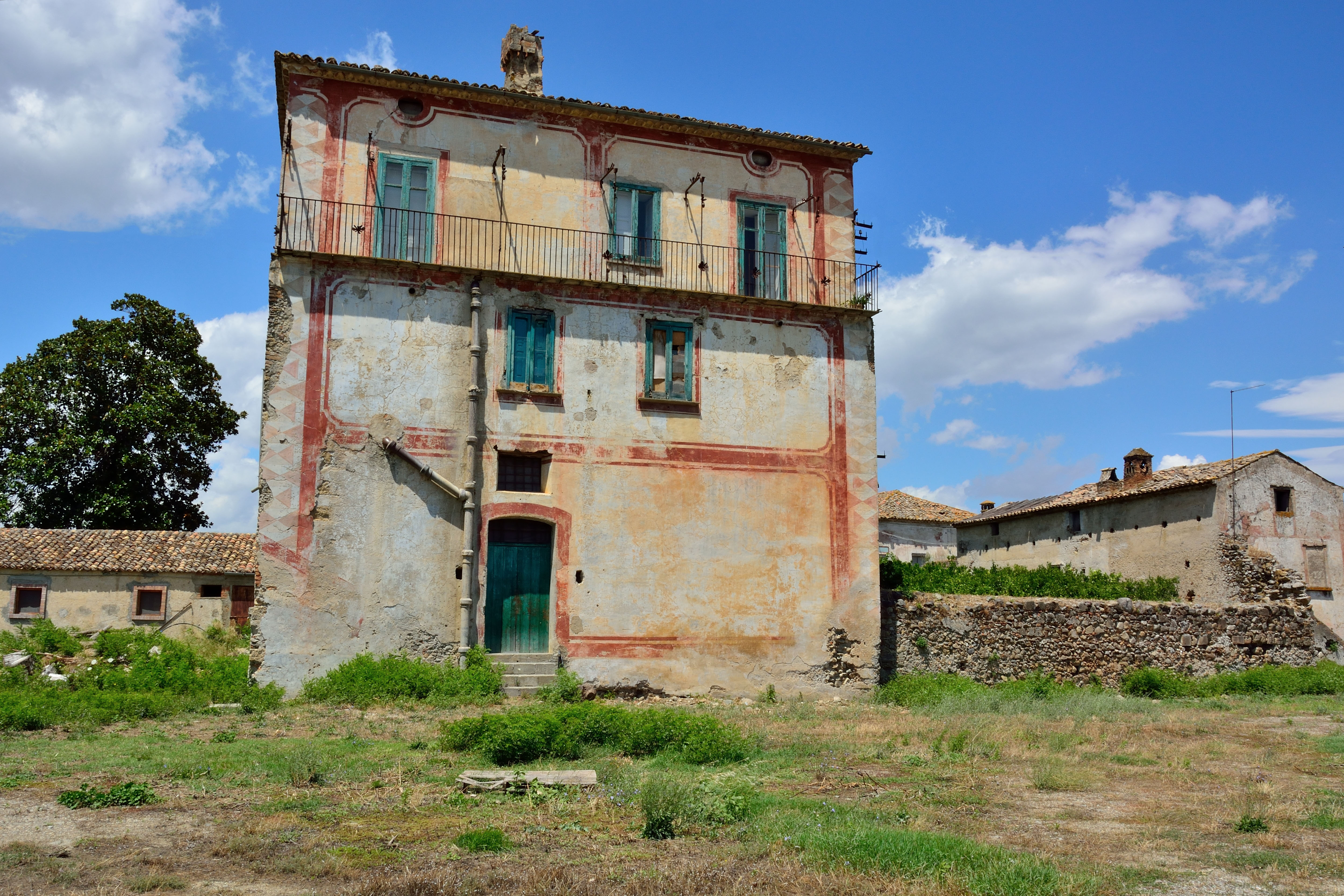

Santa Maria della Matina was a monastery near San Marco Argentano in Calabria. It was originally Benedictine, but later became Cistercian.

In 1065, at the urging of Pope Nicholas II, a monastery was founded at Matina by Robert Guiscard, duke of Apulia and Calabria, and his wife, Sichelgaita. On 31 March, by order of Nicholas' successor, Alexander II, the monastery was dedicated in a ceremony officiated by Archbishop Arnulf of Cosenza, with the bishops Odo of Rapolla and Lawrence of Malvito in attendance, before Robert and Sichelgaita and the first abbot, Abelard. The monastery received rich gifts from its Norman patrons, but also a large piece land from the diocese of Malvito, for which the bishop was compensated in gold. In 1660, Gregorio de Laude, abbot of Santa Maria del Sagittario, who had seen the now lost parchments of the foundation himself, described it thus:

Monasterium Matinae a Robert Nortmando Apuliae et Calabriae Duce, uxoreque sua Sirlegatta anno 1066 [sic] fundatum, tunc Nigrorum, modo Cisterciensium Monachorum Casamaris filiationis situm in Calabria, duobus dissitum milliariis a ... Sancti Marci Urbe.
Robert the Norman, duke of Apulia and Calabria, and his wife Sichelgaita, founded the monastery of Matina in 1066, then Benedictine, now Cistercian, a daughter of the monks of Casamari in Calabria, two miles removed from ... San Marco.

The monastery was under the direct ecclesiastical jurisdiction of the Papacy. As such, it appears in the earliest redaction of the Liber censuum of the early twelfth century. On 18 November 1092, Pope Urban II visited the monastery. In 1167, the Frenchman William of Blois became abbot, but resigned his position by 1169. By this time, the monastery was in decline. Joachim of Fiore refused the request of King Tancred of Sicily to move his new religious foundation at Fiore to Matina.

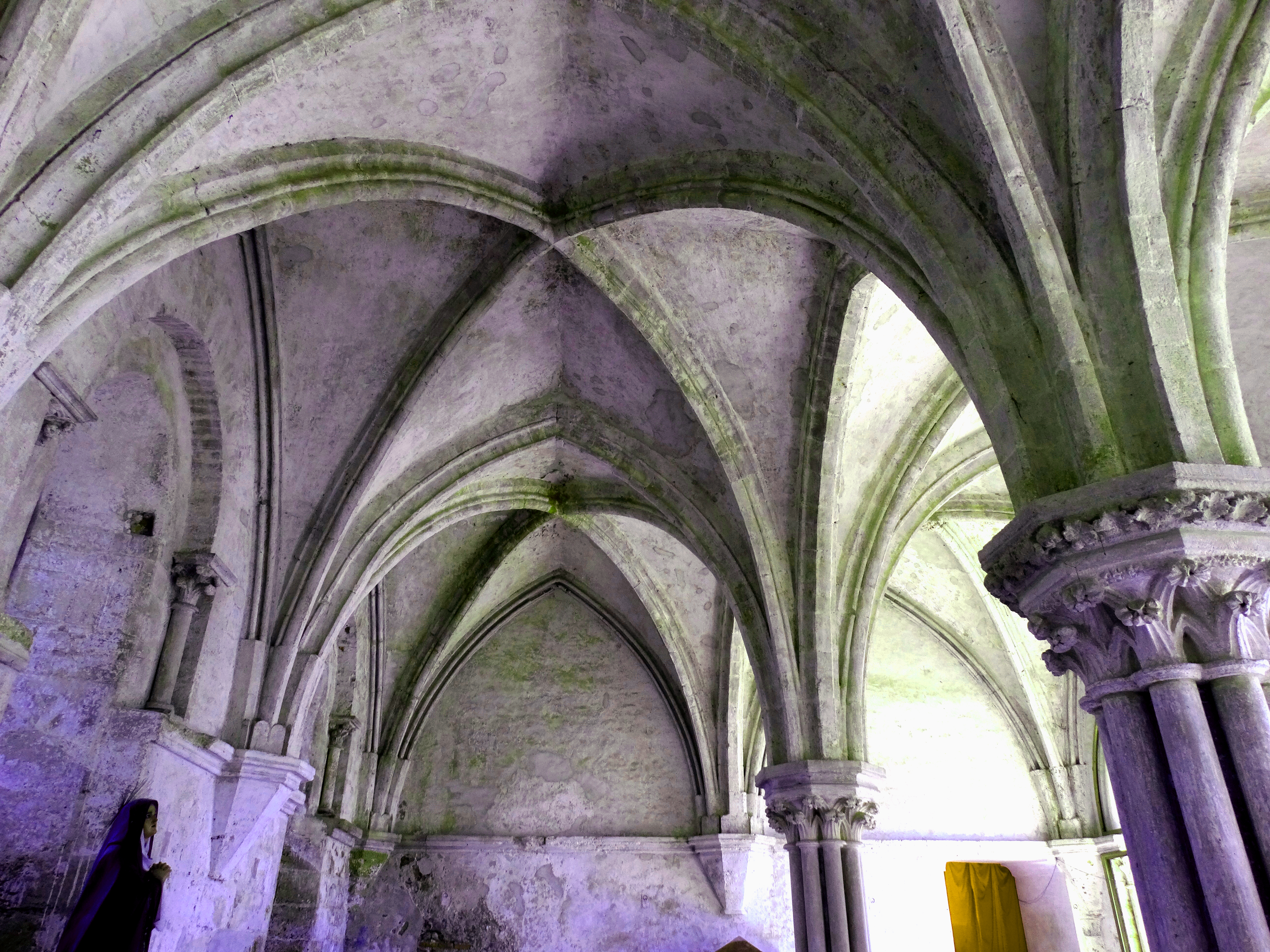

There has long been speculation that Matina became Cistercian in 1179 or 1180. This is contradicted by documents in the archive of the Aldobrandini family. In October 1221, upon request of the abbot of Sambucina and with the permission of Pope Honorius III and the bishops Andrew of San Marco Argentano and Luke of Cosenza, Matina finally became a Cistercian abbey dependent on Sambucina. In February 1222, the act received the consent of the Emperor Frederick II, and in June 1222 was confirmed by the pope. In 1235, the abbot of Casamari requested permission from the general chapter to send the monks to Sambucina for three months every summer on account of the climate.

From 1410, the monastery was usually given in commendam, causing further decline. In 1633, it joined the Cistercian congregation of Calabria and Basilicata. In 1652, the monastery was finally suppressed by Pope Innocent X, but the commandery remained until the abolition of feudalism in 1809, during the reign of Joachim Murat, when the land became state property. Subsequently the buildings and grounds were granted to General Luigi Valentoni, who transformed it into a farm. The property remained in his family until the end of the twentieth century.

In the seventeenth century, most of the abbey buildings, which dated to the thirteenth century, were still intact. Currently only ruins remain of the church. Among the best preserved parts are the parlour, the scriptorium, the staircase leading to the upper floors and chapel, and the Gothic chapter house, which has three naves with vaulted ceilings reminiscent of the abbey of Casamari.

== Sources ==
- White Jr., Lynn (July 1935). "For the Biography of William of Blois". The English Historical Review. 50 (199): 487–90. doi:10.1093/ehr/l.cxcix.487. JSTOR 553554.
