= San Marco Argentano =

- Comune
- Comune di San Marco Argentano
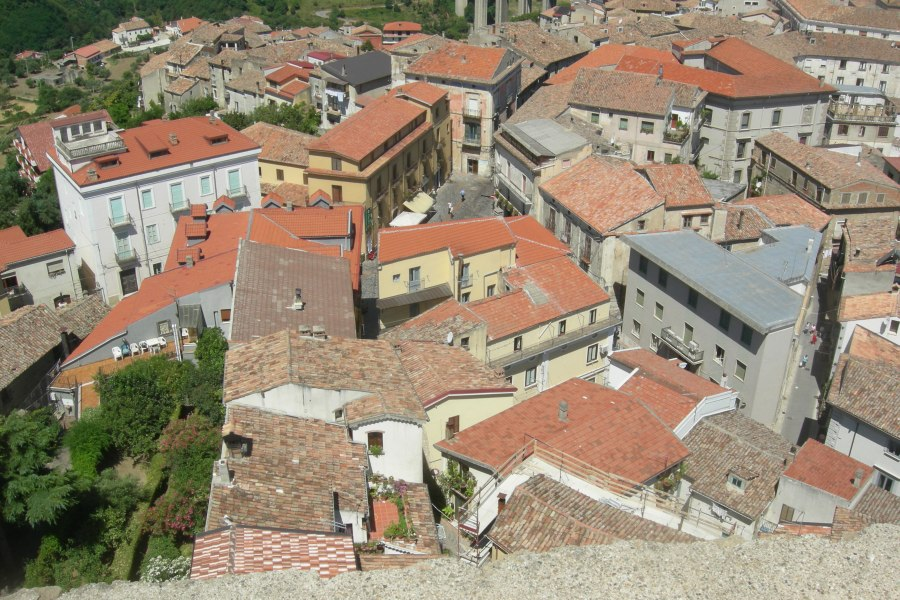
- View of the town from the Roman tower.

- Location within Italy Location within Calabria
- Coordinates: 39°33′N 16°07′E
- Country: Italy
- Region: Calabria
- Province: Cosenza (CS)

Government
  - Mayor: Virginia Mariotti

Area
  - Total: 80.5 km^{2} (31.1 sq mi)
- Elevation: 426 m (1,398 ft)

Population (31 July 2018)
  - Total: 7,419
  - Density: 92.2/km^{2} (239/sq mi)
- Demonym: Sanmarchesi
- Time zone: UTC+1 (CET)
  - Summer (DST): UTC+2 (CEST)
- Postal code: 87018
- Dialing code: 0984
- Patron saint: St. Mark the Evangelist
- Saint day: April 25
- Website: Official website

San Marco Argentano is a town and comune in the province of Cosenza in the Calabria region of southern Italy.

Main sights include the Norman tower, several churches and the ruins of an abbey, Santa Maria della Matina.

San Marco Argentano was the birthplace of Bohemond I of Antioch (1050s births), eldest son of Robert Guiscard and christened "Mark" at his baptism.
