= Celico =

Celico Greek: Kýlikos
- Comune
- Comune di Celico
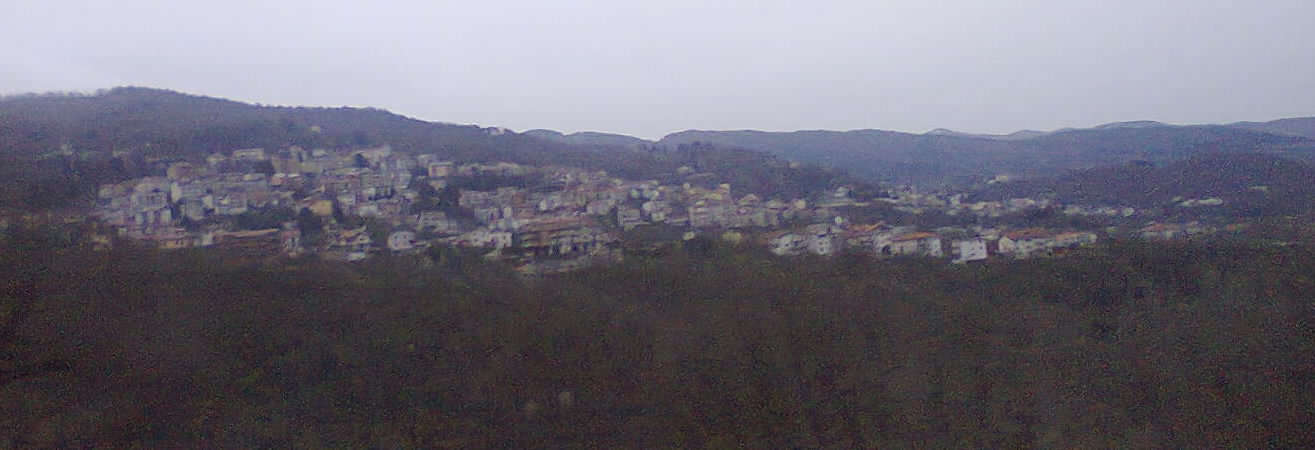

- Location within Italy Location within Calabria
- Coordinates: 39°19′N 16°20′E
- Country: Italy
- Region: Calabria
- Province: Cosenza (CS)
- Frazioni: Manneto, Fago del soldato

Government
  - Mayor: Matteo Francesco Lettieri

Area
  - Total: 99.75 km^{2} (38.51 sq mi)
- Elevation: 750 m (2,460 ft)

Population (31 March 2022)
  - Total: 2,510
  - Density: 25.2/km^{2} (65.2/sq mi)
- Demonym: Celichesi
- Time zone: UTC+1 (CET)
  - Summer (DST): UTC+2 (CEST)
- Postal code: 87053
- Dialing code: 0984
- Patron saint: St. Michael Archangel
- Saint day: September 29
- Website: Official website

Celico (Greek: Kylikos) is a town and comune in the province of Cosenza in the Calabria region of southern Italy.

== People ==
- Joachim of Fiore (c.1135 – 1202), mystic, theologian and esoterist
- Gioachino Greco (c. 1600 – c. 1634) (chess master and writer)
- Leandro Noce (1929 – 1999), contributing mayor and educator with a forward-thinking vision for the town's growth and development, inspiring confidence and direction.
