= Liber Figurarum =

12th-century theological codex

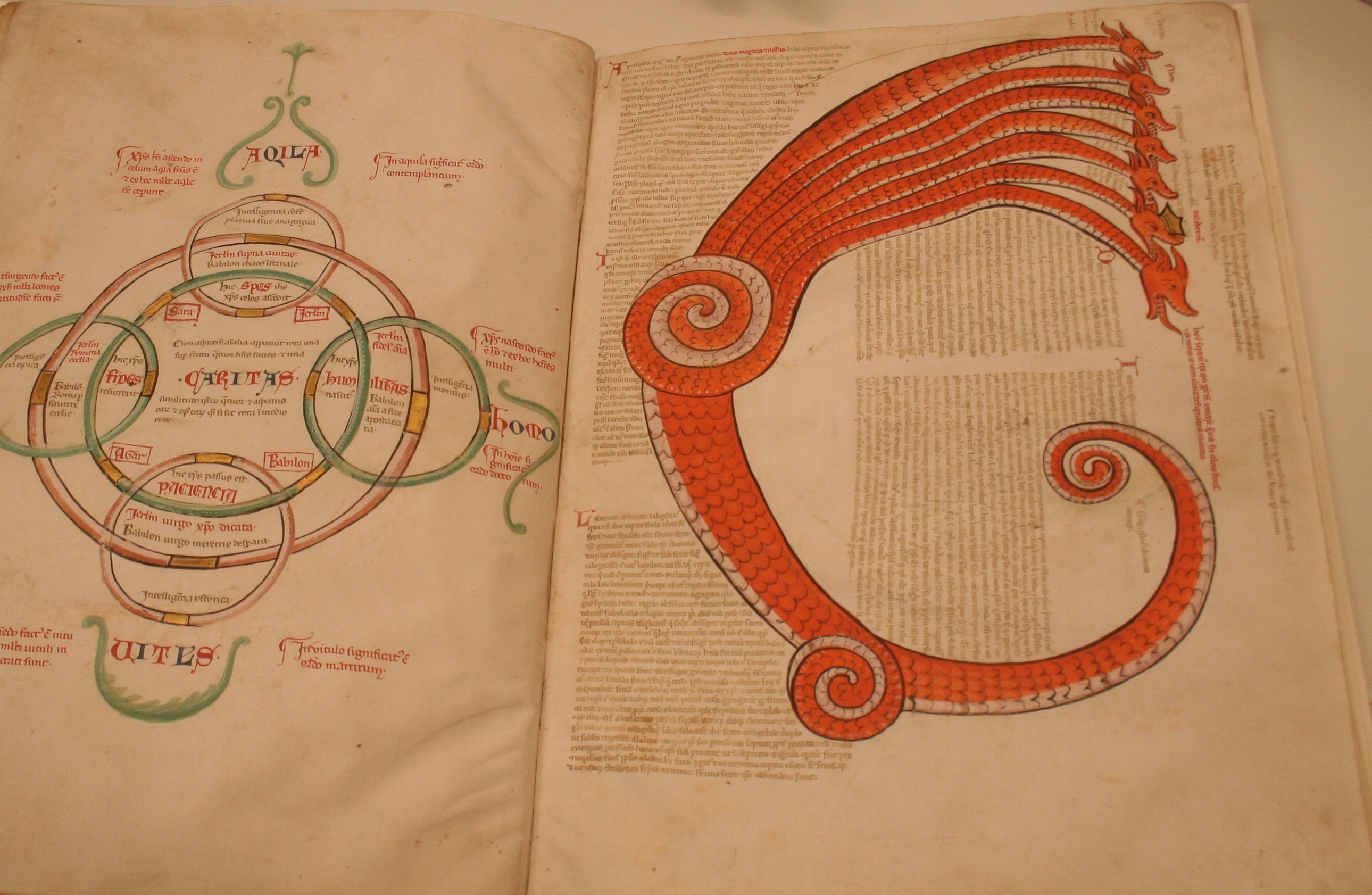
A page from the manuscript of the Liber Figurarum showing the seven-headed dragon, with the sixth head depicting Saladin.

The Liber Figurarum (lit. Book of Figures) is a collection of figures illustrating the work of Joachim of Fiore, who lived in Calabria in the twelfth century. Joachim of Fiore transformed his visions into images (figurae) and symbols to form the Liber Figurarum.

Three examples of the work are known, at Corpus Christi College, Oxford, at a museum in Dresden, Germany; and at the library of the seminary of Reggio Emilia, discovered by the Italian scholar Leone Tondelli in 1937.

The oldest codex is Oxford, Corpus Christi College MS 255A, discovered by the British historian Marjorie Reeves in 1942.
