= Joachim of Fiore =

Italian Christian theologian, Catholic abbot, and apocalyptic thinker (died 1202)

- Joachim of Flora portrayed by Gregorio Vasquez de Arce y Ceballos, 1680, Colonial Museum, Bogotá
- Born: 1135; Celico, Calabria, Kingdom of Sicily
- Died: 30 March 1202 (aged 66–67)

Philosophical work
- Era: Medieval philosophy
- Region: Western philosophy; Italian philosophy
- School: Joachimitism; Historicism
- Notable ideas: Premillennialism; Three Eras

Joachim of Fiore, also known as Joachim of Flora (Italian: Gioacchino da Fiore; Latin: Ioachim Florensis; c. 1135 – 30 March 1202), was an Italian Christian theologian, Catholic abbot, and the founder of the monastic order of San Giovanni in Fiore. According to theologian Bernard McGinn, "Joachim of Fiore is the most important apocalyptic thinker of the whole medieval period." The Divine Comedy of Dante Alighieri is one of the most famous works possibly inspired by his ideas. Later followers, inspired by his works in Christian eschatology and historicist theories, are called Joachimites.

== Biography ==
Born in the small village of Celico near Cosenza, in Calabria (at the time part of the Kingdom of Sicily), Joachim was the son of Mauro de Celico, a well-placed notary, and Gemma, his wife. He was educated at Cosenza, where he became first a clerk in the courts, and then a notary himself. In 1166–1167, he worked for Stephen du Perche, archbishop of Palermo (c. 1167–1168) and counsellor of Margaret of Navarre, regent for the young William II of Sicily.

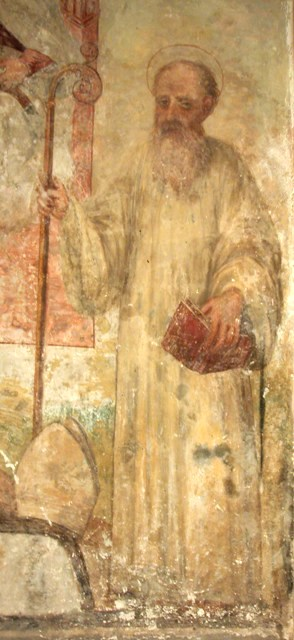
A 1573 fresco depicting Gioacchino da Fiore, in the Cathedral of Santa Severina, Calabria, Italy

About 1159, he went on pilgrimage to the Holy Land, where he experienced a spiritual crisis and conversion in Jerusalem that turned him away from worldly life. When he returned, he lived as a hermit for several years, wandering and preaching before joining the Cistercian abbey of Sambucina near Luzzi in Calabria, as a lay brother without taking the religious habit. There, he devoted his time to lay preaching. With the ecclesiastical authorities raising objections to his mode of life, Joachim joined the monks of the Abbey of Corazzo, and was ordained a priest, apparently in 1168. He applied himself entirely to Biblical study, with a special view to uncovering the arcane meanings he thought were concealed in the Scriptures, especially in the apostle John's Revelation. To his dismay, the monks of Corazzo proclaimed him their abbot (c. 1177). He then attempted to join the Cistercian Order, but was refused because of the community's poverty. In the winter of 1178, he appealed in person to William II, who granted the monks some lands.

In 1182, Joachim appealed to Pope Lucius III, who relieved him of the temporal care of his abbey, and warmly approved of his work, bidding him to continue it in whatever monastery he thought best. Joachim spent the following year and a half at the Cistercian Abbey of Casamari, where he engaged in writing his three great books. There, the young monk, Lucas (afterwards Archbishop of Cosenza), who acted as his secretary, was amazed to see so famous and eloquent a man wearing such rags, and the wonderful devotion with which he preached and said Mass.

In 1184, he was in Rome, interpreting an obscure prophecy found among the papers of Cardinal Matthew of Angers, and was encouraged by Pope Lucius III. Succeeding popes confirmed the papal approbation, though his manuscripts had not begun to circulate. Joachim retired first to the hermitage of Pietralata, writing all the while, and then founded the Abbey of Fiore (Flora) in the mountains of Calabria. He refused the request of King Tancred of Sicily (r. 1189–1194) to move his new religious foundation to the existing Cistercian monastery of Santa Maria della Matina.

On Good Friday in 1196, Empress Constance, also Queen of Sicily, summoned Joachim of Fiore to Palermo to hear her confession in the Palatine Chapel. Initially, the empress sat on a raised chair, but when Joachim told her that, as they were at the places of Christ and Mary Magdalene, she needed to lower herself, she sat on the ground.

Fiore became the centre of a new and stricter branch of the Cistercian order, approved by Celestine III in 1198.

In 1200, Joachim publicly submitted all his writings to the examination of Innocent III, but died in 1202 before any judgment was passed. The holiness of his life was widely known: Dante affirmed that miracles were said to have been wrought at his tomb, and, though never officially beatified, he is still venerated as a beatus on 29 May.

He theorized the dawn of a new age, based on his interpretation of verses in the Book of Revelation, in which the Church would be unnecessary and in which infidels would unite with Christians. Members of the spiritual wing of the Franciscan order acclaimed him as a prophet. However, Joachim denied being a prophet himself. His popularity was enormous in the period. Richard the Lionheart met with him in Messina before leaving for the Third Crusade of 1189–1192 to ask for his prophetic advice.

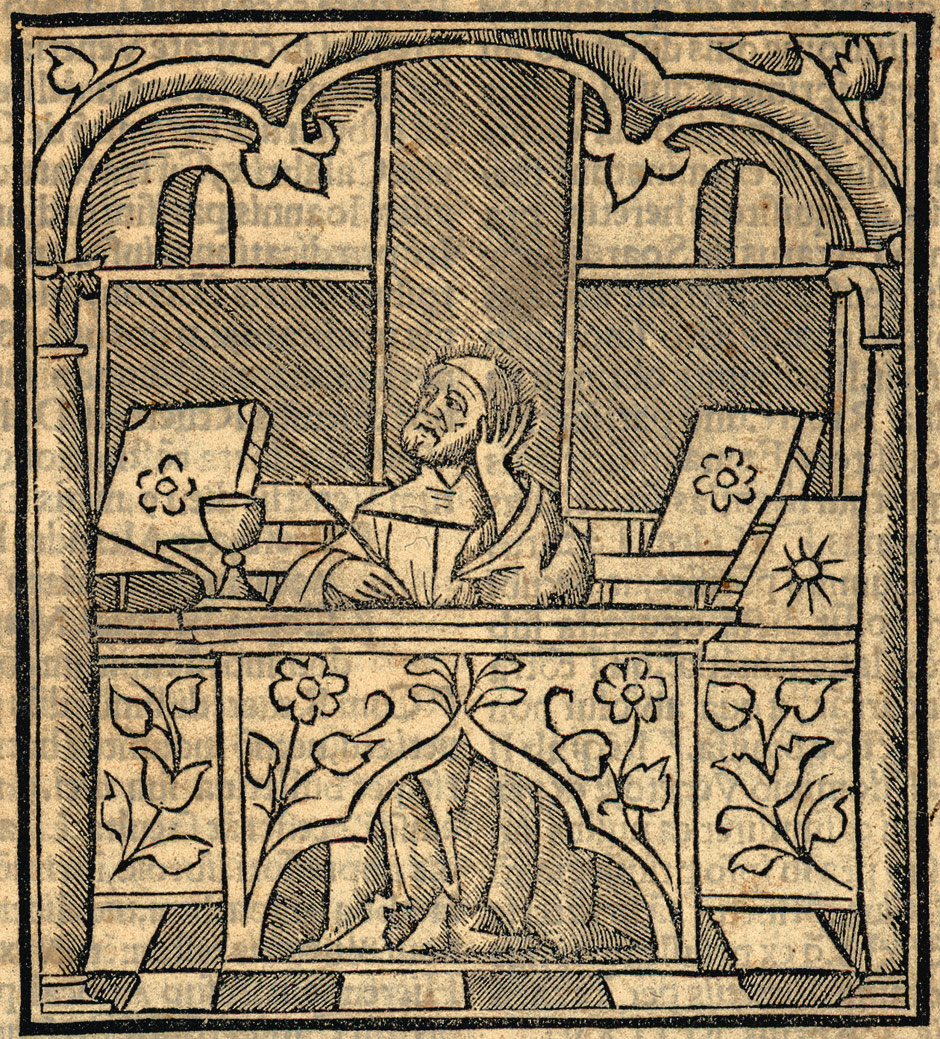
"Joachim in his study”, woodcut from a 1516 edition.

His famous Trinitarian "IEUE" interlaced-circles diagram was influenced by the different 3-circles Tetragrammaton-Trinity diagram of Petrus Alphonsi, and in turn led to the use of the Borromean rings as a symbol of the Christian Trinity (and possibly also influenced the development of the Shield of the Trinity diagram).

== Theory of the three ages ==
The mystical basis of his teaching is his doctrine of the "eternal gospel", founded on an interpretation of Revelation 14:6 (Rev 14:6, "Then I saw another angel flying in midheaven, with an eternal gospel to proclaim to those who live on the earth—to every nation and tribe and language and people." NRSV translation.).

His theories can be considered millenarian; he believed that history, by analogy with the Trinity, was divided into three fundamental epochs:

- The Age of the Father, corresponding to the Old Testament, characterized by the obedience of mankind to the Rules of God;
- The Age of the Son, between the advent of Christ and 1260, represented by the New Testament, when Man became the son of God;
- The Age of the Holy Spirit, impending, a contemplative utopia. The Kingdom of the Holy Spirit, a new dispensation of universal love, would proceed from the Gospel of Christ, but transcend the letter of it. In this new Age the ecclesiastical organization would be replaced, and the Order of the Just would rule the Church. This Order of the Just was later identified with the Franciscan order by his follower Gerardo of Borgo San Donnino.

Joachim's idea of the Age of the Holy Spirit would also later greatly influence the Cult of the Holy Spirit, which would in later centuries have a considerable impact in Portugal and its colonies, and would suffer severe persecution by the Portuguese Inquisition.

According to Joachim, only in this third age will it be possible to truly understand the words of God in their deepest meanings, and not merely literally. In this period, instead of the parousia (second Advent of Christ), a new epoch of peace and concord would begin; also, a new religious "order" of spiritual men would arise, thus making the present hierarchy of the Church almost unnecessary.

Joachim distinguished between the "reign of justice" or "of law" in an imperfect society, and the "reign of freedom" in a perfect society.

Joachim saw that a pope would be the Antichrist and that Rome represents Babylon.

== Source of inspiration for Christopher Columbus ==
The thought of Joachim of Fiore inspired numerous historical figures, including Christopher Columbus. As Columbus's writings testify, he was aware of Joachim's prophecies about the end times and the coming of the Time of the Holy Spirit. In the Complete Collection of the Writings of Christopher Columbus, in which he illustrates and documents the discovery of America, it is written: "I say that I owe to the Holy Spirit all my navigation from my youth onwards." Not only does Columbus cite Joachim of Fiore in the Book of Prophecies (Libro de las Profecías), but also in the letter extracted from the Colombina Library in Seville (138 n. 25). Columbus recognized the symbolic meaning of Mount Zion in the Bible, the hill to the east of heavenly Jerusalem, the ideal and spiritual city: "Abbot Joachim said, he who has to rebuild the house of Mount Zion must leave Spain."

== Condemnation ==
Joachim's theories were disputed by Thomas Aquinas in his Summa Theologica (written 1265–1274). In contrast, Dante Alighieri situated Joachim in the Paradiso of his Divine Comedy (composed c. 1320). Among the Spirituals, the stricter branch of the Franciscans, a Joachite group arose, many of whom saw Antichrist already in the world in the person of Frederick II, Holy Roman Emperor (who died in 1250).

As the appointed year (1260) approached, spurious works began to circulate under Joachim's name: De Oneribus Prophetarum, an Expositio Sybillae et Merlini ("Exposition of the Sibyl and Merlin") and commentaries on the prophecies of Jeremiah and Isaiah. The Fourth Council of the Lateran, in 1215, condemned some of his ideas about the nature of the Trinity. In 1263, the archbishop Fiorenzo enhanced the condemnation of his writings and those of his follower Gerardo of Borgo San Donnino, joining a commission in the Synod of Arles, in which Joachim's theories were declared heretical. The accusation was of having an unorthodox view of the Holy Trinity.

His views also inspired several subsequent movements: the Amalricians, the Dulcinians and the Brethren of the Free Spirit. All of these were eventually declared heretical by the Catholic Church. Joachimite interpretations became popular in the Protestant Reformation, and even influenced some Protestant interpretations. Joachim also possibly influenced Dante.

Of importance is the fact that Joachim himself was never condemned as a heretic by the Church; rather, the ideas and movement surrounding him were condemned. Joachim, the man, was held in high regard during his lifetime.

During an event in Rome, 25 June 2025, Monsignor Antonio Staglianò (President of the Pontifical Academy of Theology) explained that Joachim of Fiore was never condemned, but "the accusation that Joachim of Fiore had made against Peter Lombard, who at the time was the great master of judgments, was rejected!" and that Joachim of Fiore's Trinitarian thought was correct.

== Literary references ==
Joachim of Fiore was one of the most influential figures of the Renaissance of the 12th century. It has been argued that the Divine Comedy of Dante Alighieri is largely inspired by the ideas of the Abbot using the interpretation given by his follower Peter John Olivi, active in Florence at the end of the 13th century.

Joachim may be referred to by the 16th century English cartographer and court magician John Dee, who refers in his influential 1570 work Preface to Euclid to "Ioachim the Prophesier" who "by Numbers Formall, Naturall, and Rationall, forseyng, concludyng, and forshewyng great particular euents, long before their comming." (Rendered in contemporary English: "Joachim the Prophet, who by numbers formal, natural, and rational, foreseeing, concluding, and foretelling, great particular events, long before their coming.")

Scholars like Oswald Spengler, Henri de Lubac and Eric Voegelin note that Joachim's theological model of a progressive, three-stage movement toward a spiritual culmination laid the conceptual groundwork for modern philosophies of history, most notably Hegelian historicism.

Joris-Karls Huysmans' novella Là-bas makes reference to Joachim de Fiore's millenarian eschatology in its concluding scenes, with several characters espousing similar views, presaging the protagonist's conversion to Catholicism.

W. B. Yeats's short story "The Tables of the Law" tells about a single surviving copy of a certain book by Joachim of Flora and its powerful effects on its owner.

Joachim, referred to as Joachim Abbas, is referenced in James Joyce's Ulysses and Giacomo Joyce and Stephen Hero.

Joachim is mentioned in Umberto Eco's medieval mystery The Name of the Rose. His influence on the Franciscan Spirituals and the rediscovery of his books, foreseeing the advent of a new age, are part of the book's background story in which an inquisitorial debate is held in a remote monastery where a number of murders take place.

The sprawling conspiracy satire entitled the Illuminatus! trilogy of novels by Robert Anton Wilson and Robert Shea also references Joachim of Fiore repeatedly. His writings fit well with the eschatological tone of the story. The authors attempt to confuse matters and give an air of authenticity to the madness of the various plotlines by including references to real people and events.

In 2023, a film inspired by the life of Joachim Joachim and the Apocalypse was produced.

== Works ==
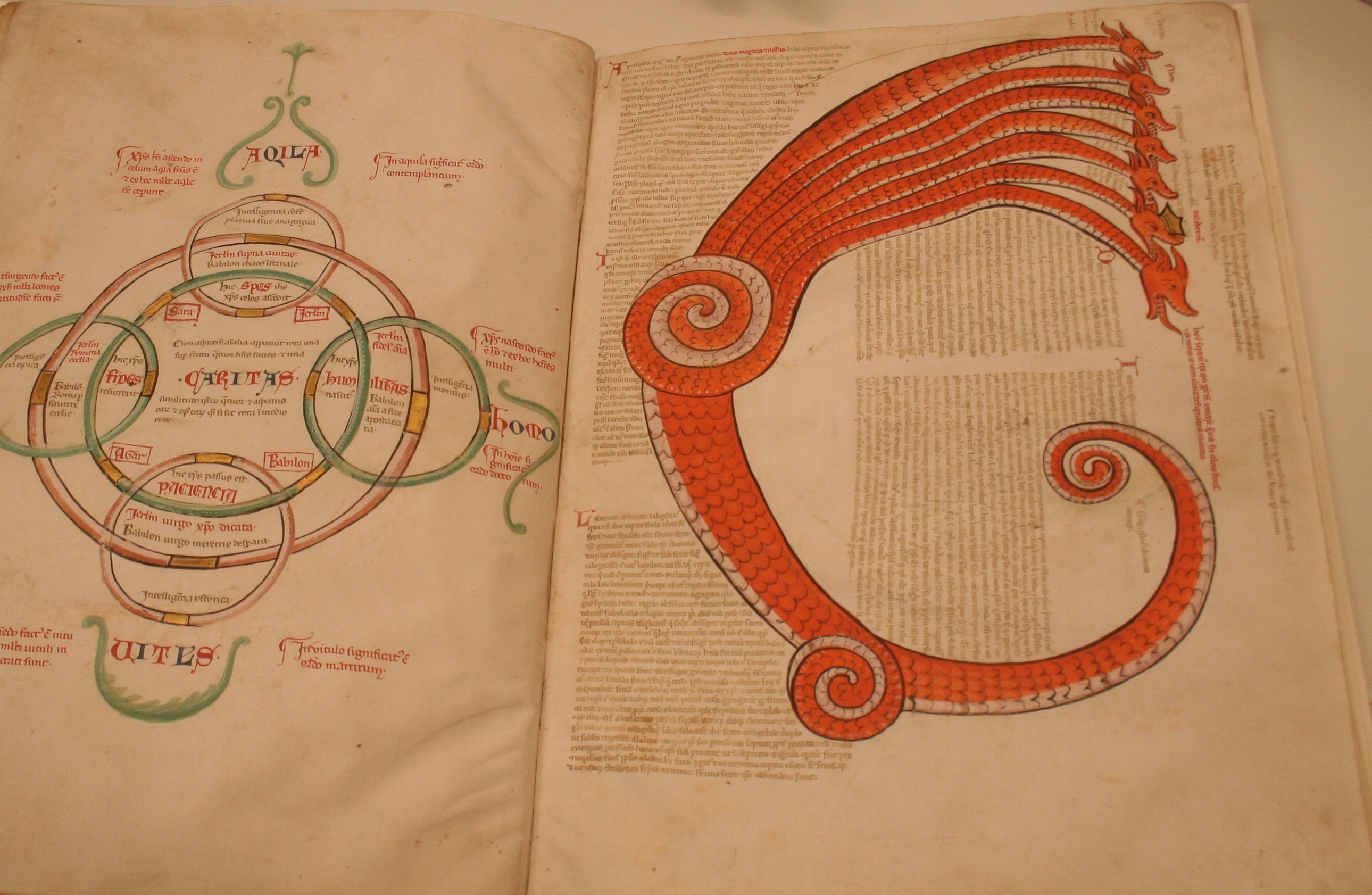
Page of Liber Figurarum, 12th century - showing a Seven-Headed Dragon at right

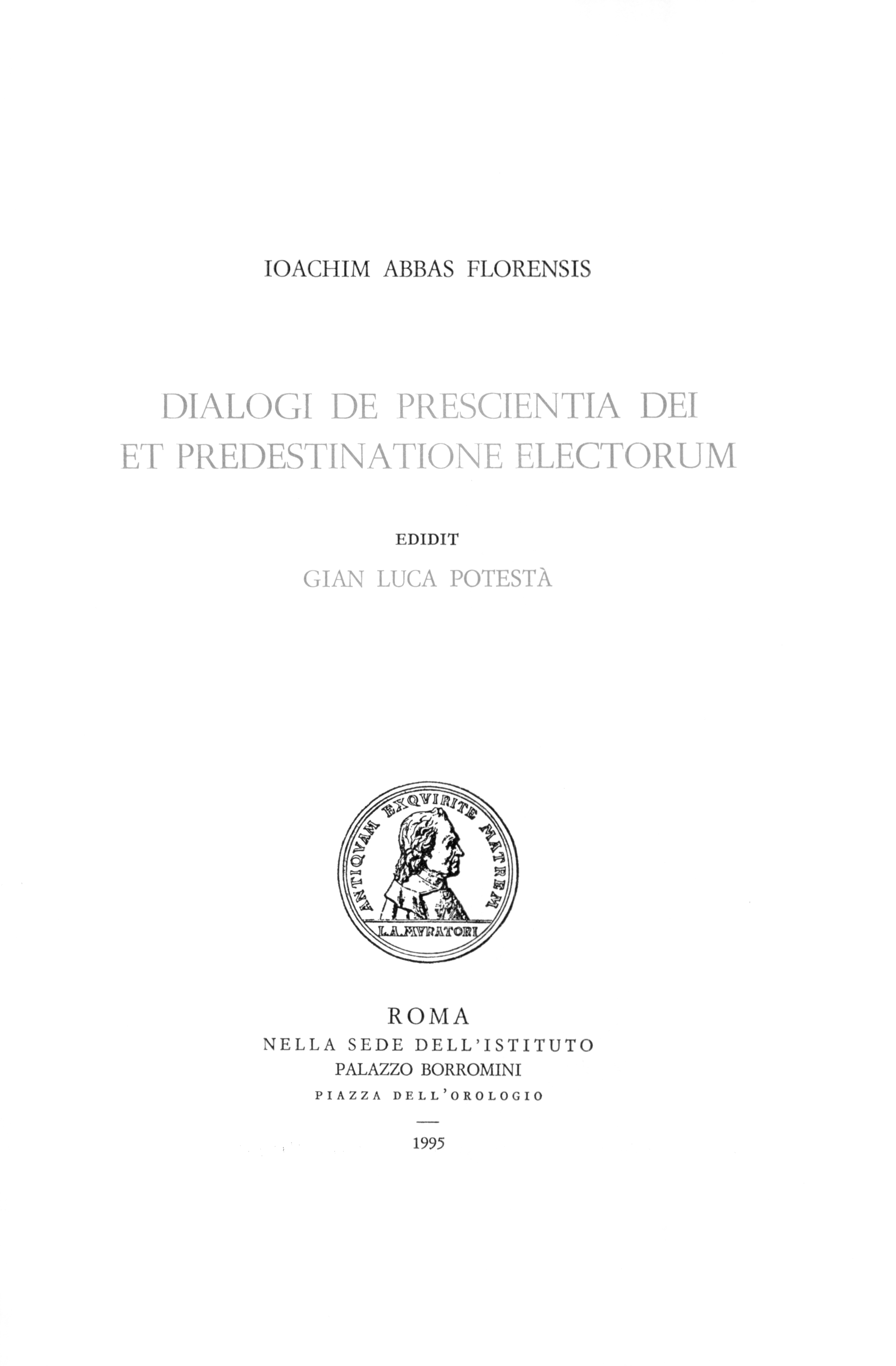
Dialogi de prescientia Dei

- Liber Concordiae Novi ac Veteris Testamenti (Harmony of the Old and New Testaments/Book of Concordance), completed in 1200.
- Expositio in Apocalipsim (Exposition of the Book of Revelation), finished around 1196–1199. The Liber introductoris in Apocalypsim, sometimes cited as a separate work, forms an introduction to this.
- Psalterium Decem Cordarum (Psaltery of Ten Strings).
- Tractatus super quatuor Evangelia (Treatise on the four Gospels).
- De Gloria Paradisi (Visio admirandae historiae)

Lesser works include:

- Genealogia (Genealogy), written about 1176.
- De prophetia ignota, dateable to 1184.
- Adversus Judeos (also known as Exhortatorium Iudeorum), probably written in the early 1180s.
- De articulis fidei, probably written in the early 1180s.
- Professio fidei, probably written in the early 1180s.
- Tractatus in expositionem vite et regule beati Benedicti, sermons belonging to the late 1180s.
- Praephatio super Apocalipsim. Written around 1188–1192.
- Intelligentia super calathis. Written in 1190–1.
- De ultimis tribulationibus, which is a short sermon by Joachim.
- Enchiridion super Apocalypsim. Written in 1194–96, this is an earlier and shorter version of the Liber introductorius that prefaces Joachim's Expositio in Apocalipsim.
- De septem sigillis. It is uncertain when this was written.
- The Liber Figurarum was drawn together soon after Joachim's death in 1202, and is a collection of 24 'figurae' drawn by Joachim. The name was used in thirteenth-century manuscripts to describe a work attributed to Joachim of Fiore, but it was only in the mid-twentieth century that it was identified in relation to three extant manuscripts.
- The late thirteenth-century set of pseudo-prophecies, united with a later series under the title Vaticinia de Summis Pontificibus was falsely attributed to Joachim of Fiore without any basis in truth.

== See also ==
- Book of Revelation
- Cult of the Holy Spirit
- Ernesto Buonaiuti (one of the first researchers in Joachinism)
- List of Christian mystics
- Vaticinia de Summis Pontificibus
