= Three Eras =

Judeo-Christian historical periodization

The Three Eras is a medieval Christian scheme of periodization in historiography. It supposed that world history was made up of three periods corresponding to the persons of the Trinity, consisting of an era of the Father, followed by an era of the Son, and finally an era of the Holy Spirit. The doctrine was perhaps first adhered to by the Amalricians, a form of Christianity in the Middle Ages considered heretical by the Catholic Church. It was later taken up by Joachim of Fiore.

After the Protestant Reformation the scheme of the "prophecy of Elias" was popularised by Philip Melanchthon and his Lutheran collaborators, using Carion's Chronicle as a vehicle, heavily edited into due form. The three periods were 'without the law', 'under law', and 'under grace'. With each period attributed a length of two millennia, the scheme was applied to predict the end of time (or at least the commencement of a final seventh millennium). This was done by Johann Heinrich Alsted in the 17th century. The scheme was widely influential in its tripartite structure, seen also in the chronology of Achilles Pirmin Gasser.

== See also ==
- Six Ages of the World
- Joachim of Fiore § Theory of the three ages
