= Joachimites =

13th-century millenarian group

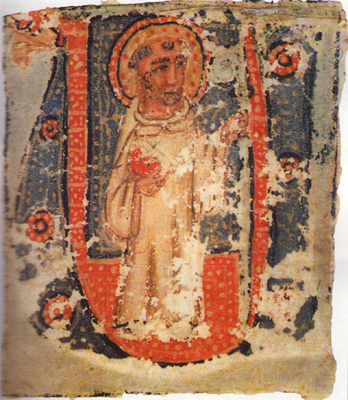
Joachim of Fiore

The Joachimites, also known as Joachites, a millenarian group, arose from the Franciscans in the thirteenth century. They based their ideas on the prior works of Joachim of Fiore (c. 1135 – 1202), though rejecting the Church of their day more strongly than he had. Joachimite beliefs were condemned by the Fourth Council of the Lateran and Joachimite interpretations became popular during the Protestant Reformation, and even influenced some Protestant interpretations. He also divided history into three ages: the ages of the Father, the Son, and the Holy Spirit.

== Beliefs of Joachim ==
Joachim of Fiore believed in a historicist interpretation of eschatology, and mysticism. Joachim's works divide history into three ages. The first age was of the Father. The age of the Father was the age of the Old Covenant. The second age was of the Son and therefore the world of Christianity. The third and final age would be that of the Holy Spirit. In this new age an "Eternal Gospel" would be revealed as "fulfilling" and replacing the organized church. After that society would be realigned on an egalitarian and utopian monastic base. The first age is said to have been of forty-two generations. The second age would also be of 42 generations. Joachim seemed to suggest the Christian era would end in 1260 with the coming of the Anti-Christ. After that, a utopian age would arrive. Joachim believed that the end could come at any moment, believing in the New Testament emphasis on the imminence of the end.

The main reason of Joachim was that history forms an image of its creator, and because the creator has three persons, history should be seen in three ages. Joachim also said that there were two great dispensations, which were the Old Testament and the New Testament.

Joachim believed that the Jews were the elect people of God during the Old Testament, he believed that during the "first seal" of the Old Testament the Jews endured oppression by the Egyptians, in the "second seal" they battled against the Canaanites and established their royal power and priesthood in Jerusalem. During the third seal, the kingdom of the Hebrews was divided into many tribes, in the fourth seal Israel paid a price for its sins and was conquered by the Assyrians, in the fifth seal the Chaldeans took Jerusalem and under the sixth seal the Jews suffered captivity in Babylon and in the seventh seal the Temple was rebuilt and the Jews had a time of peace until the Greeks came, which caused an end to the Old Covenant, and the era of the Father came to an end.

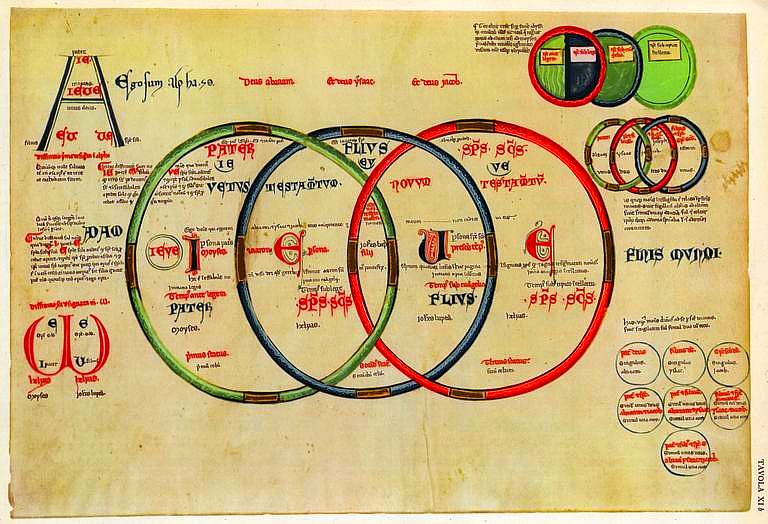
A page from the Liber Figurarum

The coming of Jesus resulted in the replacement of God's chosen people, Joachim believed that the blindness of Tobit (Tob 2:7-10) represented the blindness of the Hebrews, he believed that the Hebrews were too "carnal" in observing the law and did not have the "inner sight" to see the "light of Jesus". Joachim also saw the story of Zachary and Elizabeth (Luke 1:5-7) in a similar way, he saw that Zachary signified the relates of the Jews and Elizabeth the "church of the Levites". Elizabeth's pregnancy revealed that the Synagogue would give birth to Jesus, Zachary did not originally believe the angel Gabriel's proclamation that Elizabeth would have a child and became mute, which represents the duality of Jewish priesthood. Joachim believed that such as Tobit and Zachary were pious people, but they were still deprived of their sight and likewise, the Hebrews erred by a denial of the trinity and due to that the Hebrews lost their priesthood and loyal power which was given to the gentiles.

Joachim drew connections between the rise of Islam and errors of the Greek church, he especially criticized the Orthodox rejection of filioque as a heresy. According to Joachim, God promising Hezekiah protection in the Old Testament paralleled God's protection of the western Church under the Franks from the Islamic invasions, after the Byzantine empire was virtually destroyed. The rise of the Franks and their union with the papacy was a fascinating thing for Joachim, first the event showed that the power of the Byzantines had been destroyed, even though it wasn't completely destroyed, it also secondly inaugurated the "fifth seal", which in his interpretation was an era of peace and stability for the Western Church, which paralleled the protection given to Hezekiah. Joachim divided the history of the Church into three times: the time of "Israel", from Christ to Constantine: the time of "Egypt" which was from Constantine to Charles and to the time of "Babylon" which was to the time of Joachim from Charles.

Joachim believed that he saw that the Latin church had clear indications of entering into the days of lamentations predicted by Jeremiah. Joachim saw that pope Leo IX aligned with King Josiah of Judah who reformed religious life in his kingdom, but was destroyed by Pharaoh, after the failure of Leo at the battle of Civitate Joachim declared that the Pope had erred by trusting in "material arms" rather than spiritual weapons. Joachim believed that efforts to reform the church were not enough to save the Roman Church, like the last kings in Judah could not protect themselves against Babylon.

Joachim saw that the Antichrist would one day become a pope, he also saw that Rome represented Babylon, Joachim associated the papacy as both an absolute evil and with angelic good. Joachim of Fiore also believed that Israel will join the church before the end times and be converted and that the eastern and western churches will unify as "one flock".

Joachim believed in a futuristic millennial kingdom, as predicted in the book of Revelation, unlike people like Augustine who believed the millennium was already present, Joachim saw it as a 1000-year future event that is not yet present.

Joachim was a Trinitarian. He used to doubt the doctrine of the Trinity, however later he had a vision of a psaltery with 10 strings, in a triangular form, which clarified the Trinity to him. Joachim also attacked the views of Peter Lombard concerning the Trinity, in his book "Psaltery of Ten Strings".

== Controversy ==
In 1215 some of his ideas were condemned in the Fourth Council of the Lateran. Further, his admirers came to believe the beginning of this New Age would be ushered in by the coming of a virtuous Pope from the Franciscan order. They considered Celestine V (elected in 1294) to be this Pope. His resignation, and death in 1296 in the dungeons of the next Pope, was considered a sign of the coming of the Anti-Christ. Around this time, or somewhat before, they further decided Joachim's writings were the Eternal Gospel or the road to it.

The fact that the movement also moved toward a more practical approach did have some influence. It was one of the first movements to be heavily geared toward the future as being made perfectible through human action. This action was largely to lead toward a great supernatural event, but had a great deal of real-world notions of progress. Ultimately, however, this was also generally opposed, as utopian revelations were deemed to be foolishness or even heresy.

== Later influence ==
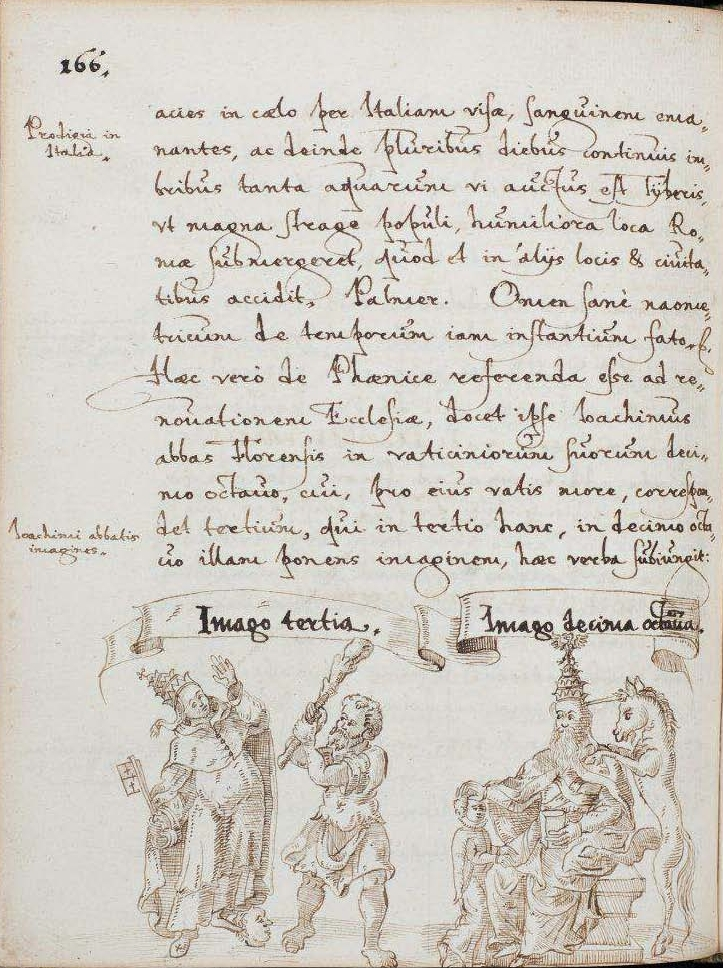
Joachim's prophecies 3 and 18 drawn by Jakob Lederlin in Simon Studion's Naometria (1604)

The Fraticelli were influenced by the teachings of Joachim. Joachim also possibly influenced the views of Dante.

Joachimite interpretations influenced some Puritans in the 17th and 18th centuries, and in modern times some Protestants such as Jurgen Moltmann were influenced by Joachim's theology, however, he is often viewed negatively by Catholics.

Scholars like Oswald Spengler, Henri de Lubac and Eric Voegelin note that Joachim's theological model of a progressive, three-stage movement toward a spiritual culmination laid the conceptual groundwork for modern philosophies of history, most notably Hegelian historicism.
