= John T. Walsh (Adventist) =

John Tomline Walsh
- Born: February 15, 1816; Hanover County, Virginia
- Died: August 6, 1886 (aged 70)
- Occupation(s): Founding member of the Advent Christian Church, minister

John T. Walsh (February 15, 1816 – August 6, 1886) was a minister and Millerite who, after the Great Disappointment, led a group of Adventist Millerites. They believed that Christ had returned on October 22 of 1844, only invisibly, and that the Millennium had begun on that date. This group organized as the Life and Advent Union in 1863 which later became part of the Advent Christian Church.

== History of Life and Advent Union ==
In 1845, the last conference of the Millerites as a body was held in Albany, New York, on April 29. After this conference, the Millerite movement split into three main factions. William Miller and Joshua Himes both affiliated with the first faction, which continued to believe in the imminent return of Christ, the immortality of the soul, and Sunday worship.

The second faction spiritualized Miller's prophecy concerning the Second Advent. They contended that Christ had returned on October 22, 1844, only invisibly, and that the Millennium had begun on that date. John T. Walsh was one of the principal leaders of this faction of Adventism which taught that the wicked would not be raised at the Second Advent but only during the Millennial Reign. Walsh began preaching in Wilbraham, Massachusetts where he taught the doctrine that the wicked would not be resurrected. Walsh was then an associate editor of the Bible Examiner, an adventist periodical published in New York City and edited by George Storrs.

In 1848 Walsh broke away from the Millerites to form the "Life and Advent Union." Because he held that the wicked would not be resurrected, he believed that this earth, not heaven, is to be the eternal abode of the righteous. Rejecting the "Age to Come" idea that there would be a chance for those who had never heard the gospel during their lifetime, Walsh did not believe that God would resurrect the unjust in order to condemn them to death. God was too "loving" for that, Walsh reasoned, and therefore the unjust dead would not be resurrected. Eternal life could be had only through Christ.

Walsh's and Storrs' differences to the beliefs of the main body of Adventists resulted in their finally forming a separate denomination called the Life and Advent Union, on August 30, 1863. It later merged with the Advent Christian Church.

== See also ==
- Restoration Movement
- Second Great Awakening
- Christian eschatology
- Millennialism
- History of the Seventh-day Adventist Church

== Sources ==
- J. T. Walsh, The Life And Times Of John Tomline Walsh With Biographical And Historical Sketches And Reflections On Contemporary Men And Things, Edited By A Member of His Family, Cincinnati, OH: Standard Publishing Company, 1885. (or here)
- Patrick Lee Woodward, „The Life Believers”: a Social History of the Life and Advent Union, Thesis, Princeton, 1970, p. 17-20.
- LeRoy Edwin Froom, Seventh Day Adventists, cited in: Vergilius Ferm (uitg.), The American Church of the Protestant Heritage, Philosophical Library, 1953. p. 384-385.
- Isaac C. Wellcome, History of the Second Advent message and mission, doctrine and people, Yarmouth, Maine, 1874. p. 627, 633.
- Albert C. Johnson, Advent Christian history: a concise narrative of the origin and progress, doctrine and work of this body of believers, Boston, Advent Christian Publication Society, 1918. p. 200-203.
- Arthur Whitefield Spalding, Origin and History of Seventh-Day Adventists, Review and Herald Publishing Association, 1962, p. 166.
- Iva J. Watkins, A Brief History of Adventism, Manchester, Connecticut, 1939, p. 26.
- Philip Schaff, The New Schaff-Herzog Encyclopedia of Religious Knowledge, Ann Arbor, Michigan. Vol. I, p. 56-57.
