= Seventh-day Adventist Church in Canada =

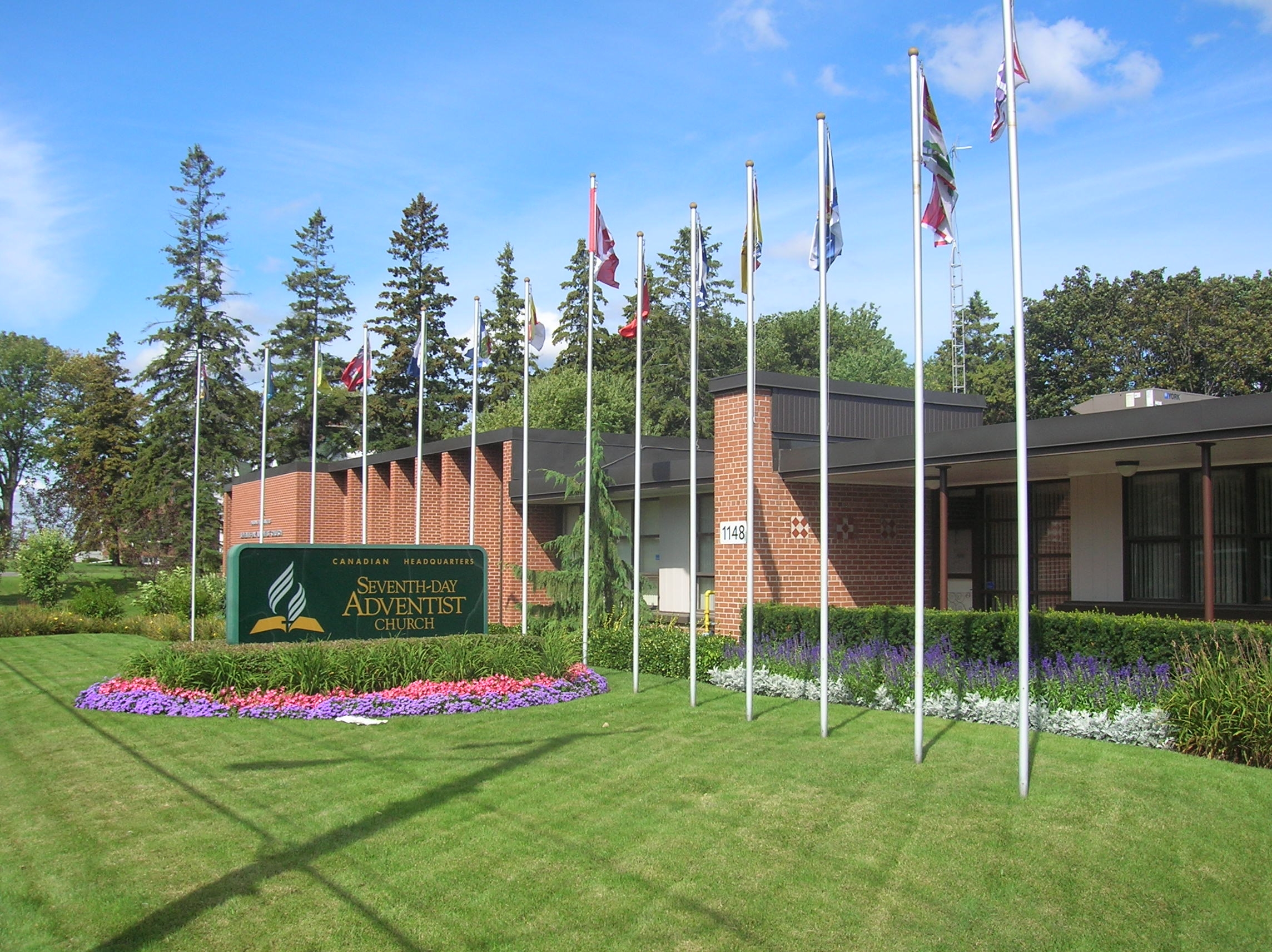
- SDACC Headquarters in Oshawa, Ontario
- Classification: Protestant
- Orientation: Adventist
- Polity: Modified presbyterian polity
- President: Paul Llewellyn
- Region: Canada
- Branched from: Millerites
- Aid organization: Adventist Development and Relief Agency
- Tertiary institutions: Burman University
- Other names: Adventist church, SDACC, Canadian Union

The Seventh-day Adventist Church in Canada (SDACC) is a constituent entity of the North American Division of Seventh-day Adventists (SDA). Its territory consists of all Canada and the French possessions of Saint Pierre and Miquelon (population of c. 38.8 million). As of 2022, the SDACC consisted of seven local conferences, 388 churches, and 74,191 members.

== History ==
=== Early history ===
Millerites in Canada

The Seventh-day Adventist Church developed from the Millerite movement of the 1830s and 1840s. William Miller traveled in response to invitations. This led him to the Eastern Townships of Quebec. Miller, Joshua Himes, and Josiah Litch all visited Canada. Miller's sister lived in the Eastern Townships of Quebec. Josiah Litch lived in that district and led in Millerite activities there. Canada became an integral part of their activities. The interest in Miller's teachings was extensive in the Canadas and the Maritimes. Under the leadership of Josiah Litch, the first Millerite camp meeting took place in Canada, at Hatley, Quebec.

Sabbatarian Adventists

After the disappointment of October 22, 1844, Millerites developed into several divergent groups. The Sabbatarian group led by the Whites, Joseph Bates and others sought out the scattered Millerites and presented their Sabbath understanding to them. In the early 1850s Joseph Bates and Hiram Edson traveled along the northern shore of Lake Ontario trudging through knee-deep snow seeking out the Millerites. Thirty years later, the Adventist presence in Canada was still in its nascent stage. The first Seventh-day Adventist church in Canada was at South Stukely, Quebec. It organized on September 30, 1877, with 16 members.

=== Organizational history ===
==== Canadian Union Conference ====
In 1901, the Seventh-day Adventist Church created mid-level administrative units called union conferences that assumed oversight of the local conferences from the General Conference.

One result was the Eastern Union Conference consisting of local conferences in eastern United States and Canada. At its first meeting later that year, the delegates voted to create, effective 1 January 1902, a Canadian Union Conference consisting of only the provinces of Ontario, Quebec, the Maritimes and the territory of Newfoundland. The new union conference continued to be known as the Canadian Union Conference until 1914 even after the Western Canadian Union Conference emerged in 1907.

Meanwhile, Adventist entities in western Canada came under the jurisdiction of union conferences located in western United States. For example, in 1902, the Pacific Union Conference recommended that Adventist churches in British Columbia be organized into their own local conference within the Pacific Union.

==== Western Canadian Union Conference ====
In 1907, president of the General Conference, A. G. Daniells, visited the western Canadian provinces and urged Adventists there to establish a "western Canadian Union Conference." Later that year, it became a reality.

==== Eastern Canadian Union Conference ====
In 1914, the church organization in eastern Canada finally became identified with its territorial limits as the Eastern Canadian Union Conference. At the beginning of the next year it hosted a visit by W. C. White, son of Ellen White, who urged immediate expansion of church outreach within its regions.

==== Canadian Union Conference / Seventh-day Adventist Church in Canada ====
To address the impact of the Great Depression on the financial position of the church in Canada, the General Conference Annual Council (1931) recommended that the two Canadian union conferences be merged to serve all of Canada and Newfoundland. In 1932, delegates representing east and west voted to establish one union conference. They also recommended merging the Manitoba and Saskatchewan conferences and the Ontario and St. Lawrence conferences. Headquarters of the new union conference were in Winnipeg.

The unincorporated union conference and its corresponding legal association were combined in 1986 to form the Seventh-day Adventist Church in Canada, a non-profit religious corporation.

== Social and political engagement ==
The SDACC has been engaged in social and political activities throughout its history.

=== Social engagement ===
Like Adventists everywhere and throughout their history, individuals and entities of the SDACC have been engaged in promoting healthful living and operating healthcare facilities. These efforts have included the former Branson Hospital (Toronto), facilities for seniors in New Brunswick, Ontario, Manitoba, Saskatchewan, Alberta, and British Columbia.

Since 1990, the SDACC, in association with about thirty faith communities, has been a member of the Canadian Foodgrains Bank.

=== Political engagement ===
In 1906, Adventists in Canada opposed the efforts of the Lord's Day Alliance and others in promoting a Sunday-observance bill in parliament. In the process, Adventist leaders met with Prime Minister Wilfrid Laurier and his Minister of Justice.

In related areas of interest, Canadian Adventists, who were sometimes arrested for working on Sunday, supported the efforts of John G. Diefenbaker and others in advocating for a Canadian Bill of Rights.

== Membership statistics ==
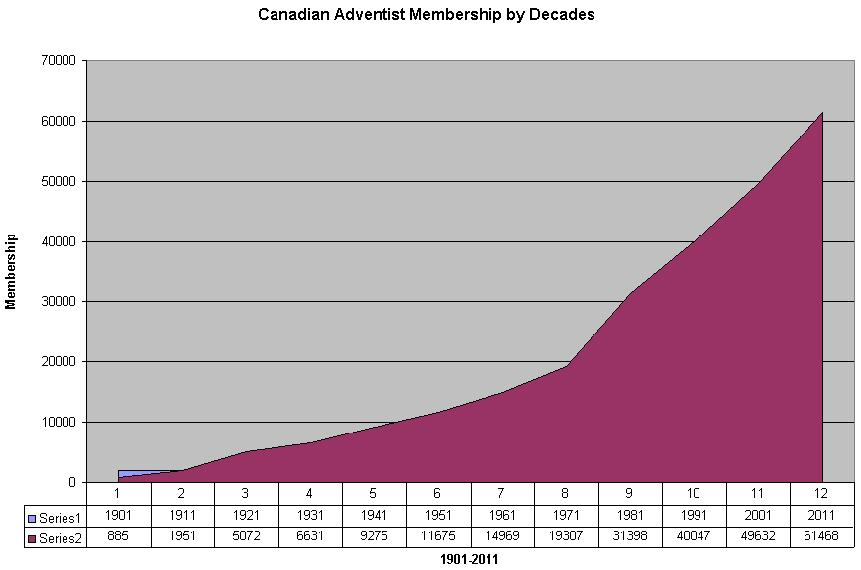

== Leadership: presidents of the SDACC and its predecessors ==
=== Canadian Union Conference ===
- W. H. Thurston, 1901–1909
- William Guthrie, 1909–1912
- M. N. Campbell, 1912–1914

=== Western Canadian Union Conrference ===
- E. L. Stewart, 1907-1909
- H. S. Shaw, 1910-1916
- C. F. McVagh, 1916-1919
- A. C. Gilbert, 1920-1924
- S. A. Ruskjer, 1925-1932

=== Eastern Canadian Union Conference ===
- M. N. Campbell, 1914-1917
- A. V. Olson, 1917–1920
- F. W. Stray, 1920–1923
- Charles F. McVagh, 1923–1928
- W. C. Moffett, 1928–1932

=== Seventh-day Adventist Church of Canada ===
The Eastern and Western Canadian Union Conferences merged in 1932 to form the Canadian Union Conference of Seventh-day Adventists, an unincorporated religious association. In 1986, The union conference and its corresponding legal association were combined to form the Seventh-day Adventist Church in Canada, a non-profit religious corporation.

- M. N. Campbell, 1932–1936
- W. B. Ochs, 1936–1943
- H. L. Rudy, 1943–1950
- W. A. Nelson, 1950–1962
- J. William Bothe, 1962–1973
- L. L. Reile, 1973–1981
- James W. Wilson, 1981–1989
- Douglas D. Devnich, 1989–1993
- Orville Parchment, 1994–2001
- Daniel R. Jackson, 2002–2010
- Mark A. Johnson, 2010–2022
- Paul Llewellyn, 2022–present

== Related national organizations ==
- Canadian Adventist Messenger
- Adventist Development and Relief Agency (ADRA)
- Burman University
- Kingsway College
- VOAR - Voice of Adventist Radio
- Christian Record Services for the Blind
- It Is Written Canada
- Voice of Prophecy

== Local conferences ==
The SDACC includes seven subdivisions ("local conferences").

=== Alberta Conference ===
The Alberta Conference, organized in 1906, with sixty-eight churches and 12,338 members serves a population of c. 4.5 million in the Province of Alberta and part of the Northwest Territories. Under the leadership of President Jeff Potts, the conference operates four schools (Chinook Winds Adventist Academy, Coralwood Academy, Mamawi Atosketan Native School, and Prairie Adventist Christian eSchool) and Foothills Seventh-day Adventist Camp (used for camp meetings and youth camps).

=== British Columbia Conference ===
The British Columbia Conference, organized in 1906, with eighty-one churches and 10,793 members serves a population of c. 5.4 million in the Province of British Columbia, the Yukon Territory, and part of the Northwest Territories. Under the leadership of President Brad Thorp, the conference operates six schools (Cariboo Adventist Academy, Deer Lake Seventh-day Adventist School, Fraser Valley Adventist Academy, Okanagan Christian School, Peace Christian School, and West Coast Adventist Christian School), Camp Hope (used for camp meetings), and Mountain View Summer Camp (used for youth camps).

=== Manitoba-Saskatchewan Conference ===
The Manitoba-Saskatchewan Conference, organized in 1903, with thirty-five churches and 4,074 members serves a population of c. 2.6 million in the Provinces of Manitoba and Saskatchewan and the Nunavut Territory. Under the leadership of President Charles Ed Aguilar II, the conference operates Camp Whitesand (used for camp meetings and youth camps).

=== Maritime Conference of the Seventh-day Adventist Church, Inc. ===
The Maritime Conference Conference, organized in 1902, with twenty-seven churches and 1,795 members serves a population of c. 2 million in the Provinces of New Brunswick, Nova Scotia, and Prince Edward Island. Under the leadership of President David Miller, the conference operates one school (Sandy Lake Academy) and Camp Pugwash (used for camp meetings and youth camps).

=== Seventh-day Adventist Church in Newfoundland and Labrador ===
The SDA Church in Newfoundland and Labrador, organized in 1895, with eight churches and 503 members serves a population of c. 0.5 million in the Province of Newfoundland and Labrador. Under the leadership of President Ken Corkum, the conference operates a radio station (Lighthouse FM [VOAR-FM 96.7]) and Woody Acres Camp (used for camp meetings and youth camps).

=== Ontario Conference ===
The Ontario Conference, organized in 1899, with 133 churches and 35,517 members serves a population of c. 15 million in the Province of Ontario. Under the leadership of President Mansfield Edwards, the conference operates one school (Crawford Adventist Academy) and Camp Frenda (used for youth camps).

=== Quebec Conference ===
The Quebec Conference, organized in 1880, with forty-two churches and 9,171 members serves a population of c. 8.7 million in the Province of Quebec and the French possessions of Saint Pierre and Miquelon. Under the leadership of President Ngoy Kyala, the conference operates one media facility (Il Est Ecrit [It Is Written]).

== See also ==
- Seventh-day Adventist Church
- North American Division of Seventh-day Adventists
- It Is Written
