= Henry Dana Ward =

American preacher (1797–1884)

Henry Dana Ward (January 13, 1797 – February 28, 1884) was an American preacher, abolitionist, anti-Masonic campaigner, and Millerite Adventist.

== Early life ==
Ward was born in 1797 in Shrewsbury, Massachusetts to Thomas and Elizabeth Ward. He was one of nine children and was a grandson of the Revolutionary general Artemas Ward.

He graduated from Harvard with an A.B. in 1816 and an A.M. in 1819. He was ordained as an Episcopal minister and served a parish in Virginia.

Ward briefly joined the Freemasons in the 1820s. He later published a book renouncing the fraternity.

== Millerite movement ==
On November 15, 1833, Ward published an article in the Journal of Commerce entitled "The Falling Stars". He stated that according to Matthew 24:29, the meteor storm that had appeared two days before was a sign that Christ was returning soon. Ward then studied biblical prophecies of the Second Coming and published his conclusions in an 1838 essay entitled Glad Tidings. William Miller was preaching a similar message and the two joined together with Henry Jones, Josiah Litch, Charles Fitch, and Joshua V. Himes to create the Second Advent Movement.

Ward chaired the first meeting of the Movement on October 14, 1840 in Boston. His speech was entitled History and Doctrine of the Millennium where he shared the Millerite belief in a premillennial second advent which would soon arrive. This contrasted with the mainstream postmillennial view which saw the advent as happening in the distant future, after the millennium. He saw the new movement as link to the line of believers including Adam, Abraham, David, St Paul, Luther and Melanchthon, transcending boundaries of nation and race.

Ward believed that the Daniel showed that "the kingdom of heaven" would come "from heaven with its king," and would rule "over all the earth for ever and ever;" and it was "yet to come." He saw that the 2300-days of Daniel 8:14 were to be understood as years, and these years were nearly completed. At that time, he believed, the stone "from on high," depicted in Daniel 2, would strike "the image" of earthly empires and destroy it. He stated that the arrival of the kingdom would only occur after Christ finished his ministry as priest in heaven, which Ward saw as distinct from Christ's roles as prophet and king.

Ward did not believe that God intended for people to know the exact date of the Second Advent, but wanted people to be constantly on watch. Other members of the movements made attempts to calculate a specific date. As time went on, there was tension between members of the movement as they disagreed on the importance of setting a date. In May 1842, the movement passed a resolution declaring that "God has revealed the time for the end of the world and that time is 1843". After the conference, Ward stepped back from the movement and eventually left.

== Personal life ==
Ward was married twice. His first wife, Abigail Porter Jones, died in 1837 in New York City. He then married Charlotte Galbraith in 1842 in Charleston, West Virginia and they had four children. They moved to New York City and they founded a girls' school.

He retired with his family to Philadelphia and died in February 28, 1884.

Ward wrote several publications, including Free Masonry: Its Pretensions Exposed in Faithful Extracts of Its Standard Authors (1828) and other monographs.

== Works ==
- Free Masonry: Its Pretensions Exposed in Faithful Extracts of Its Standard Authors. 1828
- Anti-masonic review, 1828
- Glad tidings: for the kingdom of heaven is at hand. 1838
- History and doctrine of the millennium : a discourse delivered in the conference on the second Advent near, at Boston, Mass., Oct. 14, 1840
- Kingdom, not of this world, not in this world. 1868
- The gospel of the Kingdom; a Kingdom not of this world; not in this world; but to come in the heavenly country, of the resurrection from the dead and of the restitution of all things. 1870
- History of the cross: the pagan origin, and idolatrous adoption and worship, of the image. 1871
- Faith of Abraham and of Christ his seed in the coming kingdom of God on earth, with the restitution of all things which God hath spoken. 1872
- The gospel of the kingdom : a kingdom not of this world, not in this world, but to come in the heavenly country. 1874
- The gospel of the Kingdom of God a Kingdom not of this world, not in this world but in the habitable world to come, with Jesus and the resurrection. 1874
