= Josiah Litch =

American methodist (1809–1886)

- Josiah Litch
- Born: April 4, 1809; Lunenburg, Massachusetts
- Died: January 31, 1886 (aged 76); Providence, Rhode Island
- Occupations: Minister, Periodical Editor, Physician
- Spouse: Sarah Barstow
- Children: Wilbur Fisk Litch, Josiah Lincoln Litch

Josiah Litch (April 4, 1809 – January 31, 1886) was a Methodist Episcopal preacher in the New England region of the United States, who was best known for his connections with the Millerite movement, and for using Bible prophecy to predict a loss of power for the Ottoman Empire.

== Biography ==
=== Early life and ministry ===
Josiah Litch was born April 4, 1809, in Lunenburg, Massachusetts. His parents' names were John and Jerusha (Lincoln) Litch, and on his mother's side, he was a descendant of Samuel Lincoln. He attended Wesleyan Academy at Wilbraham and joined the Methodist Episcopal ministry as an itinerant minister in 1833.

Litch spent his itinerant ministry traveling through Cape Cod and Rhode Island. He left the Methodist Episcopal ministry in 1841 to join the Millerites.

=== Family ===
Litch intended to marry Sarah Barstow on April 25, 1836. Sarah's father, William Barstow, was a fellow minister with the New England Conference of the Methodist Episcopal church. Josiah and Sarah had two children who survived to adulthood, Wilbur Fisk Litch, and Josiah Lincoln Litch.

=== Millerism ===
In 1838, a friend asked Josiah Litch to read the writings of William Miller. Litch at first was hostile to Miller's prediction of the second coming of Jesus, but after reading he was converted into the Millerite movement.

Litch then wrote his own book, The Probability of the Second Coming of Christ About A.D. 1843. In a comment on Revelation 9, Litch predicted that the Ottoman Empire would lose power in August 1840. When on August 11, 1840, the Ottoman Empire accepted guarantees from the Great Powers, it was interpreted as a fulfillment of Bible prophecy and Litch's interpretation thereof.

Litch was responsible for inviting Charles Fitch to reconsider his rejection of Miller's teachings. Fitch later became one of the foremost preachers in the Millerite movement.

Around 1841, the Millerite movement requested Litch to become the first general agent. Litch was granted release from his pastoral duties, and became the first paid Millerite worker. Litch was successful as a promoter and secretary for the movement.

Another idea that Litch developed was the idea of a pre-advent judgment. According to Litch, "no human tribunal would think of executing judgment on a prisoner until after his trial; much less God." He began to develop the idea in 1840, but didn't publish until 1841. After the Great Disappointment, some Millerites applied Litch's pre-advent judgment to October 22, 1844, the Millerites' predicted date of Jesus' return. The Seventh-day Adventists later developed this into the "investigative judgment" doctrine.

Litch was among the last of the prominent Millerites to accept the date of October 22, 1844, proposed by Samuel S. Snow, as the anticipated date of Jesus' return.

=== Beyond 1844 ===
After the Great Disappointment, Litch first thought there was some misunderstanding with regard to what happened in 1844. In 1845, he was present at the Albany Conference where the Millerites who were opposed to the shut-door doctrine met to work out the meaning of the Great Disappointment, and determine the future of the movement.

Litch eventually worked with the Evangelical Adventists, and served as president of the American Millennial Association. He formed his own organization known as the Messianians, and served as president in both Pennsylvania, and Canada.

Litch slowly abandoned the historicist view of prophecy, in favor of futurism. He attended the Prophetic Conference held at the Church of Holy Trinity, in New York City, Oct. 30–Nov. 1, 1878.

Litch died January 31, 1886.

== See also ==
- Millerism
- Adventism

== Sources ==
- Knight, George R. (1999). A Brief History of Seventh-day Adventism. Hagerstown, MD: Review and Herald. ISBN 0-8280-1430-2.
- Knight, George R. (2000). A Search for Identity: The Development of Seventh-day Adventist Beliefs. Hagerstown, MD: Review and Herald Publishing Association. ISBN 0-8280-1541-4.
- Schwarz, Richard W.; Greenleaf, Floyd (1979). Light Bearers: A History of the Seventh-day Adventist Church. Nampa, ID: Pacific Press. ISBN 0-8163-1795-X.
- Letter to Rev. J. Litch, on the Second Coming of Christ by Charles Fitch (1841)
- Lest We Forget 4th Quarter, 1993 Adventist Pioneer Library, vol. 3, no. 4
