= William Miller Farm =

- William Miller Farm Historic District
- U.S. National Register of Historic Places
- U.S. Historic district
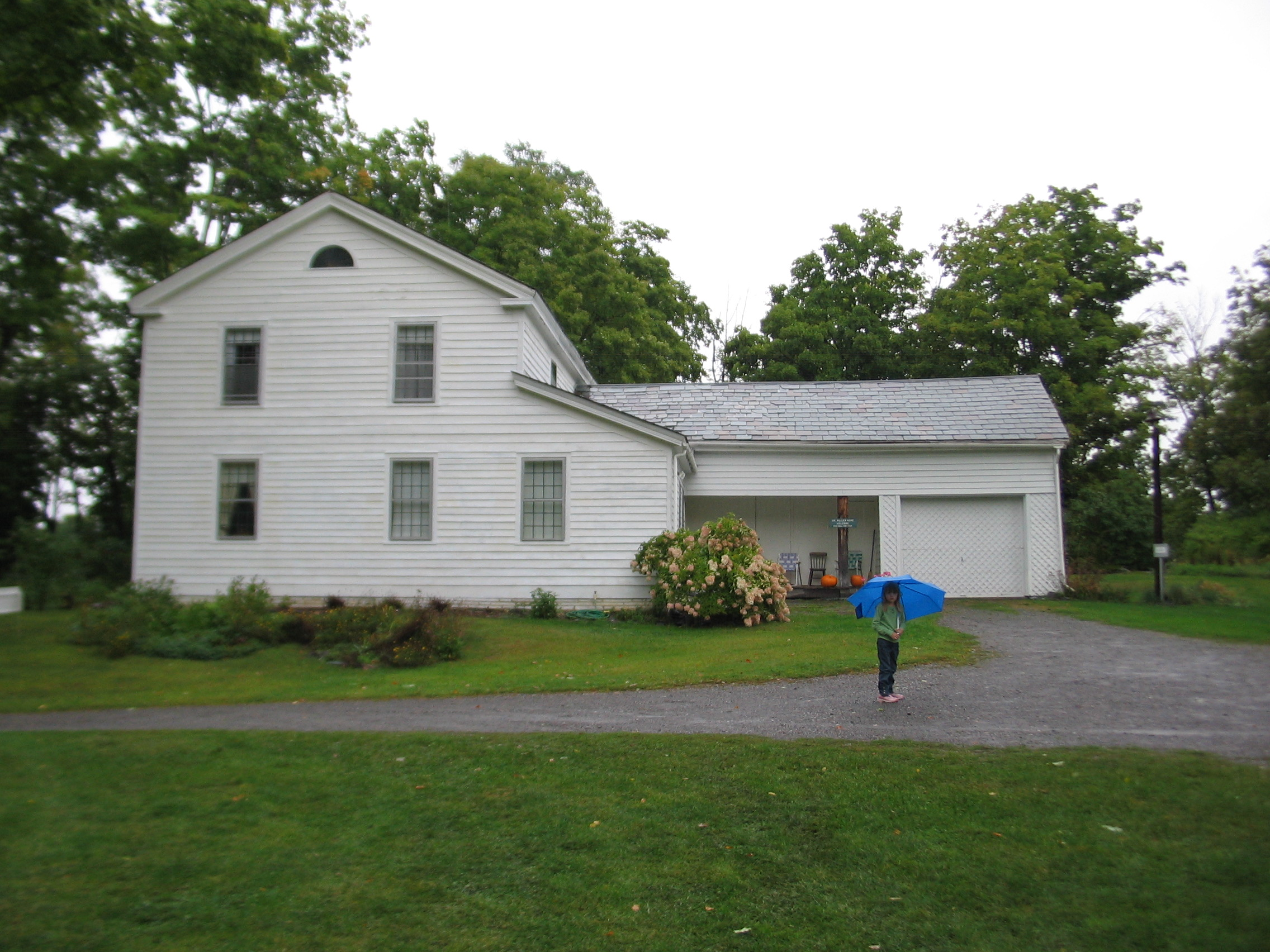
- William Miller's home

- Location within New York Location within the United States
- Location: County Road 11, Hampton, New York
- Coordinates: 43°35′42″N 73°18′45″W
- Area: 25 acres (10 ha)
- Built: 1815
- Architectural style: Greek Revival
- NRHP reference No.: 75001233 (original); 94000256 (increase)

Significant dates
- Added to NRHP: July 17, 1975
- Boundary increase: April 4, 1994

The William Miller Farm is a historic farm property on County Road 11 in Hampton, New York. It is a historic district that encompasses the home of William Miller, who was a Baptist preacher credited with beginning the mid-nineteenth century North American religious movement that was known as the Millerites. After his prophetic interpretations did not happen as he expected, new heirs of his message emerged, including Seventh-day Adventists and Advent Christians. Later movements found inspiration in Miller's emphasis on Bible prophecy. The property includes Miller's farmhouse, a chapel he built for Adventist worship, and Ascension Rock, the place where some of his followers gathered to await the Second Advent on October 22, 1844.

The chapel and Ascension Rock were listed on the National Register of Historic Places in 1975 as William Miller Chapel and Ascension Rock. The historic district's boundaries were increased in 1994 to include Miller's farmhouse and a portion of his agricultural properties.

== Gallery ==
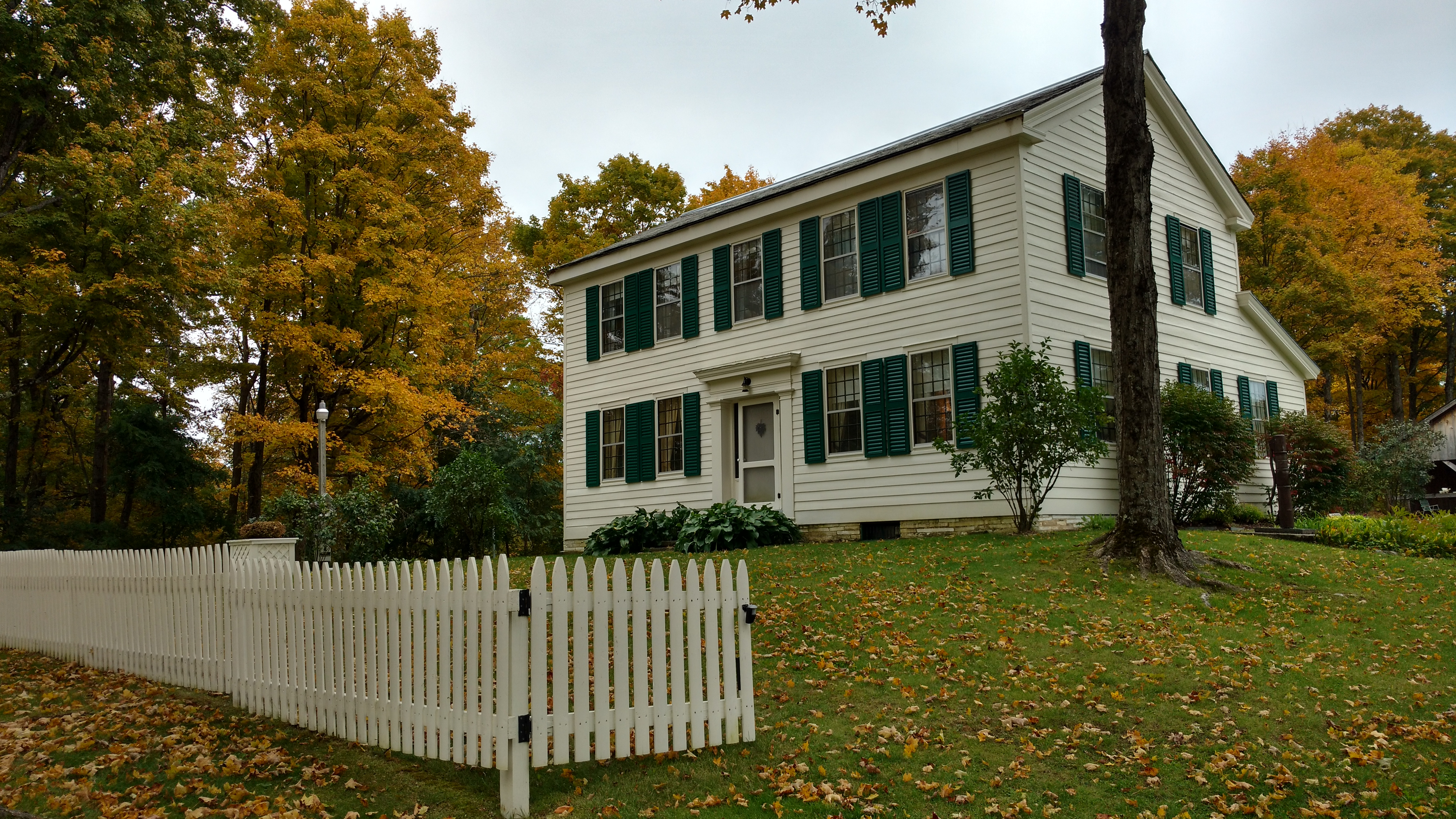
William Miller's home built in 1815 newly painted with original coloring.

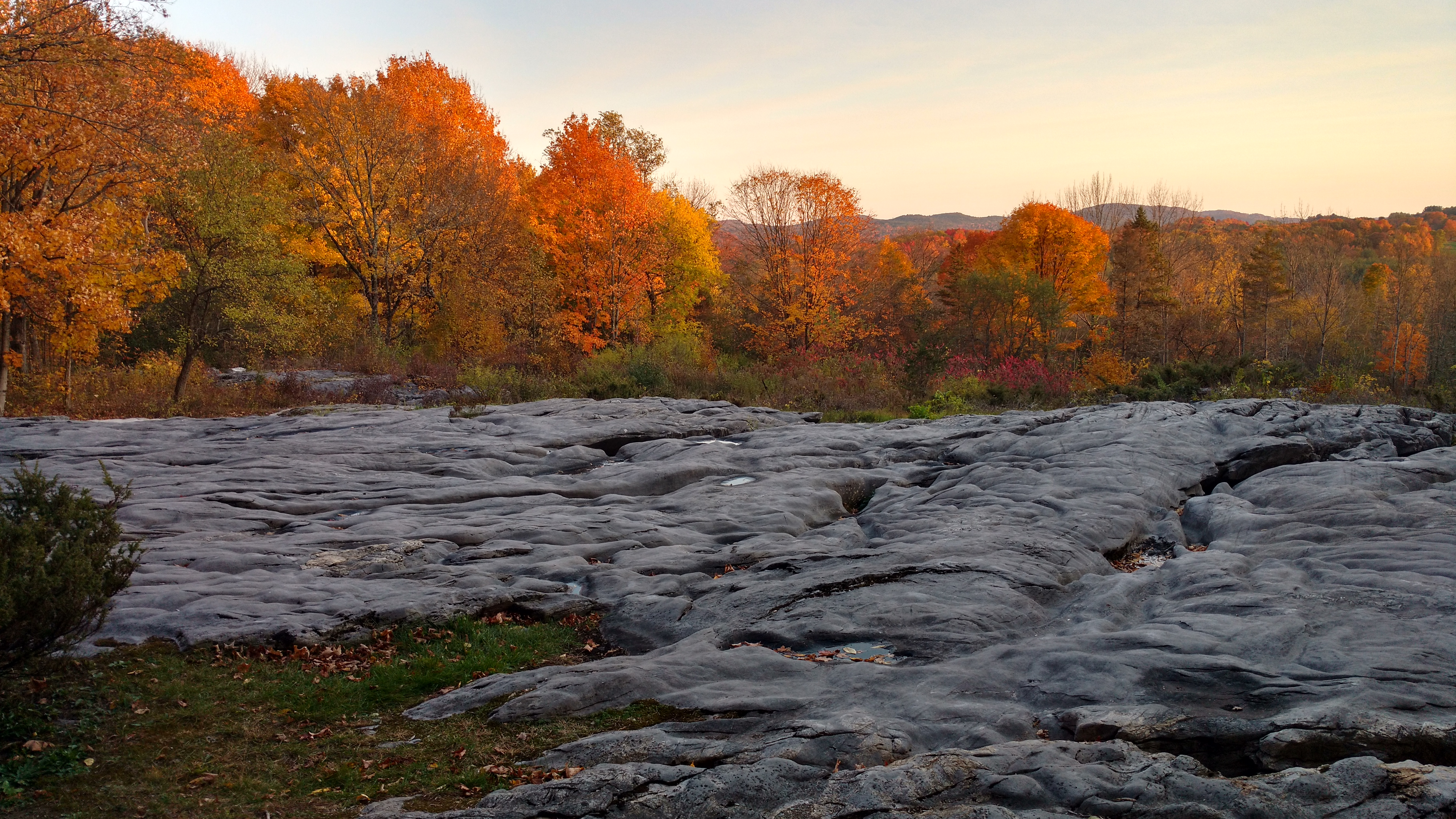
A unique limestone outcropping on the property where it is said that a group gathered to witness the Second Coming of Christ on October 22, 1844

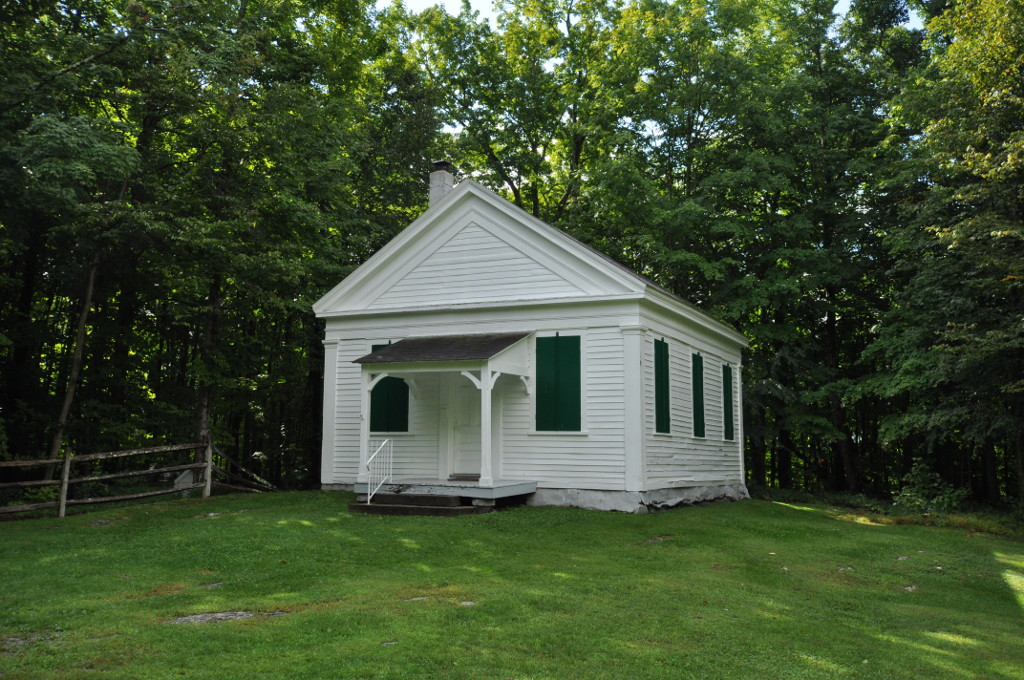
The chapel
