= Charles Fitch =

American preacher

Charles Fitch (1805–1844) was an American preacher in the early 19th century, who rose to prominence for his work with the Millerite movement.

During his early years, in the 1830s, he had associated with famous evangelist Charles G. Finney, and worked with him on the causes of temperance and abolition. In 1838, he found some copies of William Miller's lectures, and accepted them at once. However, when he went to share them with local colleagues, he was rebuffed, and so he backed off.

Three years later, after meeting with Josiah Litch, he openly accepted the Millerite movement, and became one of its foremost preachers. While the core of the Millerite movement was in New England, Fitch focused his efforts on Ohio, Michigan, and Western New York.

== Come Out of Babylon ==
Fitch's most notable contribution to Millerism came in the summer of 1843. At the time the public sentiment had begun to turn against the Millerites, and many preachers and believers were faced with expulsion from their churches. But up to this point, William Miller had advised his followers not to separate from their churches.

Charles Fitch then preached a powerful sermon based on Revelation 18: "Babylon the great has fallen... Come out of her, my people!" Up to this point, most Protestants had identified Babylon in the text as the papacy of the Roman Catholic Church. In this sermon, Fitch labeled all the Protestant churches that had not accepted the message of Jesus' Second Coming as Babylon. He then invited the Millerites to separate from their churches.

This cry was taken up by George Storrs, who cautioned the Millerites not to organize a new church, for "no church can be organized by man's invention but what it becomes Babylon the moment it is organized". Joseph Marsh, editor of the Voice of Truth, also supported this call to separate. The Millerite leaders themselves withheld from supporting this call, but neither did they do anything to prevent it.

== Final year ==
After the first initial disappointment that occurred when Jesus did not come by the spring of 1844, Fitch then traveled east to continue evangelizing.

In August 1844, Samuel S. Snow reinvigorated the Millerite movement by predicting that Jesus would come on October 22, 1844.

Charles Fitch continued to preach and baptize, even into the colder autumn months, and in early October after baptizing three groups of believers in a brisk wind, he contracted a high fever and died on October 14, 1844, just eight days before he expected Jesus to come. He was 39 years old.
