= Samuel Snow =

Samuel Snow may refer to:

- Samuel Snow (cricketer) (1880–1931), cricketer for British Guiana and Jamaica
- Samuel S. Snow (1806–1890), skeptic turned Millerite preacher
- Samuel Sussman Snow (1818–1892), settler, doctor, gold miner, and rancher in California
- Samuel Snow (diplomat) (1758–1838), United States Consul in Canton and Consular Agent of Russia in Providence
