= Shut-door theology =

Shut-door theology was a belief held by the Millerite group from 1844 to approximately 1854, some of whom later formed into the Seventh-day Adventist Church. It held that as William Miller had given the final call for salvation, all who did not accept his message were lost. The door of salvation was shut, hence the term "shut door". They later understood it was concerning the sanctuary and not the events on earth so abandoned their earlier understanding. As an interpretation of the year "1844", it was connected to the investigative judgment belief, which forms one of the official 28 Fundamentals beliefs today.

== History ==
After the disappointment of 1844, the Millerites held a Conference in 1845 in Albany, attended by 61 delegates, to determine the future course and meaning of the Millerite movement. Following this meeting, the "Millerites" then became known as "Adventists" or "Second Adventists". Four groups emerged from the conference: The Evangelical Adventists, The Life and Advent Union, the Advent Christian Church, and the Seventh-day Adventist Church.

The largest group organized as the American Millennial Association, a portion of which was later known as the Evangelical Adventist Church. Unique among the Adventists, they believed in an eternal hell and consciousness in death. The Life and Advent Union was founded by George Storrs in the year of 1863. He had established The Bible Examiner in 1842. The Advent Christian Church officially formed in 1861. The Seventh-day Adventist Church officially formed in 1863, so they still were known as Millerites or as "Adventists" or "Second Adventists" till they organized.

When Jesus did not arrive the Millerites who held to the 'Shut door' belief felt there was something which had to explain the delay. The understanding of the investigative judgment was given after the Great Disappointment when Hiram Edson, after a night of prayer, had "an impression or a vision" that explained why Jesus had not come: the sanctuary needed to be cleansed and a review of the records in heaven needed to be completed before Christ would appear. Those Millerites believing in the Shut door theory did not believe it necessary or possible to reach out to the lost, who had rejected Miller's final call. Salvation was only open to those who had accepted the message of William Miller.

The groundwork for the theory came from a William Miller quote published in the December 11, 1844 Advent Herald: "We have done our work in warning sinners, and in trying to awake a formal church. God, in his providence has shut the door; and we can only stir one another up to be patient; and be diligent to make our calling and election sure."

In January 1845, editors Apollos Hale of the Advent Herald and Joseph Turner of The Hope of Israel further developed this thought, eventually coming to believe that on October 22, 1844, every man's destiny was forever sealed, using Revelation 22:11,12 as their basis. The term "shut door" came from Jesus' parable of the Bridegroom and the Virgins: "and they that were ready went in with him to the marriage: and the door was shut." (Matthew 25:10) The Adventists believed that Jesus' return was imminent.

An early title the Millerites or Sabbatarian Adventists (who would become the Seventh-day Adventist Church) used for themselves was the "Sabbath and Shut Door Adventists".

Ellen White early on in her ministry supported the belief in the Shut door as most Millerites. Despite her earlier belief, beginning in November 1848, she had a vision in which she saw the Three Angels' Messages "like streams of light... clear round the world." As the Millerite movement had not been significantly multinational, her vision clearly showed that new converts could be made to the movement.

In an 1849 vision, White heard Christ tell her that the door that had been shut was the door to the Holy Place of the Heavenly Sanctuary. However, many of the Millerites or Sabbatarian Adventists were just hearing of and unsure of Ellen White's prophetic status, and did not accept the visions as a divinely inspired denouncement of shut-door theory.

Gradually, individuals who had no prior connection with Adventism converted to the church and by 1854, religious leaders and most Adventists were ready to accept that the shut-door theory was not correct understanding.

== Later and recent commentary ==
Ellen White was later questioned over her beliefs, and whether she had received them in vision. She denied the latter, writing in 1874:

"With my brethren and sisters, after the time passed in forty-four I did believe no more sinners would be converted. But I never had a vision that no more sinners would be converted."

Robert W. Olson's 1982 compilation "The 'Shut Door' Documents" (see below) was a major step, convincing many that Millerites and early Adventists had indeed held this belief. Olson concluded, "While Ellen White's personal beliefs underwent a gradual modification during this period, I find no evidence that she at any time taught theological error in her shut door writings." Similarly, Herbert E. Douglass has argued that White simply used similar language to reach her peers in their context.

Graeme Bradford defends, "Some would argue that this teaching is an embarrassment to the Seventh-day Adventist Church today. Those who use such an argument should be reminded of the fact that a similar 'Shut Door teaching' was applied by early Christians (including Peter) for the first 10 years of the existence of the newly formed Christian Church. For the first 10 years they only preached to the Jews as being worthy of God's grace. That is the purpose of the vision given by God to Peter in Acts 10:9–34. All movements raised up by God still have the imperfections common to humanity."

== See also ==
- Adventism
- History of the Seventh-day Adventist Church
- Inspiration of Ellen White
- Seventh-day Adventist theology
