= T. M. Preble =

Thomas Motherwell Preble (1810–1907) was a Free Will Baptist minister in New Hampshire and a Millerite preacher. After accepting the teachings of William Miller, Preble was excommunicated from his church.

Preble appears to have accepted the seventh-day Sabbath in 1844, possibly from Frederick Wheeler or someone associated with the Washington, New Hampshire, church. Preble was the first Millerite to advocate the Sabbath in print. In the Feb. 28, 1845, issue of the Hope of Israel, an Adventist periodical in Portland, Maine, was reprinted in tract form in March, 1845, with the title, Tract, Showing That the Seventh Day Should be Observed as the Sabbath. This tract led to the conversion of J. N. Andrews and other Adventist families in Paris, Maine, as well as to Joseph Bates.

Two years later, however, Preble repudiated the Sabbath and later wrote some articles against the Seventh-Day Sabbath in The World's Crisis and a book, entitled First-Day Sabbath.

== Family History ==
Preble's great-grandparents were massacred by Natives in 1758 in Woolwich, Maine. Their children, among whom was Preble's grandfather, Ebenezer Preble Jr., were captured and sold to the French in Quebec, Canada, from where they were later found and brought back by their maternal grandfather. Preble's father, Motherwell Preble, was named after Thomas Motherwell, who married Rebecca Preble, the sister of Ebenezer Preble Jr. and who was also captured by the Indians.

== See also ==
- Millerites
- The Seventh-day Adventist Encyclopedia, 1996 ed., has a helpful biographical entry on T. M. Preble.
- Ellen G. White Estate's Legacy of Light CD-ROM.
