= Apollos Hale =

American Methodist Episcopal preacher

Apollos Hale (1807–1898) was a Methodist Episcopal preacher in New England. He joined the Millerites and contributed significantly as a lecturer, a writer, and co-designer of the widely disseminated "1843 chart". Following the Great Disappointment, he adopted the shut-door doctrine at first, along with Joseph Turner. Later he abandoned this interpretation.

== Biography ==
Hale began his work as a Methodist Episcopal minister in Charleston and Medford, Massachusetts, in 1833. He married Rebecca Wait in December, 1836. He left the Methodist Episcopal ministry in 1842.

Hale spent the last years of his life in Washington, D.C., where he died.

== Millerism ==
Apollos Hale was instrumental in designing and presenting the "1843 chart" that was used extensively by Millerite lecturers. Hale also served as an associate editor for the Signs of the Times, and later when it became the Advent Herald, he continued in the same responsibility. He also authored the first three chapters of William Miller's Memoirs.

In January, 1845, Hale and Joseph Turner published an interpretation of what had happened on October 22, 1844, in which they articulated what became known as the shut-door doctrine. This was a minority view among the Millerites following the Great Disappointment, and Hale eventually abandoned the shut-door view and joined the majority group.
