= Crawford Adventist Academy =

Coordinates: 43.771621°N 79.444923°W

- Toronto M2R 3X2; Canada

Information
- Type: Private
- Motto: "Excellence In Christian Education"
- Religious affiliation: Seventh-day Adventist Church
- Established: 1953
- Principal: Andon Boyce
- Principal: Lauren Chichester
- Principal: Rose Wilson
- Principal: Wendy Hutchinson
- Grades: K - 12 Academy
- Accreditation: Adventist Accrediting Association
- Website: https://www.caasda.com

Crawford Adventist Academy is a K– grade 12 Adventist private day-school in Toronto, Ontario, Canada. The school is divided into two sections, the elementary, which consists of grades JK-8, and the high school, which consists of grades 9-12. The campus is located next to the 1000+ member Willowdale Seventh-day Adventist Church, and the previously SDA-owned North York General Hospital Branson Site. Owned and operated by the Seventh-day Adventist Church, Crawford maintains three campuses – the main school in the north part of Toronto, a second K–8 campus called Crawford East and a campus in Peel Region. Crawford has over 700 students overall.

Crawford Adventist Academy Toronto Campus is the centrepiece of the Toronto Adventist District School Board (TADSB), which also runs the third school called Peel Adventist School. The TADSB is under the jurisdiction of the Ontario Conference of Seventh-day Adventists.

== History ==
Crawford Adventist Academy (CAA) began in 1953. At that time, it was located in a church at the corner of Church Street and Yonge Street. It was called Willowdale SDA church school. When it moved to the 555 Finch Avenue Campus, it became Toronto Junior Academy. It grew from Toronto Junior Academy to Crawford Adventist Academy and has provided a full grade 12 program since the early 1980s. Since then, it has been considered one of the Seventh-day Adventist Church's major educational endeavours in Canada.

== Curriculum ==
Crawford Adventist Academy offers religious education along with the prescribed Ontario curriculum.

== See also ==
- List of Seventh-day Adventist secondary schools
- Seventh-day Adventist education
- Seventh-day Adventist Church in Canada
