= Jonathan L. Friedmann =

Jonathan L. Friedmann (born in 1980) is a scholar of Jewish music and history as well as a cantor. He is a professor of Jewish Music History at the Academy for Jewish Religion California and Associate Dean of its Jewish Studies Program. He is also president of the Western States Jewish History Association and director of the Jewish Museum of the American West. He has written and edited books about Judaism, music, religion, and history including as collections of essays, writings, and quotations.

He wrote the 2020 book Jewish Gold Country about Jewish pioneers in California from the gold rush era. It is part of the Images of America series and includes numerous photographs.

== Bibliography ==
- Jewish Sacred Music and Jewish Identity: Continuity and Fragmentation with Brad Stetson (2008)
- Social Functions of Synagogue Song: A Durkhimian Approach (thesis) (2010)
- Musical Aesthetics: An Introduction to Concepts, Theories, and Functions
- Songs of Sonderling: Commissioning Jewish Émigré Composers in Los Angeles, 1938-1945 with John F. Guest and foreword by Nick Strimple
- Jewish Sacred Music and Jewish Identity: Continuity and Fragmentation ISBN 9781557788726
- Music in Jewish Thought: Selected Writings, 1890–1920, collection of essays, Jefferson, North Carolina: McFarland & Company, (2008) ISBN 978-0-7864-4439-7
- The Value of Sacred Music: An Anthology of Essential Writings, 1801–1918 Jefferson, North Carolina: McFarland & Company (2008) ISBN 978-0-7864-4201-0
- Perspectives on Jewish Music: Secular and Sacred, editor. Lanham, Maryland: Lexington Books, (2009) ISBN 978-0-7391-4152-6
- Quotations on Jewish Sacred Music, (editor). Hamilton Books (2011)
- Qol Tamid: The Shofar in Ritual, History, and Culture (with Joel D Gereboff, joint editor) .Claremont Press (2017) ISBN 9781946230249
- Emotions in Jewish music: personal and scholarly reflections. (editor) University Press of America (2012) ISBN 9780761856757
- Synagogue song : an introduction to concepts, theories and customs. McFarland, 2012 ISBN 9780786491360
- Music in the Hebrew Bible : understanding references in the Torah, Nevi'im and Ketuvim McFarland (2014)
- Music in our lives : why we listen, how it works McFarland (2015) ISBN 9780786497591
- Voices in the Wilderness: Emerging Roles of Israeli Clergywomen, co-editor with Meeka Simerly. Santa Fe:Gaon Books (2015) ISBN 9781935604679
- Jewish Los Angeles Charleston, SC : Arcadia Publishing, (2020) ISBN 9781467105491
- Jewish Gold Country Charleston, SC : Arcadia Publishing, (2020) ISBN 9781467104814
