= Sylvester Bliss =

American Millerite minister

Sylvester Bliss (1814–1863) was a Millerite minister, editor and author.

== Biography ==
Bliss was a Congregationalist from Hartford, Connecticut with a radical education. He also belonged to the Historical Society of Boston and was the Millerite leader in Boston, Massachusetts.

He wrote articles for the Millerite magazine Signs of the Times which helped him to get a job as an assistant editor in November 1842. He stayed at that position for many years and then became the only editor of the magazine which was renamed Advent Herald. Bliss held the position of editor until his death of natural causes in 1863. He was also editor of the Millerite magazine Advent Shield.

== See also ==
- Adventist
- Millerites
- William Miller (preacher)
