= Samuel Sussman Snow =

American settler

Samuel Sussman Snow (March 18, 1818 - July 9, 1892) was a pioneering settler, doctor, gold miner, and rancher in California. He was an immigrant and Jewish. He helped establish a synagogue and the Kewish Pioneer Cemetery in Placerville, California. Jonathan Friedmann wrote the 2020 book Jewish Gold Country about him and other Jewish pioneers in California. It recounts the tales of gold rush era pioneers. He married Paulina Fink.
