= United Sabbath-Day Adventist Church =

African American Christian denomination

The United Sabbath-Day Adventist Church is a small African American Christian denomination founded by James K. Humphrey.

== History ==
It formed in New York City as a breakaway from the Seventh-day Adventist Church in 1929–1930 over racial tensions between black and white people. Its beliefs remained similar to Seventh-day Adventists. At its peak in the 1930s the movement had 15 congregations and smaller "missions" throughout the United States and Jamaica. It began to decline in the same decade. As of 2007, a small number of people remain in a single congregation in New York City.

== See also ==
- North American Division of Seventh-day Adventists
