= Joshua V. Himes =

Christian leader, publisher, and promoter (1805–1895)

Joshua Vaughan Himes
- Himes c. 1885
- Born: Joshua Vaughan Himes; 19 May 1805; Wickford, Rhode Island
- Died: 27 July 1895 (aged 90); Elk Point, South Dakota
- Occupations: Pastor, activist, publicist/promoter
- Known for: Millerism, evangelical movement
- Spouse: Mary Thompson Handy
- Children: Joshua Vaughan Himes, John G. L. Himes, William Lloyd Garrison Himes, Edwin Thompson Himes

Joshua Vaughan Himes (19 May 1805 – 27 July 1895) was a Christian leader, publisher, and promoter of intellectual innovators and social reformists. He became involved with the followers of William Miller and later became a prominent leader in the Advent Christian Church (ACC).

== Early life ==
Himes was born in Wickford, Rhode Island, to Stuckeley Himes and Elizabeth Vaughn Himes. His parents intended for him to become an Episcopal priest, but when Himes was twelve, his father fell into financial ruin when a ship captain disappeared with a valuable cargo, leaving Stuckeley in immense debt. Himes, unable to afford his education in seminary, was then apprenticed to a cabinetmaker in New Bedford, Massachusetts.

In October 1824, Elizabeth filed for divorce from Himes' father (a court order stated that Stuckeley was now a "yeoman...residing in parts unknown").

== Entry into Ministry, Support of Progressive Social Reform/Intellectuals ==
At 18, Himes joined the Christian Connexion church in New Bedford where he was licensed as an exhorter (most likely, an initial level role—he could preach and pastor a church, but was not an ordained minister). In November 1825 he married Mary Thompson Handy, and the following year was ordained to the ministry. Over the next few years he pastored several districts in Massachusetts, before becoming pastor of the First Christian Church in Boston in 1830. There he rose to prominence, reviving a church that was near death, and becoming active in the educational, temperance, peace, and abolitionist reform movements of the day.

In 1836, he left First Christian Church (some scholars claim that he was forced out of his position because of his single-minded focus on social reform movements). With only sixteen members, he started a new gathering at Lyceum Hall on Hanover Street; two years later, they relocated to a new sanctuary that would become Chardon Street Chapel, dedicated on November 6, 1838. On November 29, 1842, when Himes resigned his position to John Starkweather, the total gathering was 410.

== Millerite Movement ==
Himes met William Miller twice before recruiting him: first, at a Christian Connexion Conference in Calais, Vermont; the second time, at Groton, Massachusetts in 1839, on a recommendation from David Cambell (who would later become an ardent critic of Miller's prophetic interpretation). Impressed by what he observed, or perhaps just aware of Miller's potential, Himes invited Miller to speak at Chardon Street Chapel in Boston. From these lectures, Himes became convinced of the imminent return of Christ, and sought opportunities for Miller to preach. In 1840 he published and edited the first Millerite newspaper, Signs of the Times, in Boston. He led in organizing general conferences and camp meetings, and published hundreds of pamphlets as well as the second and third editions of Miller's lectures. He organized extensive lecture tours for Miller and himself as far west as Cincinnati, brought about the manufacture of the "great tent," at that time the largest tent in the United States, for use on these tours, and established a network of agents, book depots, and reading rooms from Boston to St. Louis. He also published the Thayer lithograph of the first Millerite prophetic chart, designed by Charles Fitch and Apollos Hale.

Himes' promotional work brought Millerism to the attention of the world, stretching into Canada and England. In 1842 he started a second newspaper, the Midnight Cry, in New York City. He resigned as pastor of Chardon Street Chapel in November the same year and, as he focused his efforts on supporting Miller and his movement, reduced his efforts or removed entirely from his other social reform initiatives, including his support of William Lloyd Garrison and his abolitionist movement (Garrison still referred to him as "a sincere and worthy man," although he rejected the Millerite movement, stating that Himes had “become the victim of an absurd theory”).

Like Miller, Himes at first opposed the setting of October 22, 1844 as the exact date for the return of Christ, but accepted it shortly before the date arrived. The date passed without incident, and Himes and Miller were the subjects of intense scrutiny and accusations. Himes published his defense, first in The Boston Post, then in periodicals like The Liberator, refuting some of the more serious accusations made against him, the movement, and its impact on followers.

== Career following the Great Disappointment of 1844, Death ==
After the Great Disappointment, Himes played a leading role in trying to reorganize the disappointed Adventists around the original Advent faith at the Albany Conference held in April 1845. When this failed he became a leader of the Evangelical Adventist Church and their American Millennial Association (1858), opposing Sabbatarian Adventism and their understanding of the sanctuary as well as those who believed in conditional immortality and the re-establishment of Israel before Christ's Second Coming.

In 1863 Himes accepted the doctrine of conditional immortality, joined the Advent Christian Church, and moved his family to Buchanan, Michigan, assuming a prominent leadership role among Advent Christians and releasing a newspaper, The Voice of the West (later Advent Christian Times). In 1865 he was the founding president of the American Advent Mission Society, and was further planning to start a college in Illinois.

Himes died of cancer on July 27, 1895 in Elk Point. He was buried at Mount Pleasant Cemetery in Sioux Falls, South Dakota.

== See also ==
- Advent Christian Church
- Adventist, Millerites
- Second Coming
- Seventh-day Adventist Church
- Christian revival
- Christianity in the 19th century
- List of religions and religious denominations#Adventist and related churches
- List of Christian denominations#Millerites and comparable groups
- Other movements in Category:Adventism
- Great Disappointment
- William Miller (preacher)
- Millennialism
- Second Great Awakening
