= Handbook of Denominations =

Reference work on religious denominations

The Handbook of Denominations in the United States, also known as Abingdon's Handbook of Denominations or just the Handbook of Denominations, originally by Frank S. Mead, editor of the Christian Herald, is a reference work on religious denominations, particularly but not exclusively Christian ones, based in North America or extensively represented there (i.e., the Roman Catholic Church). The work is periodically updated to keep pace with changes in the groups chronicled and to document the formation of new groups. The first edition was published in 1951. Editors including Samuel S. Hill and Craig D. Atwood have taken over for Mead in later editions, Roger E. Olson took over as editor for the 14th edition in 2018.

Published by Abingdon Press, the Nashville, Tennessee-based United Methodist Publishing House, it is intended to be an authoritative guide to the history, polity, and doctrines of various religious groups. It has been called the "standard reference work for religious professionals" and "the gold standard for reference works about religious bodies in America."

The book was ranked 323rd most stocked book by OCLC in 2005.
