= George Storrs =

American christian teacher and writer

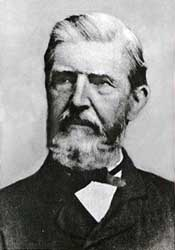
George Storrs

George Storrs (December 13, 1796 – December 28, 1879) was a Christian teacher and writer in the United States.

== Biography ==
George Storrs was born in Lebanon, New Hampshire on December 13, 1796, son to Colonel Constant Storrs (a wheelwright in the Revolutionary Army) and the former Lucinda Howe (his wife). A Congregationalist since age 19, George Storrs was received into the Methodist Episcopal Church and commenced preaching at age 28; by 1825, Storrs had joined their New Hampshire Conference. His biography notes, "Storrs, while a member of the New Hampshire Conference, was a strong man, able and influential in its councils, and the beloved pastor of several important churches."

Storrs also engaged in the debate over anti-slavery preaching by ministers. In his article, "Desecrating the Sabbath," he defended abolitionists from the charge they were desecrating the Sabbath by preaching against slavery from the pulpit. "I solemnly believe the Sabbath belongs, in a peculiar sense, to the slave," he wrote in the article, which was reprinted by the abolitionist newspaper, The Liberator.

In 1837, he found a copy of a pamphlet by Henry Grew on a train, concerning the doctrines of conditional immortality (the non-immortality of the soul), and hell. For three years he studied the issues on his own, only speaking about it to church ministers. However, in 1840 he finally resigned from the church, feeling he could not remain faithful to God if he remained in it.

Storrs became one of the leaders of the Second Advent movement and affiliated with William Miller and Joshua V. Himes. He began publication of his magazine Bible Examiner in 1843 and continued it until 1879 with a few breaks. After a considerable amount of study, Storrs preached to some Adventists on the condition and prospects for the dead. His book Six Sermons explained his conditionalist beliefs.

Storrs' writings influenced Charles Taze Russell, who founded the Bible Student movement from which Jehovah's Witnesses and numerous independent Bible Student groups emerged.
