= Jewish Museum of the American West =

Online database of pioneer Jews of the western United States

- Website type: Historical/religious
- Available in: English
- Website: jmaw.org
- Commercial: No
- Current status: Active

The Jewish Museum of the American West is an online museum sponsored by the Western States Jewish History Association dedicated to telling the stories of the participation of Jews in the development of the American West and why they were so successful. It was established in 2013 by Gladys Sturman and David W. Epstein of the Western States Jewish History Association as a continuation of its journal published from 1968 to 2018.
