= Advent Christian Church =

Body of Adventist Christians

Advent Christian Church (Advent Christian General Conference)
- Abbreviation: ACGC
- Classification: Protestant
- Governance: Congregational
- Director: Rev. Justin Nash
- Associations: National Association of Evangelicals, Evangelical Council for Financial Accountability
- Headquarters: Charlotte, North Carolina
- Origin: 1860; Providence, RI
- Branched from: Millerites
- Congregations: 226 in US (2025)
- Members: 15,545 in US (2025)
- Official website: www.acgc.us

The Advent Christian Church, also known as the Advent Christian General Conference (ACGC), is a "first-day" body of Adventist Christians founded in 1860. The organization's Executive Director is Reverend Justin Nash, and its president is Reverend John Tate. Headquartered in Charlotte, North Carolina, the functions of its central offices include global missions, leadership development, church planting and management of organizational publications and media. These ministries are under the leadership of the organization's Executive Director, Rev. Justin Nash, who is accountable to the organization's executive council. This council, a governing board made up of elected representatives from Advent Christian Churches, is chaired by the organization's president, Rev. John Tate. In addition to the work of the central offices, more localized work is done in five regions of the U.S. and Canada under the direction of five regional superintendents, as well as in several state conference bodies and in 30 countries around the world. The organization holds to a congregational structure, in which each of its member churches and their members has input into the overall direction of the organization.

== Early history ==
=== William Miller ===
Advent Christian origins trace back to the Second Advent movement inspired by the Baptist preacher William Miller of Pittsfield, Massachusetts. For many years, Miller studied the prophecies recorded in the Old Testament, especially the book of Daniel, and the book of Revelation from the New Testament. After many calculations, he announced in 1831 that the Second Advent would occur in 1843, later adjusting that date 1844. Thousands of people believed him and sold their possessions. His followers, called Millerites, waited for the coming of Christ and the end of the world and were greatly disappointed when his predictions proved incorrect.

=== Conditional Immortality ===
The doctrine of conditional immortality among Adventist preachers such as Charles F. Hudson (1795–1881) and George Storrs (1796–1879) eventually came to distinguish "Advent Christians" from other Adventists. Rejecting what they believed was a component of Greek philosophy (immortality of the soul), they taught that though man was created for immortality, that immortality had been forfeited in the fall of Adam. They believed that only the redeemed would receive eternal life; the dead unconsciously would await the resurrection and final judgement. At the time of judgement, the wicked would suffer extinction. These teachings separated them from the Evangelical Adventists who were more closely associated with William Miller. By 1860, these differences led to the formation of the "Christian Association" (later Advent Christian Association) in Providence, RI.

== Beliefs ==
=== Statement of faith ===
The Advent Christian statement of faith is as follows:

We believe the Bible to be the inspired, the only infallible, authoritative Word of God. (2 Timothy 3:16; 2 Peter 1:20-21)

We believe that there is one God, eternally existent in three persons: Father, Son, and Holy Spirit. (Deuteronomy 6:4; Matthew 28:19) The belief in the Trinity has not always been a cornerstone among Advent Christians, and was not formerly adopted as doctrine until 2017. Prior to 2017, there had been a 150 year debate going on within the movement with regards to this very topic, and many of the older rural Advent Christian Churches still reject the doctrine of the Trinity.

We believe in the deity of our Lord Jesus Christ, in His virgin birth, in His sinless life, in His miracles, in His vicarious and atoning death through His shed blood, in His bodily resurrection, in His ascension to the right hand of the Father, and in His personal return in power and glory. (Philippians 2:6-11; 1 Peter 3:18; Romans 5:9; Matthew 26:64)

We believe that for the salvation of lost and sinful people, regeneration by the Holy Spirit is absolutely essential. (Titus 3:4-7)

We believe in the present ministry of the Holy Spirit by whose indwelling the Christian is enabled to live a godly life. (John 14:15-18; John 16:13; John 16:7-11)

We believe in the resurrection of both the saved and the lost; they that are saved unto the resurrection of life and them that are lost unto the resurrection of damnation. (1 Corinthians 15:10-23; John 5:28-29)

We believe in the spiritual unity of believers in our Lord Jesus Christ. (Ephesians 1:22-23; Acts 2:41-47)

=== Declaration of Principles ===
The Advent Christian declaration of principles is as follows:

1. We believe that the Bible is the inspired Word of God, being in its entirety a revelation given to man under divine inspiration and providence; that its historic statements are correct, and that it is the only divine and infallible standard of faith and practice.
2. We believe, as revealed in the Bible:
  1. In one God, our Father, eternal, and infinite in his wisdom, love, and power, the Creator of all things, "in whom we live, and move, and have our being."
  2. And in Jesus Christ, our Lord, the only begotten Son of God, conceived of the Holy Spirit, born of the Virgin Mary; who came into our world to seek and to save that which was lost; who died for our sins; who was raised bodily from the dead for our justification; who ascended in heaven as our High Priest and Mediator, and who will come again in the end of this age, to judge the living and the dead, and to reign forever and ever.
  3. And in the Holy Spirit, the Comforter, sent from God to convince the world of sin, of righteousness and of judgment, whereby we are sanctified and sealed unto the day of redemption.
3. We believe that man was created for immortality, but that through sin he forfeited his divine birthright; that because of sin, death entered into the world, and passed upon all men; and that only through faith in Jesus Christ, the divinely ordained Life-giver, can men become "partakers of the divine nature," and live forever.
4. We believe that death is a condition of unconsciousness to all persons, righteous and wicked; a condition which will remain unchanged until the resurrection at Christ's Second Coming, at which time the righteous will receive everlasting life while the wicked will be "punished with everlasting destruction;" suffering complete extinction of being.
5. We believe that salvation is free to all those who, in this life and in this age, accept it on the conditions imposed, which conditions are simple and inflexible, namely, turning from sin, repentance toward God, faith in the Lord Jesus Christ, and a life of consecration to the service of God; thus excluding all hope of a future probation, or of universal salvation.
6. We believe that Jesus Christ, according to his promise, will come again to this earth, even "in like manner" as he went into heaven - personally, visibly and gloriously - to reign here forever; and that this coming is the hope of the church, inasmuch as upon that coming depend the resurrection and reward of the righteous, the abolition of sin and its consequences, and the renewal of the earth - now marred by sin - to become the eternal home of the redeemed, after which event the earth will be forever free from sin and death.
7. We believe that Bible prophecy has indicated the approximate time of Christ's return, and comparing its testimony with the signs of our times, we are confident that he is near, "even at the doors," and we believe that the great duty of the hour is the proclamation of this soon-coming redemption, the defense of Bible authority, inspiration and truth, and the salvation of lost men.
8. We believe the church of Christ is an institution of divine origin, which includes all true Christians, of whatever name; but that local church organizations should be independent of outside control, congregational in government, and subject to no dictation of priest, bishop or pope - although true fellowship and unity of action should exist between all such organizations.
9. We believe that the only ordinances of the church of Christ are Baptism and the Lord's Supper; immersion being the only true baptism.
10. We believe that the first day of the week, as the day set apart by the early church in commemoration of Christ's resurrection, should be observed as the Christian Sabbath, and used as a day of rest and religious worship.
11. We believe that war is contrary to the spirit and teachings of our Lord and Master, Jesus Christ; that it is contrary to the spirit of true brotherhood; and that our influence should be used against it. We believe the Bible also teaches that properly constituted government is ordained by God and is a divine instrument for man's welfare and protection. When an Advent Christian decides on the basis of Scripture and conscience, either to bear arms or to submit to penalties imposed for his refusal to do so, local Advent Christian congregations should extend continued fellowship and nurture.

== Statistics ==
In 2025, the Advent Christian Church had about 15,545 members in 225 churches across the United States─ a notable decline from the 28,300 it had in 1925. The largest concentration of churches is along the eastern coast of the United States, where they have a strong concentration of churches in most states. Additionally, they claim approximately 46,225 members internationally, spread out over work in 18 countries.

== Memberships and partnerships ==
The Advent Christian Church is a member of the National Association of Evangelicals and the Evangelical Council for Financial Accountability. They also have working partnerships with several other evangelical ministries.

== See also ==
- Christian revival
- Christianity in the 19th century
- Sarah Katherine Taylor
- Joshua Vaughan Himes
- List of Christian denominations#Adventism
- List of religions and religious denominations#Adventist and related churches
- Second Great Awakening
- Other movements in Category:Adventism

== Bibliography ==
- Crocombe, Jeff (2003). "Advent Christian Church". In Hillerbrand, Hans Joachim (ed.). Encyclopedia of Protestantism. Vol. 1. New York: Taylor and Francis. p. 10. ISBN 9780203484319.
- Glenmary Research Center. Churches and Church Membership in the United States (1990).
- Hewitt, Clyde E. Midnight and Morning: The Millerite Movement and the Founding of the Advent Christian Church.
- Knight, George R. (1994). 1844 and the Rise of Sabbatarian Adventism. Hagerstown, MD: Review and Herald Publishing. (Part VIII highlights the Albany Conference of 1845 which became a formative meeting in the development of the Advent Christian denomination (132).)
- Mead, Frank S.; Hill, Samuel S.; Atwood, Craig D. Handbook of Denominations in the United States.
- Melton, J. Gordon (ed.). Encyclopedia of American Religions.
- Tarling, Lowell R. (1981). "The Advent Christian Church". The Edges of Seventh-day Adventism: A Study of Separatist Groups Emerging from the Seventh-day Adventist Church (1844–1980). Barragga Bay, Bermagui South, NSW: Galilee Publications. pp. 12–23. ISBN 0-9593457-0-1.
