= Samuel S. Snow =

Millerite preacher (1806–1890)

Samuel Sheffield Snow (1806–1890) was a skeptic turned Millerite preacher who calculated that the return of Christ was to take place on October 22, 1844. His teaching sparked what became known as the "Seventh-Month movement," which led to the Great Disappointment when Jesus Christ did not return as expected.

== Biography ==
=== Millerism ===
Until the age of 35, Snow had been "a settled unbeliever in the Bible." He had even worked as an agent for the Boston Investigator, an avowedly atheistic newspaper. He was converted to Christianity in 1839, as a result of reading a copy of William Miller's lectures that his brother had bought.

After his conversion, he joined a Congregational Church in 1840. In 1842, at a Millerite camp meeting (see also: Seventh-day Adventist camp meetings) in East Kingston, New Hampshire, he devoted himself to preaching the Millerite message full-time.

On the 12th of August 1844 Snow said in Exeter, New Hampshire, that Jesus Christ would come back on the 22nd of October 1844.

== See also ==
- Adventism
- Great Disappointment
