= Millerism =

Christian movement founded by William Miller

The Millerites were the followers of the teachings of William Miller, who in 1831 first shared publicly his belief that the Second Advent of Jesus Christ would occur in roughly between 1843 and 1844. Coming during a period of religious intensity later termed the Second Great Awakening, his teachings were spread widely and grew in popularity, which led to the event known as the Great Disappointment when Miller’s predictions failed to materialize as expected.

While Miller’s message found devotees among a wide range of churches, the Christian denomination of Adventism developed from Millerism.

== Origins ==
Miller was a prosperous farmer, a Baptist lay preacher, and student of the Bible living in northeastern New York. He spent years of intensive study of symbolic meaning of the prophecies of Daniel, especially Daniel 8:14 (Unto two thousand and three hundred days; then shall the sanctuary be cleansed), the 2,300-day prophecy. Miller believed that the cleansing of the sanctuary represented the Earth's destruction by fire at Christ's Second Coming. Using the year-day method of prophetic interpretation, Miller became convinced that the 2,300-day period started in 457 BC with the decree to rebuild Jerusalem by Artaxerxes I of Persia. Simple calculation then indicated that this period would end about 1843. In September 1822, Miller formally stated his conclusions in a twenty-point document, including article 15, "I believe that the second coming of Jesus Christ is near, even at the door, even within twenty-one years,—on or before 1843." This document remained private for many years. Miller did eventually share his views, first to a few friends privately and later to some ministerial acquaintances. Initially he was disappointed at the lack of response from those he spoke to. "To my astonishment, I found very few who listened with any interest. Occasionally, one would see the force of the evidence, but the great majority passed it by as an idle tale." Miller states that he began his public lecturing in the village of Dresden, Washington County, New York, some 16 miles from his home, on "the first Sabbath in August 1833." However, as Sylvester Bliss points out, "The printed article from which this is copied was written in 1845. By an examination of his correspondence, it appears that he must have begun to lecture in August 1831. So that this date is a mistake of the printer or an error in Mr. Miller's memory." In 1832, Miller submitted a series of sixteen articles to the Vermont Telegraph—a Baptist paper. The first of these was published on May 15, and Miller writes of the public's response, "I began to be flooded with letters of inquiry respecting my views, and visitors flocked to converse with me on the subject." In 1834, unable to personally comply with many of the urgent requests for information and the invitations to travel and preach that he received, Miller published a synopsis of his teachings in a "little tract of 64 pages." These he "...scattered, the most of them gratuitously, sending them in reply to letters of inquiry and to places which I could not visit."

== A national movement ==
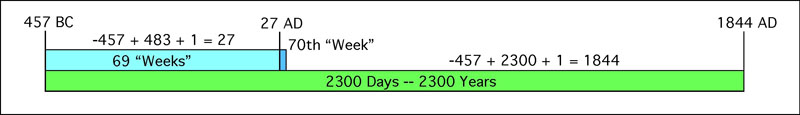
Miller's interpretation of the 2,300-day prophecy time line and its relation to the 70-week prophecy

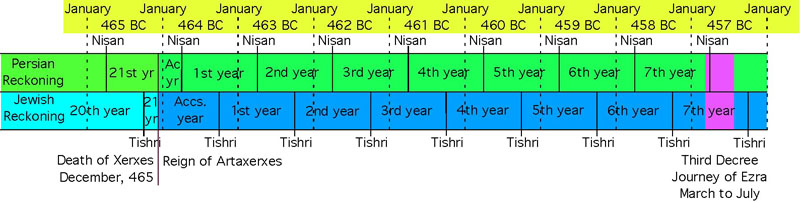
The beginning of the 2,300 days: The decree of Artaxerses in the 7th year of his reign (457 BC) as recorded in Ezra marks the beginning of the 2300 days. King's reigns were counted from New Year to New Year following an Accession Year. The Persian New Year began in Nisan (March–April). The Jewish civil New Year began in Tishri (September–October).

From 1840 onward, Millerism was transformed from an "obscure, regional movement into a national campaign." The key figure in this transformation was Joshua Vaughan Himes—the pastor of Chardon Street Chapel in Boston, and a publisher. Though Himes did not fully accept Miller's ideas until 1842, he established the fortnightly paper Signs of the Times to publicize them. The first edition was published on February 28, 1840, with Himes as editor. It continues to be published by the Seventh-day Adventist Church as a monthly evangelistic magazine under the same name.

Periodical literature played a part in the rapid and widespread dissemination of Millerite beliefs. "From first to last the power of the press, in this particular form, was one of the foremost factors in the success of this now vigorous, expanding movement." In addition to the Signs of the Times based in Boston, Millerite papers were published in numerous cities including New York City, Philadelphia, Rochester, Cleveland, and Montreal, Quebec. There were at least 48 Millerite periodicals that circulated in the period leading up to the Great Disappointment. The majority of these, however, were quite short-lived—often a new paper was started whenever a Millerite evangelistic campaign entered a new area.

As well as publications based on geography, the Millerites issued various papers targeting different groups. The Advent Message to the Daughters of Zion focused on female readers, and was first published in May 1844. The Advent Shield was a more academically orientated paper published in Boston and edited by Joshua Vaughan Himes, Sylvester Bliss, and Apollos Hale. Its announced purpose was to "defend the doctrine from the attacks of the enemies, to exhibit the unscriptural position of the opponents, and furnish the truth to those who were ready to receive it." While only three issues were produced: in May 1844, January 1845, and a final issue in April 1845; it was the largest of the Millerite papers, the first two issues each having 144 pages, and the final having 250. As the various dates of Christ's predicted return approached, Millerite publishing increased. In May 1843, 21,000 copies of the various Millerite papers were published for distribution each week. In New York alone, in the five-month period ending April 1843, 600,000 copies of various publications were distributed. In December 1843, Himes proposed the publication of one million tracts, while in May 1844, he announced that five million copies of Millerite publications had been distributed up to that time. Ruth Alden Doan examined the geographical distribution of correspondents to the Millerite periodical Signs of the Times from 1840 to 1847. Out of a total of 615 correspondents, she found that the 131 correspondents from New York State provided the largest group. Vermont provided another 107, with New England (excluding Vermont) accounting for a further 279. Outside of these areas, representation was sparse: 23 in New Jersey, Pennsylvania, Delaware and Maryland combined; just 65 from the west—including 20 from Ohio; and only 10 from the Southern States.

While the vast majority of Miller’s followers were of local origin, his message found devotees in other regions including outside the United States. Miller preached across the border in Canada’s Eastern Townships on at least three occasions: in 1835, 1838 and 1840. He made a number of converts there and gained the support of some of the local clergy. At least five Millerite papers were published in Canada: the Faithful Watchman—published in Sherbrooke from January 1843; the influential Voice of Elijah, published in Montreal from June 1843; the short-lived Hope of the Church in St. Thomas in 1844; Behold, He Cometh in Hamilton, and the Bridegroom's Herald in Toronto, both from mid-1844. Many travelers or emigrants to the United States who had heard the Second Advent message there returned to their home districts to preach. From 1841, Millerite evangelists appeared in Great Britain, also, though he never travelled there himself. In addition to the nearly $1,000 that Miller and Himes spent supplying literature to enquirers and evangelists in Great Britain, "there is evidence that [in Liverpool, Bristol, and other ports] local Millerite pioneers borrowed copies of Miller's works and Adventist magazines from visiting American sea captains and merchants." As well as using imported American literature, two Millerite papers were published locally in Great Britain: the Second Advent Harbinger in Bristol, and the British Midnight Cry in Liverpool. The Millerite message entered Australia through the Canadian paper Voice of Elijah. Thomas Playford, living in Adelaide, was converted thus. Playford spread the Millerite message in Australia, even publishing a book of his sermons: Discourses on the Second Advent of Jesus Christ. Playford’s preaching apparently resulted in a number of converts. An English Millerite by the name of James William Bonham sent copies of The Midnight Cry to Van Diemen’s Land (now Tasmania), though no record remains of their effect. In a similar manner, converts were made in Norway and Chile. A letter published in The Midnight Cry of October 12, 1843, from a Mrs. O. S. Burnham of Kaloa, the Sandwich Islands (now Hawaii), stated that she and her husband had accepted the Millerite message and were worshipping with a small company of believers. Despite the urging of his supporters, Miller never personally set an exact date for the expected Second Advent. However, in response to their urgings he did narrow the time-period to sometime in the year 1843, stating: "My principles in brief, are, that Jesus Christ will come again to this earth, cleanse, purify, and take possession of the same, with all the saints, sometime between March 21, 1843 and March 21, 1844".

March 21, 1844 passed without incident, and the majority of Millerites maintained their faith. On March 25, Miller wrote to Himes, "I am still looking for the Dear Savior... The time, as I have calculated it, is now filled up; and I expect every moment to see the Savior descend from heaven. I have now nothing to look for but this glorious hope." According to George R. Knight, the movement's survival was a result of the fact that, "the Millerite leaders had been ‘soft’ on the time... They allowed for the possibility of small errors in their calculations and even in some of their historic dates." In fact, on February 28, Miller himself had written, "If Christ comes, as we expect, we will sing the song of victory soon; if not, we will watch, and pray, and preach until he comes, for soon our time, and all prophetic days, will have been filled."

Further discussion and study resulted in the brief adoption of a new date—April 18, 1844, one based on the Karaite Jewish calendar (as opposed to the Rabbinic calendar). Like the previous date, April 18 passed without Christ's return. More study led the Millerites to believe that they had entered the "tarrying time"—a time of waiting after which Christ would finally return. This belief sustained the Millerites through the months of May to July 1844. As Knight notes however, this period represented a "flatness in Millerite evangelism," when even the Millerite preachers must have experienced diminished certainty. In August 1844 at a camp-meeting in Exeter, New Hampshire, everything changed when Samuel S. Snow presented a message of earth-shattering proportions—what became known as the "seventh-month" message or the "true midnight cry."

In a complex discussion based on scriptural typology, Snow presented his conclusion (still based on the 2,300-day prophecy in Daniel 8:14), that Christ would return on, "the tenth day of the seventh month of the present year, 1844." Again using the calendar of the Karaite Jews, this date was determined to be October 22, 1844. This "seventh month message" "spread with a rapidity unparalleled in the Millerite experience" amongst the general population. The situation caught many of the established leaders—including Himes and Miller himself, by surprise. Knight reports that, "There is no evidence that any of the foremost Millerite preachers accepted this grass-roots development until late September. Most did not accept it until early October."

== Great Disappointment ==
October 22, 1844, the day Jesus was expected to return, ended like any other day to the disappointment of the Millerites. Both Millerite leaders and followers were left generally bewildered and disillusioned. Responses varied: some Millerites continued to look daily for Christ’s return, others predicted different dates—among them April, July, and October 1845. Some theorized that the world had entered the seventh millennium, the "Great Sabbath", and that, therefore, the saved should not work. Others acted as children, basing their belief on Jesus’ words in Mark 10:15, "Truly, I say to you, whoever does not receive the kingdom of God like a child shall not enter it." J. D. Pickands used Revelation 14:14–16 to teach that Christ was now sitting on a white cloud, and must be prayed down. Some simply gave up their beliefs and attempted to rebuild their lives. Some members rejoined their previous denominations, while a substantial number became Shakers. Hundreds joined the Shakers, who believed that Christ had already appeared for the second time in the person of Mother Ann Lee. The "Advents'" impact was greatest on the Shaker villages at Union Village and Whitewater, Ohio, Harvard, Massachusetts, and Canterbury, New Hampshire. Some remained Shakers for the rest of their lives; others left after a short time.

== Post-Great Disappointment Millerism ==
In the confusion that followed the Great Disappointment it seemed that almost every Millerite had an opinion—all of them different. Miller said that in one week he received sixteen different papers advocating different views, all claiming to be Advent papers. Much of the responsibility for this proliferation of viewpoints must be shouldered by Miller, whose Rules of Biblical Interpretation outlined a method of biblical study that encouraged each person to read the Bible and to "do theology" for themselves. By mid-1845, doctrinal lines amongst the various Millerite groups began to solidify, emphasizing their differences—a process Knight terms "sect building". During this time three main Millerite groups formed, in addition to those who had simply given up their beliefs. The first major division of the Millerite groups who had not completely given up their belief in Christ’s Second Advent were those who accepted a shut-door theology. This belief was popularized by Joseph Turner and was based on that key Millerite passage: Matthew 25:1–13—the Parable of the Ten Virgins. The shut door mentioned in verses 11–12 was interpreted as the "close of probation". As Knight explains, "After the door was shut, there would be no additional salvation. The wise virgins (true believers) would be in the kingdom, while the foolish virgins and all others would be on the outside." The belief became a major issue upon the publication in January 1845, of an article by Apollos Hale and Turner in The Advent Mirror. This article tied the shut-door concept to October 22, 1844, teaching that the work of general salvation was finished at that date—Christ came spiritually as the Bridegroom, the wise virgins had entered into the wedding feast, and the door was then shut on all others. This first group is commonly known as either the "shut-door" or "spiritualizer" group. The widespread acceptance of the "shut-door" belief lost ground as doubts were raised about the significance of the October 22, 1844, date—if nothing happened on that date, then there could be no shut door. The opposition to these "shut-door" beliefs was led by Joshua Vaughan Himes and make up the second post-'Great Disappointment' group. This faction soon gained the upper hand, even converting Miller to their point of view. On March 20, 1845, the Morning Watch published a call by Himes for a conference. The Albany Conference was to have three purposes:

1. "to strengthen one another in the faith of the Advent at the door",
2. "to consult on the best mode of unitedly carrying forth our work, in comforting and preparing the Advent congregations among us for the speedy coming of the Lord", and
3. "to unite our efforts, for the conversion and salvation of sinners".

Notably, the stated purpose of the conference was not to debate controversial doctrines. In fact the invitation was extended only to those Adventists who "still adhere to the original faith". The Shut-door Adventists and others who had developed new doctrines were therefore explicitly excluded. The biggest draw was to be the presence of Miller. In fact Himes wrote to Miller on March 27, 1845, saying, "all depends upon your being there". The Albany Conference began on April 29, 1845, and was to be "one of the most significant Adventist meetings in the history of post-October 1844 Adventism". The delegates to the Albany Conference—including prominent Millerite leaders such as Miller, Himes, Elon Galusha, Josiah Litch, and Sylvester Bliss; accomplished three main tasks:

1. The production of a ten-point statement of belief,
2. The development of a plan for evangelism that involved further organization, including the establishment of Sunday Schools and Bible classes; and the ordination of selected believers as ministers, and
3. The passing of a series of resolutions that rejected a number of beliefs and practices seen as extreme; including mixed foot-washing, compulsory salutation kissing, shaving one's head, and acting childlike.

The Albany Conference group of Millerites formed the Evangelical Adventists out of which rose the Advent Christian Church. The Albany Conference Statement with its narrowing of beliefs was unacceptable to many. Millerism had been founded on Miller's open, non-restrictive approach to Bible study—"It was the freedom to discover new truths that had drawn so many Christians and Freewill Baptists to the movement. The new restrictive definitions charted a course that was unacceptable to many who had joined the movement." The third major post-disappointment Millerite group also claimed—like the Hale and Turner led group—that the October 22 date was correct. Rather than Christ returning invisibly however, they came to view the event that took place on October 22, 1844, as having been quite different. The theology of this third group appears to have had its beginnings as early as October 23, 1844—the day after the Great Disappointment. On that day, during a prayer session with a group of Advent believers, Hiram Edson became convinced that "light would be given" and their "disappointment explained". Some years later, Edson reported on his experiences following that meeting: "While passing through a large field I was stopped about midway of the field. Heaven seemed open to my view, and I saw distinctly and clearly that instead of our High Priest coming out of the Most Holy of the heavenly sanctuary to come to this earth on the tenth day of the seventh month, at the end of the 2300 days, that He for the first time entered on that day the second apartment of that sanctuary; and that He had a work to perform in the Most Holy before coming to this earth in His Second Coming. That he came to the marriage at that time; in other words, to the Ancient of Days to receive a kingdom, dominion, and glory; and we must wait for his return from the wedding." Edson's experience led him into an extended study on the topic with O. R. L. Crosier and F. B. Hahn. They came to the conclusion that "the sanctuary to be cleansed in Daniel 8:14 was not the earth or the church, but the sanctuary in heaven". Therefore, the October 22 date marked not the Second Coming of Christ, but rather a heavenly event. This is the basis for the later Seventh-day Adventist doctrine of the Investigative Judgement. An article written by O. R. L. Crosier titled "To All Who Are Waiting for Redemption, the Following is Addressed" summarising their insights, was published in the March 1845 edition of the Day-Dawn. A more comprehensive article—also by O. R. L. Crosier and titled "The Law of Moses" was published in the Day-Star of February 7, 1846. It is out of this third Millerite group that the Seventh-day Adventist Church arose.

== Doctrine ==
The Millerites originally had adherents across denominational lines, especially from Baptist, Presbyterian, Methodist and Campbellite churches, forming distinct denominations only after the Great Disappointment. They were united by a belief in the imminent return of Jesus Christ—the Second Advent. After the Great Disappointment of October 22, 1844, discussion of beliefs began to fragment the once united Millerites. Dunton points out that there were four main divisive doctrines being discussed by Millerites around the time of the Albany Conference:

1. Biblical prophecies relating to the Jews. The majority of Millerites believed that these prophecies would find a spiritual rather than a literal fulfilment; however the Age to Come Adventists led by Joseph Marsh believed in a literal, physical Jewish return to Palestine prior to the Christ's return.
2. Conditional immortality was not discussed at the Albany Conference, but was a source of controversy soon after.
3. The doctrine of the Sabbath was one of the schismatic issues debated at the Albany Conferences. The seventh-day Sabbath was rejected by delegates at the Albany Conference, who passed a resolution to have "no fellowship with Jewish fables and commandments of man, that turn from the truth." Sabbatarianism remained a minority position among the Millerites, but the doctrine received a significant boost when Thomas Preble published a tract on the topic. The tract, titled, A Tract, Showing that the Seventh Day Should Be Observed as the Sabbath, Instead of the First Day; "According to the Commandment", was widely read by Miller's followers.
4. Following the disappointment of October 22, there was considerable discussion regarding the continuing possibility of the conversion of sinners. The doctrine that excluded this possibility became known as the shut-door. Miller himself believed this for a short time, though he later changed and repudiated it.

== Influence ==
The Bible Student movement had connections at the very beginning (in the early 2nd half of 19th century) with the Millerite movement. Charles Taze Russell later stated that "I confess indebtedness to Adventists as well as to other denominations". In light of this, the Bible Student Movement was influenced by Adventists roots, but did not emerge from the Millerism movement. Followers of the Baháʼí Faith also credit Miller's analysis of the time of Christ's return. See also Day-year principle for a more complete review of how William Miller's analysis of the 2,300-day prophecy of Daniel 8 matches the Baháʼí understanding. Baháʼís believe that, although William Miller's understanding of the location and method of Christ's return was not accurate, his calculation of the timing was entirely correct. Many Adventist sects emerged from the movement, including Seventh Day Adventists.

== See also ==
- Category:Adventism
- Burned-over District
- Christian eschatology
- Christian revival
- Christianity in the 19th century
- Millennialism
- Unfulfilled Christian religious predictions
