= William Miller (preacher) =

American founder of the Adventist movement (1782–1849)

The Reverend William Miller
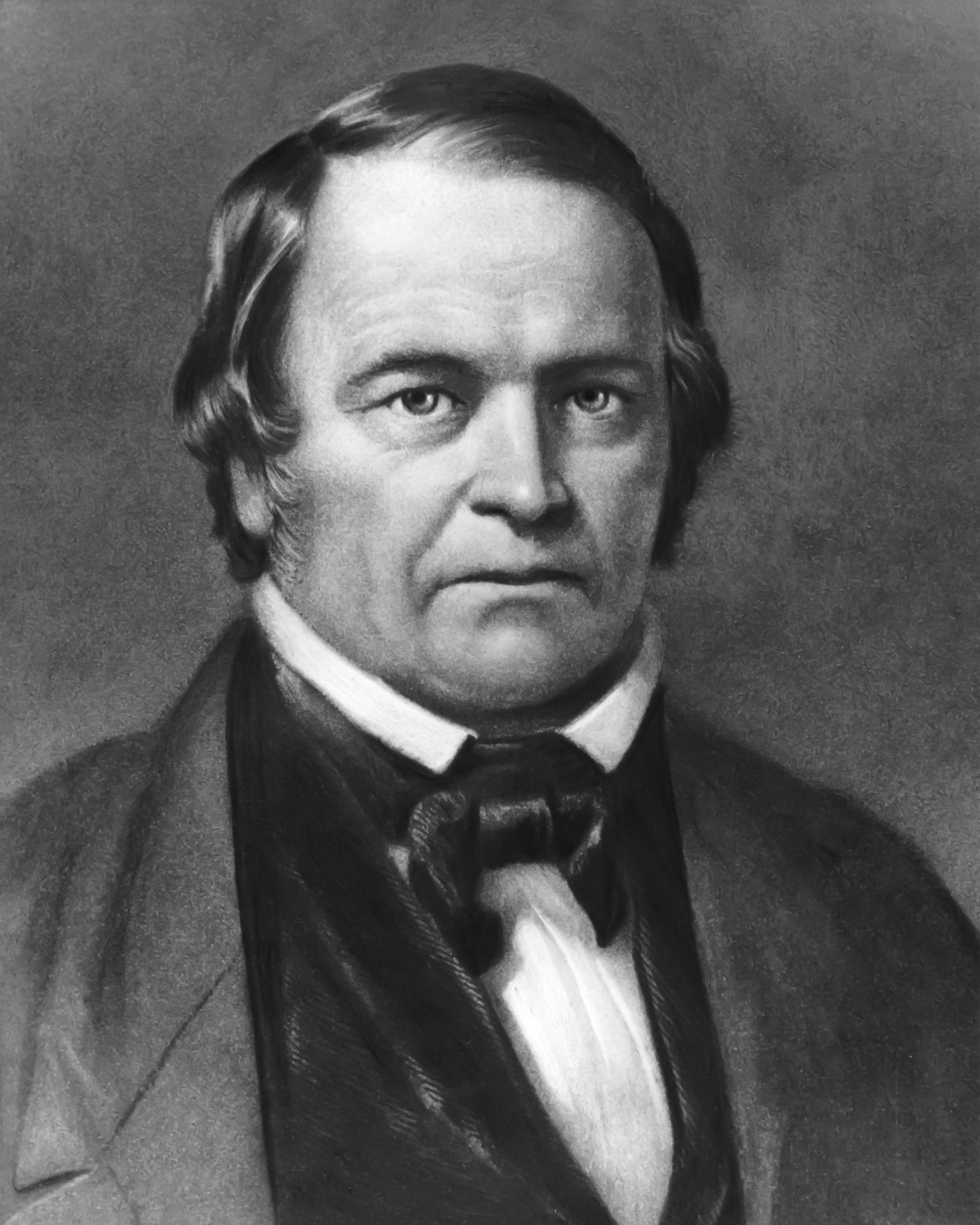
- Portrait, c. 1840
- Born: February 15, 1782; Pittsfield, Massachusetts, U.S.
- Died: December 20, 1849 (aged 67); Low Hampton, New York, U.S.
- Occupations: Farmer; Military officer; Clergyman
- Spouse: Lucy Smith
- Children: 5

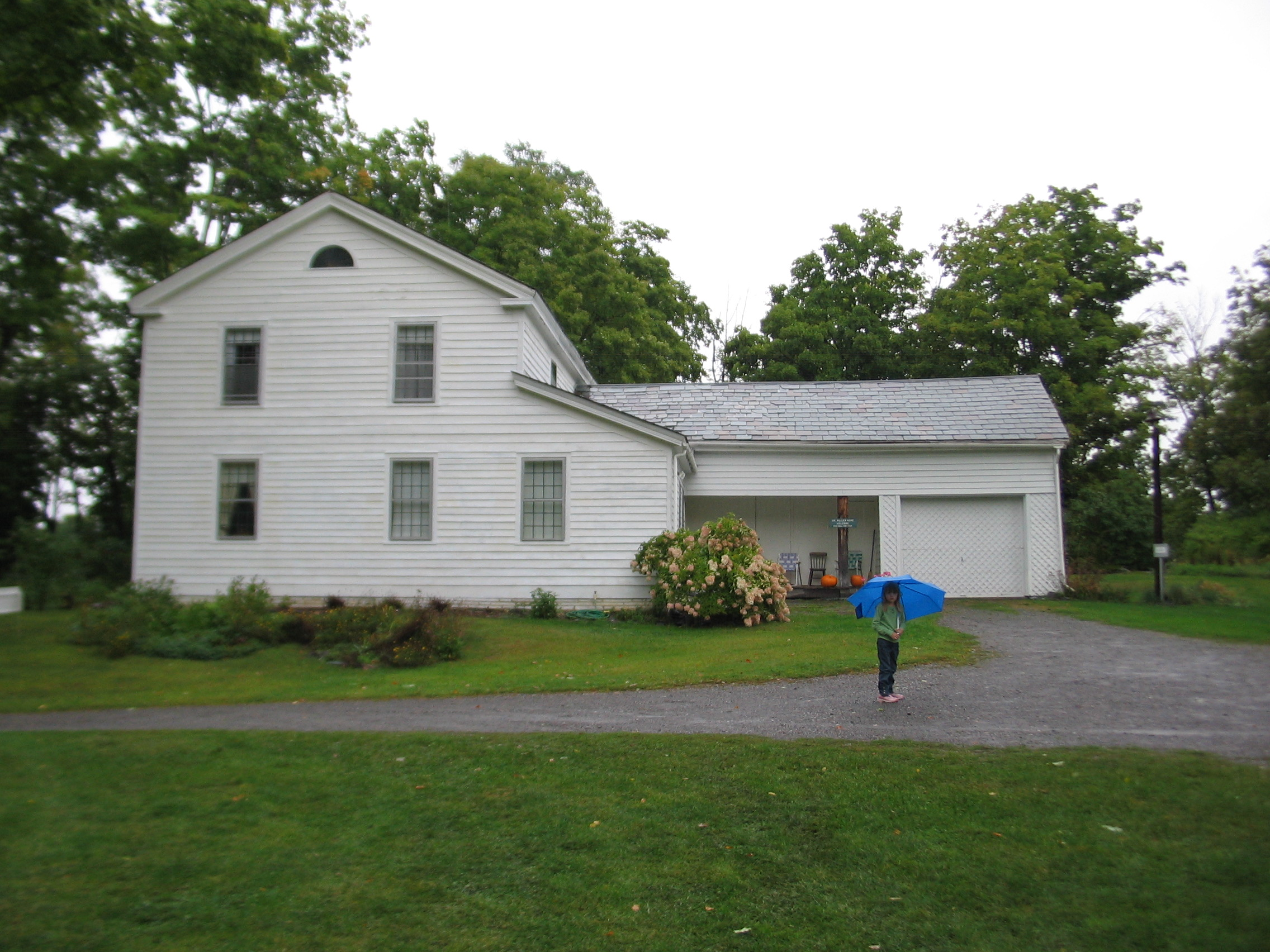
William Miller's home Low Hampton, New York

William Miller (February 15, 1782 – December 20, 1849) was an American clergyman who is credited with beginning the mid-19th-century North American religious movement known as Millerism. After his proclamation of the Second Coming did not occur as expected in the 1840s, new heirs of his message emerged, including the Advent Christians (1860), the Seventh-day Adventists (1863) and other Adventist movements.

== Early life ==
William Miller was born on February 15, 1782, in Pittsfield, Massachusetts. His parents were Captain William Miller, a veteran of the American Revolution, and Paulina. When he was four years old, his family moved to rural Low Hampton, New York. Miller was educated at home by his mother until the age of nine, when he attended the newly established East Poultney District School. As a youth, he had access to the private libraries of Judge James Witherell and Congressman Matthew Lyon in nearby Fair Haven, Vermont, as well as that of Alexander Cruikshanks of Whitehall, New York. In 1803, Miller married Lucy Smith and moved to her nearby hometown of Poultney, where he took up farming at his in-laws. While in Poultney, Miller was elected to a number of civil offices, starting with the office of Constable. In 1809 he was elected to the office of Deputy Sheriff and at an unknown date was elected Justice of the Peace. Miller served in the Vermont militia and was commissioned a lieutenant on July 21, 1810.

Shortly after his move to Poultney, Miller rejected his Baptist heritage and became a Deist. In his biography Miller records his conversion: "I became acquainted with the principal men in that village [Poultney, Vermont], who were professedly Deists; but they were good citizens, and of a moral and serious deportment. They put into my hands the works of Voltaire, [David] Hume, Thomas Paine, Ethan Allen, and other deistical writers."

== Military service ==
At the outbreak of the War of 1812, Miller raised a company of local men and traveled to Burlington, Vermont. He transferred to the 30th Infantry Regiment in the regular army of the United States with the rank of lieutenant. Miller spent most of the war working as a recruiter and on February 1, 1814, he was promoted to captain. He saw his first action at the Battle of Plattsburgh, where vastly outnumbered American forces overcame the British. "The fort I was in was exposed to every shot. Bombs, rockets, and shrapnel shells fell as thick as hailstones", he said. One of these many shots had exploded two feet from him, wounding three of his men and killing another, but Miller survived without a scratch. Miller came to view the outcome of this battle as miraculous, and therefore at odds with his deistic view of a distant God far removed from human affairs. He later wrote, "It seemed to me that the Supreme Being must have watched over the interests of this country in an especial manner, and delivered us from the hands of our enemies... So surprising a result, against such odds, did seem to me like the work of a mightier power than man."

== Religious life ==
After the war, and following his discharge from the army on June 18, 1815, Miller returned to Poultney. Shortly after his return he moved with his family back to Low Hampton, where he purchased a 200-acre farm. (now a historic site operated by Adventist Heritage Ministry). He later built a chapel on his farm in 1848. Throughout this time period Miller was deeply concerned with the question of death and an afterlife. This reflection upon his own mortality followed his experiences as a soldier in the war, but also the recent deaths of his father and sister. Miller apparently felt that there were only two options possible following death: annihilation, and accountability; neither of which he was comfortable with.

Soon after his return to Low Hampton, Miller took tentative steps towards regaining his Baptist faith. At first he attempted to combine both, publicly espousing Deism while simultaneously attending his local Baptist church. His attendance turned to participation when he was asked to read the day's sermon during one of the local minister's frequent absences. His participation changed to commitment one Sunday when he was reading a sermon on the duties of parents and became choked with emotion. Miller records the experience:

Suddenly the character of a Savior was vividly impressed upon my mind. It seemed that there might be a Being so good and compassionate as to Himself atone for our transgressions, and thereby save us from suffering the penalty of sin. I immediately felt how lovely such a Being must be; and imagined that I could cast myself into the arms of, and trust in the mercy of, such a One.

Following his conversion, Miller's Deist friends soon challenged him to justify his newfound faith. He did so by examining the Bible closely, declaring to one friend "If he would give me time, I would harmonize all these apparent contradictions to my own satisfaction, or I will be a Deist still." Miller commenced with Genesis 1:1, studying each verse and not moving on until he felt the meaning was clear. In this way he became convinced firstly, that postmillennialism was unbiblical; and secondly, that the time of Christ's Second Coming was revealed in Bible prophecy.

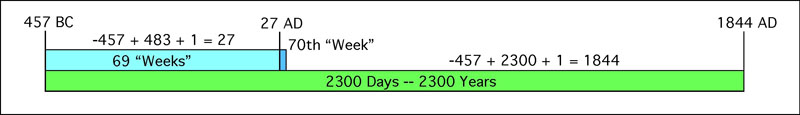
Miller's interpretation of the 2300 days prophecy time-line and its relation to the 70 weeks prophecy

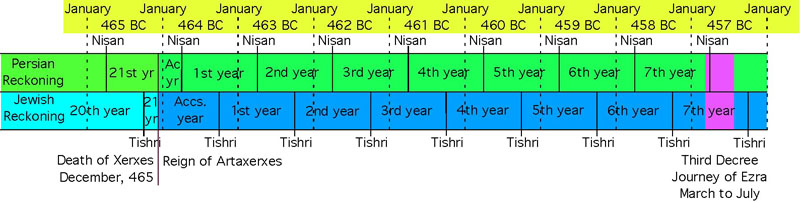
Beginning of the 70 weeks: The decree of Artaxerxes I of Persia in the 7th year of his reign (457 BC) as recorded in Ezra marks beginning of 70 weeks. Kings' reigns were counted from New Year to New Year following an "Accession Year". The Persian New Year began in Nisan (March–April). The civil New Year in the Kingdom of Judah began in Tishri (September–October).

Basing his calculations principally on Daniel 8:14: "Unto two thousand and three hundred days; then shall the sanctuary be cleansed", Miller assumed that the cleansing of the sanctuary represented the Earth's purification by fire at Christ's Second Coming. Then, using the interpretive principle of the "day-year principle", Miller (and others) interpreted a day in prophecy to read not as a 24-hour period, but rather as a calendar year. Further, Miller became convinced that the 2,300 day period started in 457 BC with the decree to rebuild Jerusalem by Artaxerxes I of Persia. Simple calculation then revealed that this period would end in 1843. Miller records, "I was thus brought... to the solemn conclusion, that in about twenty-five years from that time 1818 all the affairs of our present state would be wound up."

Although Miller was convinced of his calculations by 1818, he continued to study privately until 1823 to ensure the correctness of his interpretation. In September 1822, Miller formally stated his conclusions in a twenty-point document, including article 15: "I believe that the second coming of Jesus Christ is near, even at the door, even within twenty-one years, – on or before 1843." Miller did not, however, begin his public lecturing until the first Sunday in August 1831 in the town of Dresden.

In 1832 Miller submitted a series of sixteen articles to the Vermont Telegraph, a Baptist newspaper. The Telegraph published the first of these on May 15, and Miller writes of the public's response: "I began to be flooded with letters of inquiry respecting my views; and visitors flocked to converse with me on the subject." In 1834, unable to personally comply with many of the urgent requests for information and the invitations to travel and preach that he received, Miller published a synopsis of his teachings in a 64-page tract with the lengthy title: Evidence from Scripture and History of the Second Coming of Christ, about the Year 1844: Exhibited in a Course of Lectures.

== Miller and Freemasonry ==
Miller was an active Freemason until 1831. Miller resigned his Masonic membership in 1831, stating that he did so to "avoid fellowship with any practice that may be incompatible with the word of God among masons." By 1833 he wrote in a letter to his friends to treat Freemasonry "as they would any other evil".

== Millerism ==
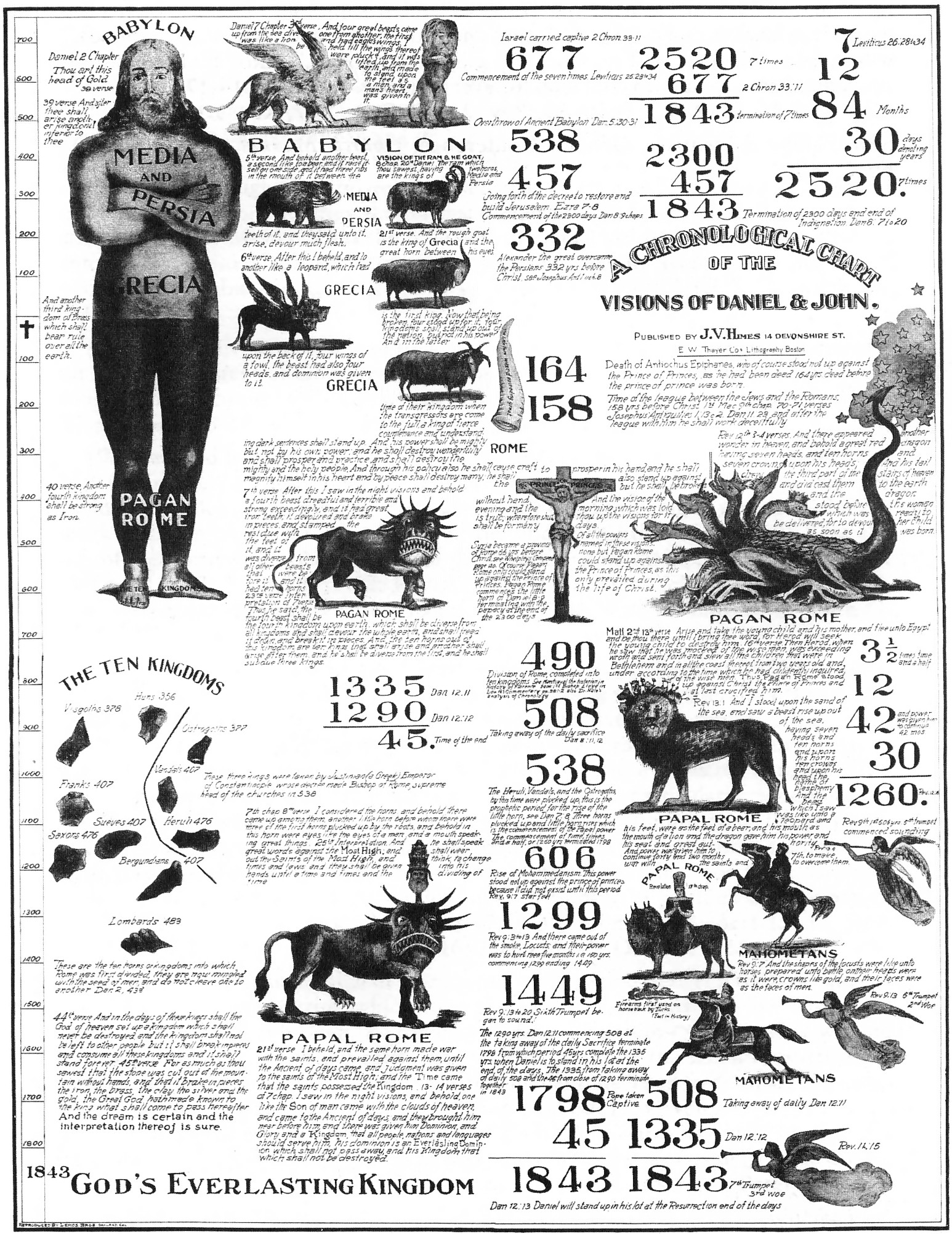
A chart showing Miller's calculations which mark the Second Coming at 1843.

From 1840 onwards, Millerism was transformed from an "obscure, regional movement into a national campaign." The key figure in this transformation was Joshua Vaughan Himes, the pastor of Chardon Street Chapel in Boston, Massachusetts, and an able and experienced publisher. Though Himes did not fully accept Miller's ideas until 1842, he established the fortnightly paper Signs of the Times on February 28, 1840, to publicize them.

Despite the urging of his supporters, Miller never personally set an exact date for the expected Second Advent. However, in response to their urgings, he did narrow the time-period to sometime in the Jewish year beginning in the Gregorian year 1843, stating: "My principles in brief, are, that Jesus Christ will come again to this earth, cleanse, purify, and take possession of the same, with all the saints, sometime between March 21, 1843, and March 21, 1844." March 21, 1844, passed without incident, and further discussion and study resulted in the brief adoption of a new date (April 18, 1844) based on the Karaite calendar (as opposed to the Rabbinic calendar). Like the previous date, April 18 passed without Christ's return. Miller responded publicly, writing, "I confess my error, and acknowledge my disappointment; yet I still believe that the day of the Lord is near, even at the door."

In August 1844 at a camp-meeting in Exeter, New Hampshire, Samuel S. Snow presented a message that became known as the "seventh-month" message or the "true midnight cry." In a discussion based on scriptural typology, Snow presented his conclusion (still based on the 2300 day prophecy in Daniel 8:14), that Christ would return on, "the tenth day of the seventh month of the present year, 1844." Again, based largely on the calendar of the Karaite Jews, this date was determined to be October 22, 1844.

== The Great Disappointment ==
On October 22, 1844, Miller awaited the end of the age together with much of his extended family on his Low Hampton farm. Expected given Miller's personality, this arrangement was also broadly reflective of Millerites in general, who likewise spent the day and night in large part gathered together in their homes, churches, or meetinghouses—contrary to popular images which lampooned Millerites as eagerly crowding atop rooftops and hills. After the failure of Miller's expectations for that day, the event became known as the Great Disappointment. Hiram Edson recorded that "Our fondest hopes and expectations were blasted, and such a spirit of weeping came over us as I never experienced before... We wept, and wept, till the day dawn."

Reaction of Millerites to the Great Disappointment
What Happened on October 22, 1844?	Attitude toward Prophecy	Reaction	Numbers of Millerites	Current groups
No Second Advent	1844 date invalid Prophecy invalid	Abandoned their beliefs	Tens of thousands	Majority left Christianity; Minority rejoined former churches
No Second Advent	1844 date invalid Prophecy valid	Jesus coming soon Some set other dates	Many hundreds	Advent Christian Church, Jehovah's Witnesses
Second Advent occurred – Spiritualized	1844 date valid Prophecy valid	Short lived “holy flesh” movement	Hundreds	Joined Shakers
Date not about Second Advent	1844 date valid Prophecy valid	Cleansing of Sanctuary meant Pre-Advent judgment Second Advent still coming	Dozens	Seventh-day Adventist Church

Following the Great Disappointment, most Millerites simply gave up their beliefs. Some did not and viewpoints and explanations proliferated. Miller initially seems to have thought that Christ's Second Coming was still going to take place—that "the year of expectation was according to prophecy; but...that there might be an error in Bible chronology, which was of human origin, that could throw the date off somewhat and account for the discrepancy." Miller never gave up his belief in the Second Coming of Christ.

Estimates of Miller's followers—the Millerites—vary between 50,000, and 500,000. Miller's legacy includes the Advent Christian Church with 61,000 members, and the Seventh-day Adventist Church with over 19 million members. Both these denominations have direct connections with the Millerites and the Great Disappointment. A number of other individuals with ties to the Millerites founded various short-lived groups. These include Clorinda S. Minor, who led a group of seven to Palestine to prepare for Christ's second coming at a later date.

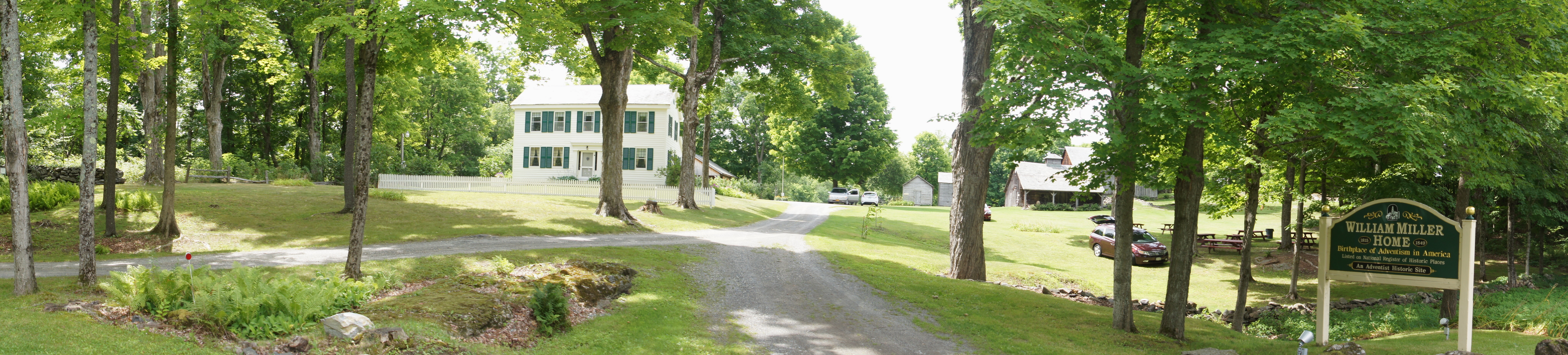
The William Miller home is a registered National Historic Landmark and preserved as a museum. The site is not far from the New York-Vermont border.

Miller died on December 20, 1849, his funeral was at a Congregational church in Fair Haven. He is buried near his home in Low Hampton, NY and the William Miller Farm is a National Register of Historic Places.

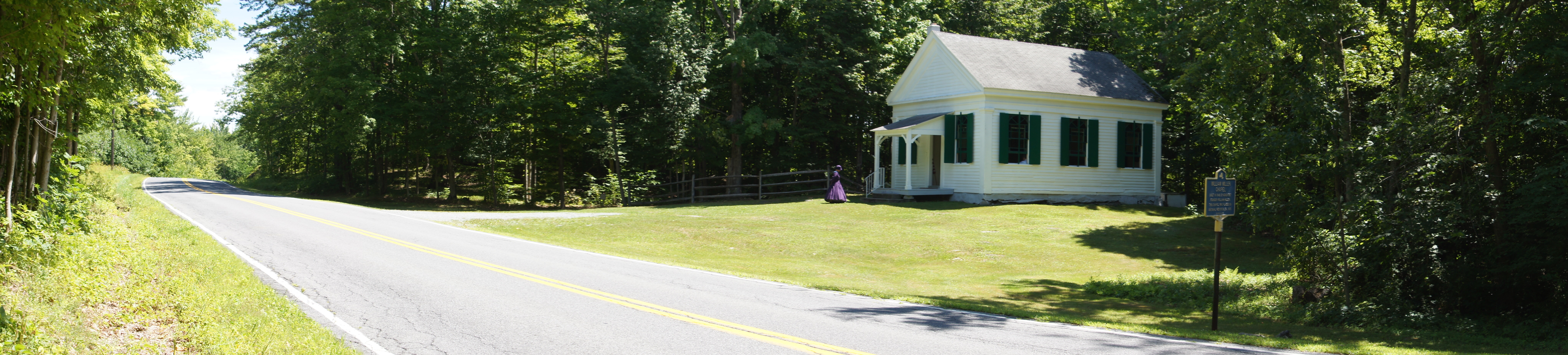
The William Miller Chapel, just a short walk from the Miller home, is managed by a board composed of Seventh-day Adventists and Advent Christian Church members.

== Resources ==
The papers of William Miller are preserved in the archives at Aurora University. Other papers by Miller can be located at the archives at Andrews University and Loma Linda University. In addition some historical documents were found in Miller's home when his home was purchased by Adventist Heritage Ministry as a historic property in 1983, and are housed in the Ellen G. White Estate vault in Silver Spring, Maryland.

The standard biography of William Miller is Memoirs of William Miller by Sylvester Bliss (Boston: Joshua V. Himes, 1853). It was republished with a critical introduction by Andrews University Press in 2006. Other helpful treatments include F. D. Nichol, The Midnight Cry and Clyde Hewitt, Midnight and Morning.

David L. Rowe published God's Strange Work: William Miller and the End of the World (Eerdmans: 2008), as part of the Library of Religious Biography series. One reviewer described it as a "keen historical and cultural analysis."

== See also ==
- Christian eschatology
- Millennialism
- Second Great Awakening
