= History of Kingsway College =

Kingsway College is a high school in Oshawa, Ontario, Canada, with a Seventh-day Adventist environment which encourages personal spiritual commitment and fosters academic excellence, physical fitness, sensitive service, and growth in employment and social skills.

The school was established in 1903 in Lorne Park (a community to the west of Toronto, now part of Mississauga) by Eugene Leland and his wife, and was then known as Lornedale Academy, and had eight students from Grades 1–9. By 1907, the enrollment had grown to 40 students. In 1911, Lornedale had become a high school, serving grades 7–12, which led to a need for more space and equipment.

The school began looking for a new site, and the present site in Oshawa (east of Toronto) was acquired. The school was renamed Buena Vista Academy, and opened in 1912. The school quickly grew. In 1914, it became a Union Conference school. In 1916, it became a junior college with fourteen grades, and its name was changed to Eastern Canadian Missionary Seminary.

In 1920, the school was incorporated, leading to another name change, this time to Oshawa Missionary College. During the Depression years, enrollment decreased and some programs were discontinued, following which an improvement program was implemented in 1933. Enrollment decreased again during World War II, but following the war, the college enjoyed a period of expansion.

In 1963, the school name was changed once more, to Kingsway College, reflecting a curriculum that included a complete academic program while decreasing the implication that the school was only a Bible college. In 1975, the Branson school of nursing was closed due to a change in nursing education policy by the Ontario government. This led to the decision to close the remainder of the college program and merge it with Canadian Union College in Alberta, leaving Kingsway strictly a high school. Since then Kingsway College has followed the ups and downs that have come with the Ontario education system, including the phasing out of OAC in 2002.

== Lornedale Academy 1903 - 1912 ==
An Overview

Kingsway College "had its birth not at Oshawa, but in a beautiful fruit farming section, about fifteen miles west of Toronto. In 1903, the officers of the Ontario Conference opened the first academy in this part of Canada in a farm house at Lorne Park. As the academy grew, a large addition was made to the house, making it into quite a convenient dormitory, with the necessary class rooms, and chapel. For nine years Lornedale Academy at Lorne Park was the Adventist educational centre for Ontario, and also well patronized by our members in Quebec."

=== 1904 ===
Lornedale Academy Publishes the Canadian Union Messenger

The executive committee of the Canadian Union Conference of Seventh-day Adventists voted to turn over to the management of the Lornedale Academy the printing, editing and mailing of The Canadian Union Messenger. Thus began a unique and practical educational venture. In September, the academy installed a printing plant on campus and the school's work of publishing the Messenger began under the supervision of principal Leland. For the December 8 issue of the Messenger, Eugene Leland reported that the type-setting, the press-work, and the editorial work was done almost entirely by students who, three weeks ago, had never been in a printing office before. All the students helped with preparing the Messenger for mailing. The principal then took the papers to the post office. Mr. Leland observed,

"If the readers of the Messenger take as much pleasure in perusing its columns as the students do in composing them, I am sure that the 'Messenger' family is the happiest one in existence. We hope to present some articles from the students as soon as the press of matter occasioned by the week of prayer, and the Missionary campaign, is disposed of."

Christ's Object Lessons as a Fund-raiser for the School

An Informal Minority Meeting of the General Concerence Committee of Seventh-day Adventists met at Takoma Park, Maryland on July 19, 1904. A.G. Daniells, W.C. White, and W.W. Prescott, and, by invitation, I. H. Evans, discussed the need of establishing a training-school in the Ontario Conference. Evans had recently attended the annual camp-meeting for Ontario. They took this action:

"VOTED that we respond to the request of the Ontario Conference for help ln establishing their school, and that we donate a supply of "Christ's Object Lessons" as far as they will sell them up to 5000 copies, paying therefor 25 cents per copy F.0.B. at the shipping point."

The 5th annual session of the Ontario Conference held June 16–26, 1904, dedicated the last of their seven meetings to the work of selling Christ's Object Lessons, a book by Ellen G. White. At this last meeting, 55 people pledged to sell 1,251 books. The conference appointed T. H. Robinson to oversee the sales of the books. The months of October, November, and December, of 1904, were "set apart among all our people to especially prosecute this work."

Ellen White relates how her book Christ's Object Lessons came to be linked to the financial support of Adventist schools,

"I am so thankful for the work that Christ’s Object Lessons has accomplished and is still accomplishing. When this book was in preparation, I expected to use the means coming from the sale of this book in preparing and publishing several other books. But the Lord put it into my mind to give this book to our schools, to be used in freeing them from debt. I asked our publishing houses to unite with me in this gift by donating the expense of the publication. This they willingly agreed to do. A fund was raised to pay for the materials used in printing the book, and canvassers and people have sold the book without commission.

"Thus the book has been circulated in all parts of the world. It has been received with great favor everywhere. Ministers of all denominations have written testimonials recommending it. The Lord has prepared the way for its reception so that no fewer than 200,000 have already been sold. The means thus raised has gone far toward freeing our schools from the debts that have been accumulating for many years.

"Our publishing houses have printed 300,000 copies, free of cost, and these have been distributed to the different tract societies, to be sold by our people.

"The Lord has made the sale of this book a means of teaching our people how to come in touch with those not of their faith, and how to impart to them a knowledge of the truth for this time. Many have been converted by reading this book."

The School Farm

"Bro. Charles Sweeten shipped 500 quart of berries, to the market on Monday, the 8th inst. (the current month, August, 1904), from the school farm, the result of one days' picking."

Sunday Laws and the School Farm

On, August 15, 1904, Charles Sweeten and Fred Boettger, both employees on the Lorne Dale Academy farm, were summoned to appear before the Magistrate in answer to a complaint made against them for working on the Lord's day. At the time of the trial, the defense attorney failed to show. Charles Sweeten did not want to proceed without his attorney. However, the Crown attorney demanded his pay for the day plus the pay for the attendance of the large number of witnesses he had called. This was unacceptable to Mr. Sweeten, so the trial began. Principal Eugene Leland helped present a defence of "not guilty" for the two accused men. As the trial proceeded, the witnesses were unclear in their testimony as to what they had seen. The only witness put on the stand who could bear positive testimony was a member of the Adventist church, a young girl who had been employed at the farm picking berries. She reluctantly testified that Sweeten was in the patch on the day specified and was carrying berries.

Elder Leland's defense was that the 1845 law did not include 'farmers'. Both Bro. Boettger and Bro. Sweeten were put on the stand and testified that they were farmers. Elder Leland concluded his defence by stating some principles involved in Sunday laws in general and showing that there was no Bible authority for Sunday observance.

The Magistrate made some remarks which convinced the academy men that they would be convicted. He expressed sympathy for "this people" because he believed they were sincere, but he "did not believe that anybody had a right to set a day apart different from the majority of people, on which to worship, but should conform to the day on which the majority worshipped." The trial was adjourned until the August 25th for a decision.

The September 8, 1904 edition of the Review and Herald reported:

ELDER EUGENE LELAND writes us from Lorne Park, Ontario, under date of August 26, that Brother Charles Sweeten, manager of the Lornedale Academy farm, and Brother Fred Boettger, a student in the academy, have been arrested and fined five dollars each and costs, with the alternative of a term in the county jail, for the same crime (?) of having failed to observe Sunday as the Sabbath.

=== 1905 ===
The second term of the school year 1904-05 opened on January 11 with eighteen in attendance. All the old students returned bringing others with them. A. O. Burrill observed, "If all the people in our conference could look in and hear some of the recitations, they would soon feel that this is the place for their youth.

The churches supported their school. The church in St. Thomas presented the school with "a beautiful parlor wood stove". The winter term closed with a special program held in the parlor. President Burrill attended. The principal made a few remarks then nearly all the students took part with recitations and musical selections. Some were upon the coming of the Lord, while others were upon the Sabbath, conversion, the love of God, and other subjects. Burrill considered the papers good enough for use in giving Bible studies in people's homes. "Only think, these are the children of the Ontario churches. These young people have been getting this knowledge by studying in our own school. My heart rejoiced as I listened. Of Jesus it is said that he shall see of the travail of his soul and be satisfied. I can say that when I had heard and seen, my heart was well paid for all that I have tried to do to help the school. It has been the money donated by the brethren and sisters, and that received from the sale of Christ's Object Lessons that has made it possible for this school to exist. Those who have toiled to get means to place this school where it is, will rejoice to know that their labors have not been in vain.

"A few of the students are considering the advisability of taking up the book work this summer. We are encouraging them in this idea. One of our students went out to earn means by working on the railway, but was dismissed because he would not work on the Sabbath. He is now out selling our books. This young man is engaged in the very work that will make a workman of him. God bless him. This is the kind of material that is needed in such a time as this."

Principal Eugene Leland applied his creative mind to the work of education. The school organized a regular class in "Object Lessons" in the Spring term, presumably the course included the teaching of sales skills, a marketing class. As a result, they "hoped to see a lively interest awakened among the young people in the sale of this book." He asked of his readers, "What would the friends and patrons of the school think of organizing a class in giving treatments, and employing a trained nurse as teacher? The way seems to be opening up very providentially for this kind of instruction to be given."

Brother Herbert Knister took charge of the school farm. "He is up with the lark and at it all day."

Hospitality

The academy became a stopping point for travelling Adventists. The living quarters and cafeteria did not turn them away, but the expenses needed to be covered. After presenting the problem, A.O. Burrill writes:

"Let it be understood, then, that hereafter a charge of $2.00 a week will be made to all transients, whether preachers or others. Single meals will be furnished at twenty cents each, and lodging at the same price, or forty cents per day."

=== 1906 ===
The academy provided strong out of the classroom life experiences for the young people attending. The January 4, 1906 edition of the Canadian Union Messenger reports that the printers gave up their vacation to help with the religious liberty work. This was the time of considerable political interest in Sunday legislation. These students gave up their Christmas vacation to help. In the same edition the Messenger reports on a wedding that took place in the academy parlor:

"Dr. G. W. Hill, of the Six Nations Indian Reserve, near Brantford, Ont., and Miss Leona Jackson, of the Cherokee Nation, Indian Territory, were united in marriage in the Academy parlor, by Elder A. O. Burrill, on Thursday evening, Dec. 28, at 7 P. M. The occasion was heartily enjoyed by the members of the Academy family who were present. After a dainty repast we were entertained by a piano recital by Mrs. Hill. We wish the doctor and his bride much joy and many happy days."

== Buena Vista Academy 1912 - 1916 ==
=== Overview ===
"Toward the end of that period (Lorne Park years) it became quite evident that still more commodious quarters would have to be provided. It was also felt that there should be more land to provide the young men with farm work to assist them in earning their way through the academy. As it did not seem practical to purchase more real estate in Lorne Park, nor to add further to the buildings it was decided to survey the field for some central point, with good railway service, where a modern academy building could be erected, which would have a good-sized farm connected with it.

"After some deliberation the present college site was chosen. At that time Oshawa was a town of only about 9,000 inhabitants, but was growing rapidly. Although General Motors was not then known in the town, it did boast of a large automobile factory where the McLaughlin-Buick car was made. There were also several other industries, and Oshawa even then gave promise of becoming the fine city we now know. "Part of the college land was donated by a member, and nearly every other member had a part in sacrificing in order to contribute funds toward the erection of the academy building. On arrival, the only building on the campus was the stone house which is now (1933) part of the woodwork factory. The first building to be erected was a small, square frame house, (now, 1933, the laundry and bakery) to serve as a temporary school while the large academy building was in process of erection just in front of it. Next, a small, temporary structure was put up, which served as the Ontario Conference office. After it had been used for this purpose for a year, it was moved to another point, and after undergoing several much-needed repairs it became the poultry house."

In 1911, Lornedale had become a high school, serving grades 7-12, which led to a need for more space and equipment. The school began looking for a new site, and the present site in Oshawa (east of Toronto) was acquired. The school was renamed Buena Vista Academy, and opened in 1912. The school quickly grew. In 1914, it became a Union Conference school.

=== 1912 ===
"When the time arrived to open the academy for the year 1912-13, the first year at Oshawa, quite a large number of students arrived, but there were no arrangements to house them properly. The academy building was just nicely started. The little, square building behind it was used as the dining room, kitchen, chapel, classrooms, and in the basement was the laundry and cannery. The young ladies were taken care of fairly well in the stone house, but there was no near-by place to house the boys. Most of them roomed in the farm house, (now, 1933, Brother Brown's home), but several lived in tents on the campus. One or two of the boys continued to camp long after the ground was covered by a deep blanket of snow. Each student privileged to attend during that first year still treasures the memories of the joys as well as the hardships which were the common lot of the pioneer students of "Buena Vista Academy."

The school was located on 235 acres with six buildings. They offered grades 5–12. Enrollment: 4 in elementary school, 25 in high school.

M.C. Kirkendall was chairman of the board and President of the Ontario Conference. The Principal and Business Manager was W.J. Blake. He also taught Bible and Science. Mrs. Blake was the women's dean. C.D. Terwillgar, the men's dean, Commercial and Math teacher.

=== 1913 ===
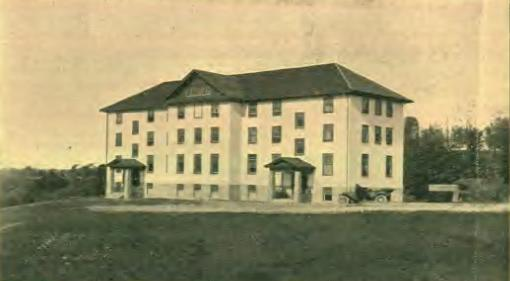
Seminary. Built 1913. Picture 1916

"At the time the opening exercises were held in the autumn of 1913, the academy building (now, 1933, the dormitory) was completed, except for the plumbing and a few other minor matters. The students of the previous year could hardly believe their eyes as they gathered in the magnificent new chapel, with such splendid adjoining classrooms. The spacious new dining room and kitchen, still giving off the odors of fresh varnish, were a rare stimulant to the appetite.

"That year Buena Vista Academy attracted to Oshawa a larger organization than the Ontario Conference. The Eastern Canadian Union Conference moved its office from Port Hope to Harmony, a hamlet midway between Oshawa and the academy. It faithfully remained near the college throughout the remaining years, until its demise in 1932. The union conference also brought with it its publishing house, "The Canadian Publishing Association," which took over

as its new home, the square frame building which had been used the previous year for the dining room and instructional departments. From that time on for several years, a number of boys earned most of their way through the academy by labor in the 'print shop.' "

"BRETHREN CHARLES SWEETEN and Clinton and Eldon Miller, who fell from the scaffolding while engaged in work at the barn at Beuna Vista Academy, are all making a rapid recovery from what was thought to be very serious injuries. The Miller boys are still in the hospital."

=== 1914 ===
"Although the academy was from the beginning an institution of the Ontario Conference, it had always served the Quebec Field. In the year 1914 it was called upon to serve a still wider area. The Maritime Conference had a ten-grade academy at Williamsdale, and it was decided to make Oshawa a continuation school for the Maritime graduates. The Eastern Canadian Union Conference at this point took over the management of the academy from the Ontario Conference, and Buena Vista Academy became a union institution. The following year the General Conference honored the academy by making it the official training centre for French workers."

M.N. Campbell, President of the Eastern Canadian Union Conference and chairman of the school board. T.D. Rowe was Principal, Bible and History teacher. Enrollment: Grades 1–8, 30; Grades 9–12, 29.

== 1915 ==
In 1915, four students graduated from Beuna Vista Academy; three from the academic program and one from the Elementary Normal Course. The March 16 academy board meeting voted to establish a French department in anticipation of the relocation of the church's education for French workers from South Laucaster to Oshawa. Also, in order to facilitate the training of school teachers, the board voted to establish a "model" elementary school in connection with Beuna Vista Academy.

== Eastern Canadian Missionary Seminary 1916 - 1920 ==
In 1912, the General Conference of Seventh-day Adventists encouraged the Eastern Canadian leadership to plan for an educational system that would train workers for Canada. They gave a significant appropriation for the building of a training school at Oshawa and authorised for the school to develop up to the fourteenth grade if required. The General Conference leaders had noticed that if Canadian young people went to the United States for their education, they seldom returned to work in Canada. This deprived the Canadian church of its most talented young people. In many cases the rest of the family followed the young people to the States. Thus the Canadian field was constantly being weakened.

A resolution passed in January, 1916, at the biennial session of the Eastern Canadian Union Conference addressed the need for a new name for the school. The name Buena Vista Academy didn't represent the work being done the school. The session voted that the name Buena Vista Academy be changed to Eastern Canadian Missionary Seminary. Each year the enrollment increased. Shortly after the war closed it was decided to build a new administration building. The old academy building became a dormitory with a cafeteria on the ground level. A large building was put up with a spacious chapel, classrooms, library, and offices. This building resolved any space problem caused by the growing enrollment. Next, a woodworking plant began operations. By 1933, six to ten boys earned their way through college each working there.

"Perhaps the greatest asset of all to the college was the location of another denominational institution beside it. At about the time the administration building was erected, the Canadian Watchman Press put up its factory a few hundred yards away. Throughout its history, the press has given students desirous of earning their way through college, the preference in its employment. Scores of students during the past few years have been enabled to get a Christian education, and enter denominational work as a result of employment during their college years at the press."

== Oshawa Missionary College 1920 - 1963 ==
=== 1920 - 1934 ===
1920

In 1920 the college was incorporated in Ontario under the name 'Oshawa Missionary College,' OMC. Church leaders chose this name for its brevity, dignity, and practicality. It communicated the location and the purpose of the school.

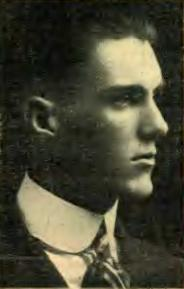
Lawrence Huntley, 1920

What kind of student attended Oshawa Missionary College? The Eastern Canadian Messenger, June 22, 1920, reported on the death of Lawrence Huntley. The account of this young man's life provides a window into school life and the kind of students who attended OMC. Lawrence Huntley (1900-1920) grew up on a farm in Scotts Bay, Nova Scotia located next to Cape Split on the Bay of Fundy. He attended Williamsdale Academy, near Truro, Nova Scotia, After graduating from Williamsdale, he came to Oshawa and attended what was then known as the Eastern Canadian Missionary Seminary. He graduated from the Seminary's academic course in 1918 and would have completed Oshawa Missionary College's Pre-Medical course a week after he died. He drowned trying to rescue some other students, May 20, 1920, in Lake Ontario, near Oshawa at the school's annual picnic. His plan was to attend the College of Medical Evangelists at Loma Linda, California.

1933

The Seventh-day Adventist Church in Canada's official periodical, the Canadian Union Messenger, published a special edition focusing on the denomination's two Canadian post-secondary institutions, Canadian Junior College in Alberta, and Oshawa Missionary College in Ontario. M.V. Campbell, in his Historical Sketch article in that 1933 edition summarized the contribution of the school: "Oshawa Missionary College, under its several previous names, has been training workers for this cause for the past thirty years. An army of ministers, missionaries, Bible workers, church school, academy, and college teachers, are now in active service who received their instruction under its auspices. It is still living up to its motto: "Service—not Fame," and is anxious to serve a still greater number of students as the years go by, until its work on earth is accomplished and our Saviour returns."

During the Depression years, enrollment decreased and some programs were discontinued, following which an improvement program was implemented in 1933.

=== 1934 - 1963 ===
Enrollment decreased again during World War II, but following the war, the college enjoyed a period of expansion.

== Kingsway College 1963 - Present ==
In 1963, the school name was changed once more, to Kingsway College, reflecting a curriculum that included a complete academic program while decreasing the implication that the school was only a Bible college.

1964, Terrance S. Carter reports the finding of the 1964 Ontario court case 'Oshawa Missionary College v City of Oshawa' with regard to qualifying for tax-exempt status under s.3 of the Assessment Act

"It is also important to note that a church can also claim an exemption...For church property that is used and assessed as a business – as long as the property is predominantly used to educate students, even though the business may employ full time employees."

In 1975, the Branson school of nursing was closed due to a change in nursing education policy by the Ontario government. This led to the decision to close the remainder of the college program and merge it with Canadian Union College in Alberta, leaving Kingsway strictly a high school.

Since then Kingsway College has followed the ups and downs that have come with the Ontario education system, including the phasing out of OAC in 2002.
