= Lacombe, Alberta =

Lacombe
- City
- City of Lacombe
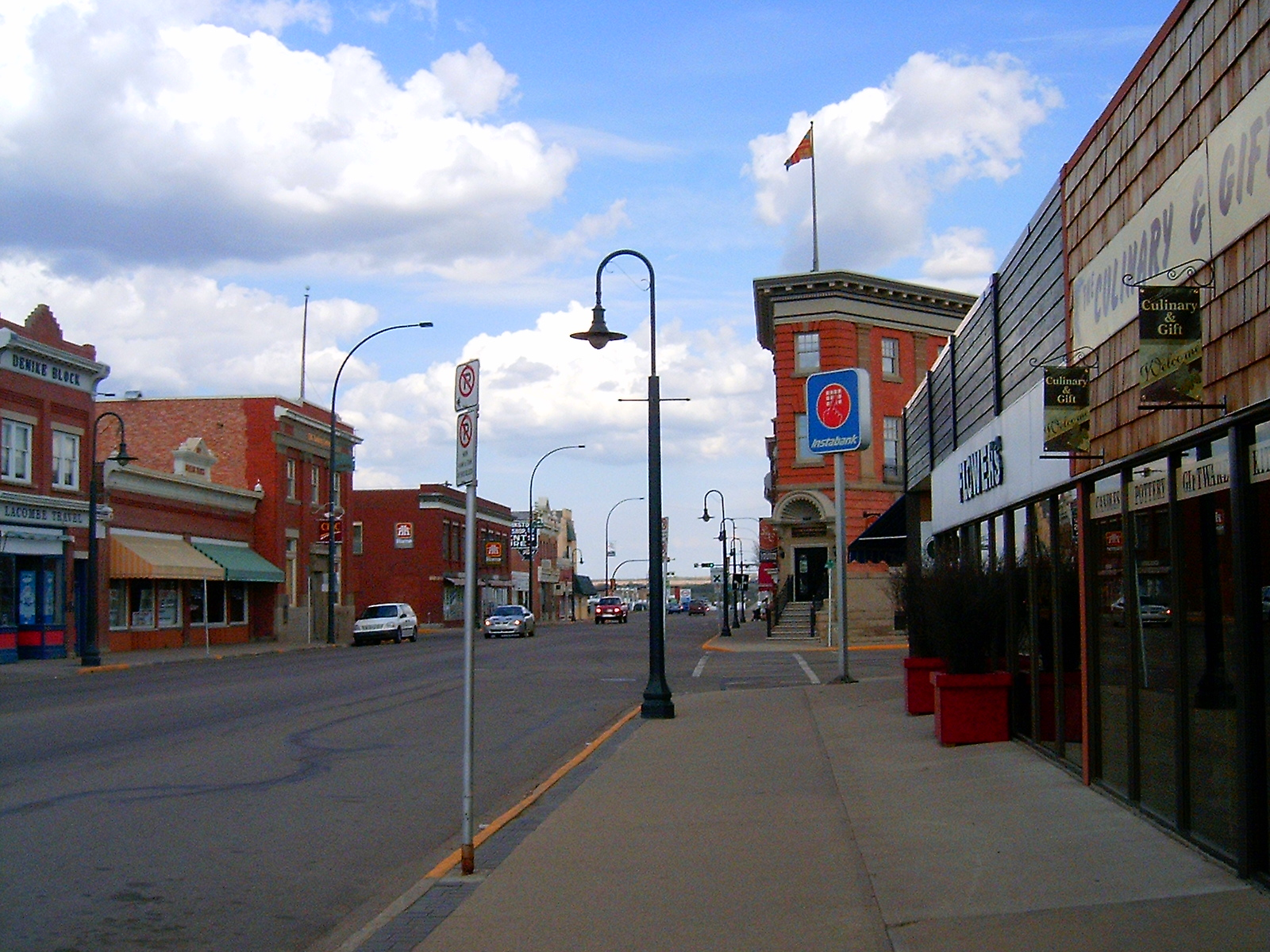
- Main Street

- Flag Coat of arms
- Motto(s): "People, Pride, Progress"
- City boundaries

- Location in Alberta Location in Canada Location in Lacombe County
- Coordinates: 52°28′06″N 113°44′13″W
- Country: Canada
- Province: Alberta
- Planning region: Red Deer
- Incorporated
  - Village: July 28, 1896
  - Town: May 5, 1902
  - City: September 5, 2010
- Named for: Albert Lacombe

Government
  - Mayor: Thalia Hibbs
  - Governing body: Lacombe City Council: Chris Contenti; Justin De Bresser; Sonja Dykslag; Torie Goings; Kim Proud; Matt Span
  - CAO: Matthew Goudy
  - MP: Blaine Calkins (CPC), Ponoka—Didsbury
  - MLA: Jennifer Johnson (UCP), Lacombe-Ponoka

Area (2021)
  - Land: 20.59 km^{2} (7.95 sq mi)
- Elevation: 855 m (2,805 ft)

Population (2021)
  - Total: 13,396
  - Density: 650.8/km^{2} (1,686/sq mi)
  - Municipal census (2019): 13,985
  - Estimate (2020): 14,109
- Demonym: Lacombian
- Time zone: UTC−06:00 (Alberta Time)
- Forward sortation area: T4L
- Area code: +1-403
- Highways: Highway 2A; Highway 12
- Website: www.lacombe.ca

Lacombe (/ləˈkoʊm/ lə-KOHM) is a city in central Alberta, Canada. It is located approximately 25 kilometres (16 mi) north of Red Deer, the nearest major city, and 125 kilometres (78 mi) south of Edmonton, the nearest metropolitan area. The city is set in the rolling parkland of central Alberta, between the Rocky Mountains foothills to the west and the flatter Alberta prairie to the east.

Lacombe became Alberta's 17th city on September 5, 2010.

== History ==
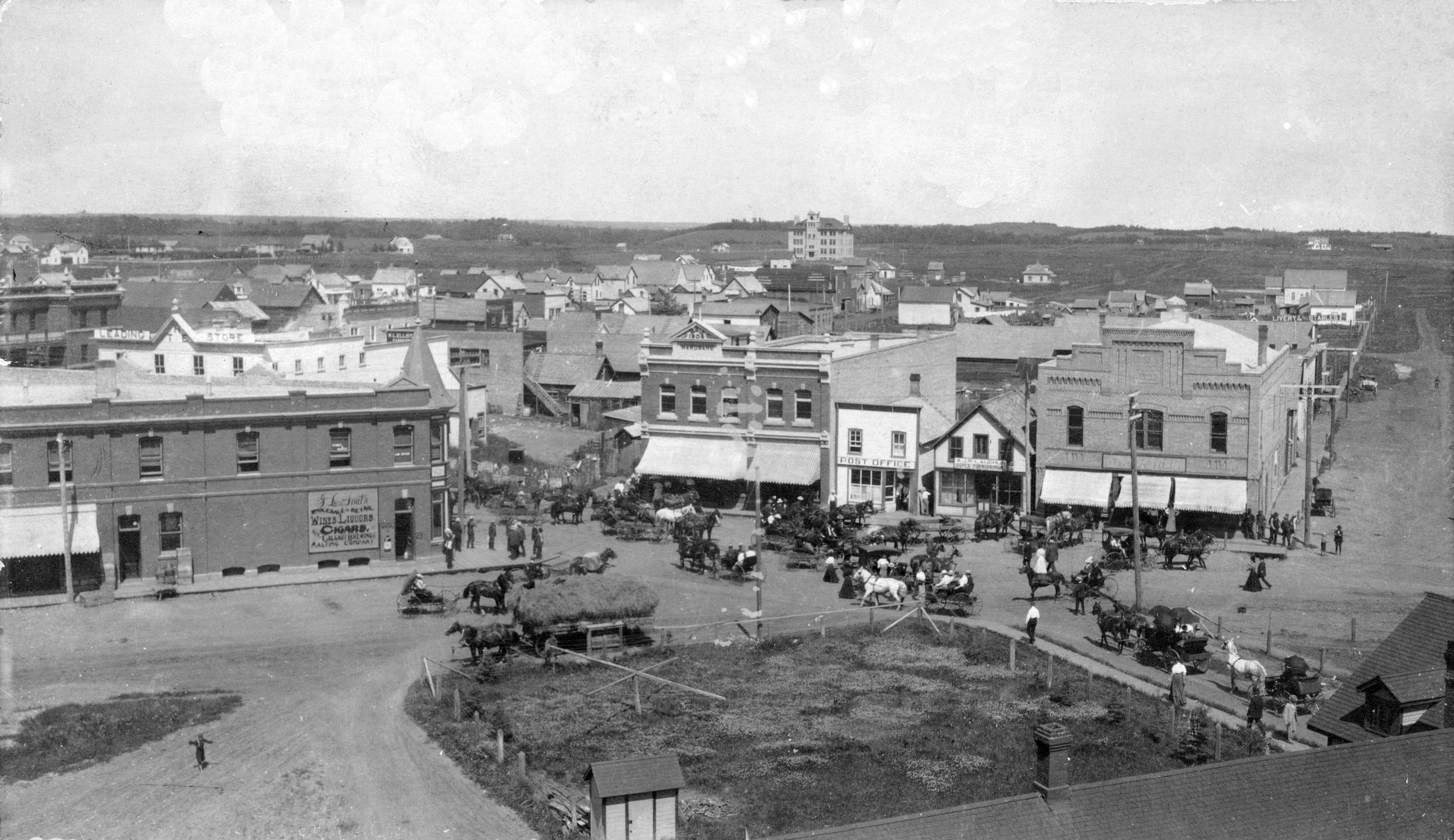
Downtown Lacombe in 1908

Lacombe is named after Albert Lacombe (28 February 1827 — 12 December 1916), a French-Canadian Roman Catholic Oblate missionary who lived among and evangelized the Cree and Blackfoot First Nations of western Canada. He is now remembered for having brokered a peace between the Cree and Blackfoot, negotiating construction of the Canadian Pacific Railway through Blackfoot territory, and securing a promise from the Blackfoot leader Crowfoot to refrain from joining the North-West Rebellion of 1885. The Lacombe Police Service have policed the community since 1900.

The first permanent settler, Ed Barnett, arrived in 1883. Barnett was a retired member of the North-West Mounted Police (NWMP) who had served a mere three years. He left Fort Macleod in August 1881 at 23 years of age. According to his own diary and his official obituary in the RCMP Quarterly, spring 1940, on July 19, 1881, Barnett was among a small NWMP party that escorted Chief Sitting Bull and his people to the Canada–US border. Along the Calgary and Edmonton Trail, he established a "stopping house" for travellers on a land grant given to him for serving in the NWMP. His family and friends moved out of Ontario and the community began to grow. The stopping house then became known as Barnett's Siding.

The Calgary and Edmonton Railway reached the area in 1891. This provided better access to the area and new opportunities for settlement. By 1893, the downtown blocks and lots were surveyed. Village status was granted in 1896, and town status in 1902.

In 1907, the federal government set up an experimental farm to research grain and livestock production. The President of the C.P.R., William Van Horne, renamed Barnett's Siding to Lacombe in honour of Father Lacombe.

== Geography ==
=== Climate ===
Lacombe experiences a humid continental climate (Köppen climate classification Dfb).

Climate data for Lacombe
| Month | Jan | Feb | Mar | Apr | May | Jun | Jul | Aug | Sep | Oct | Nov | Dec | Year |
|---|---|---|---|---|---|---|---|---|---|---|---|---|---|
| Record high °C (°F) | 15.6 (60.1) | 18 (64) | 20.6 (69.1) | 30.6 (87.1) | 33.3 (91.9) | 37.8 (100.0) | 38.3 (100.9) | 36.8 (98.2) | 35 (95) | 32.2 (90.0) | 23.3 (73.9) | 17.8 (64.0) | 38.3 (100.9) |
| Mean daily maximum °C (°F) | −6.7 (19.9) | −4.3 (24.3) | 2.1 (35.8) | 10.9 (51.6) | 17.1 (62.8) | 20.4 (68.7) | 22 (72) | 21.6 (70.9) | 16.6 (61.9) | 11.4 (52.5) | 0.5 (32.9) | −5.5 (22.1) | 8.8 (47.8) |
| Daily mean °C (°F) | −12.3 (9.9) | −10.2 (13.6) | −3.8 (25.2) | 4.3 (39.7) | 10.1 (50.2) | 13.9 (57.0) | 15.4 (59.7) | 14.7 (58.5) | 9.8 (49.6) | 4.5 (40.1) | −4.9 (23.2) | −11 (12) | 2.6 (36.7) |
| Mean daily minimum °C (°F) | −17.9 (−0.2) | −16 (3) | −9.6 (14.7) | −2.3 (27.9) | 3.1 (37.6) | 7.2 (45.0) | 8.8 (47.8) | 7.8 (46.0) | 3 (37) | −2.5 (27.5) | −10.3 (13.5) | −16.4 (2.5) | −3.8 (25.2) |
| Record low °C (°F) | −48.9 (−56.0) | −45 (−49) | −41.1 (−42.0) | −32.2 (−26.0) | −12.2 (10.0) | −5.6 (21.9) | −1.1 (30.0) | −5.5 (22.1) | −14.4 (6.1) | −26.5 (−15.7) | −37.5 (−35.5) | −49.4 (−56.9) | −49.4 (−56.9) |
| Average precipitation mm (inches) | 17.5 (0.69) | 10.8 (0.43) | 12.8 (0.50) | 21 (0.8) | 55.6 (2.19) | 75.7 (2.98) | 89.4 (3.52) | 70.8 (2.79) | 47.3 (1.86) | 16.6 (0.65) | 14 (0.6) | 14.5 (0.57) | 446 (17.6) |
Source: Environment Canada

== Demographics ==
Federal census population history
| Year | Pop. | ±% |
|---|---|---|
| 1901 | 499 | — |
| 1906 | 1,015 | +103.4% |
| 1911 | 1,029 | +1.4% |
| 1916 | 1,047 | +1.7% |
| 1921 | 1,133 | +8.2% |
| 1926 | 1,151 | +1.6% |
| 1931 | 1,259 | +9.4% |
| 1936 | 1,414 | +12.3% |
| 1941 | 1,603 | +13.4% |
| 1946 | 1,808 | +12.8% |
| 1951 | 2,277 | +25.9% |
| 1956 | 2,747 | +20.6% |
| 1961 | 3,029 | +10.3% |
| 1966 | 3,035 | +0.2% |
| 1971 | 3,436 | +13.2% |
| 1976 | 3,888 | +13.2% |
| 1981 | 5,591 | +43.8% |
| 1986 | 6,080 | +8.7% |
| 1991 | 6,934 | +14.0% |
| 1996 | 8,018 | +15.6% |
| 2001 | 9,384 | +17.0% |
| 2006 | 10,742 | +14.5% |
| 2011 | 11,707 | +9.0% |
| 2016 | 13,057 | +11.5% |
| 2021 | 13,396 | +2.6% |
Source: Statistics Canada

In the 2021 Census of Population conducted by Statistics Canada, the City of Lacombe had a population of 13,396 living in 5,194 of its 5,552 total private dwellings, a change of 2.6% from its 2016 population of 13,057. With a land area of 20.59 km^{2} (7.95 sq mi), it had a population density of 650.6/km^{2} (1,685.1/sq mi) in 2021.

The population of the City of Lacombe according to its 2019 municipal census is 13,985, a change of 9.9% from its 2014 municipal census population of 12,728.

In the 2016 Census of Population conducted by Statistics Canada, the City of Lacombe had a population of 13,057 living in 4,797 of its 5,034 total private dwellings, a change of 11.5% from its 2011 population of 11,707. With a land area of 20.81 km^{2} (8.03 sq mi), it had a population density of 627.4/km^{2} (1,625.1/sq mi) in 2016.

Panethnic groups in the City of Lacombe (2001−2021)
| Panethnic group | 2021 | | 2016 | | 2011 | | 2006 | | 2001 | |
| Panethnic group | Pop. | % | Pop. | % | Pop. | % | Pop. | % | Pop. | % |
|---|---|---|---|---|---|---|---|---|---|---|
| European (Note: Statistic includes all persons that did not make up part of a visible minority or an indigenous identity.) | 10,895 | 83.36% | 11,155 | 87.77% | 10,525 | 92.04% | 9,890 | 93.79% | 8,705 | 93.55% |
| Indigenous | 755 | 5.78% | 505 | 3.97% | 335 | 2.93% | 430 | 4.08% | 235 | 2.53% |
| Southeast Asian (Note: Statistic includes total responses of "Filipino" and "Southeast Asian" under visible minority section on census.) | 665 | 5.09% | 480 | 3.78% | 160 | 1.4% | 35 | 0.33% | 60 | 0.64% |
| African | 255 | 1.95% | 210 | 1.65% | 90 | 0.79% | 115 | 1.09% | 60 | 0.64% |
| South Asian | 205 | 1.57% | 100 | 0.79% | 110 | 0.96% | 25 | 0.24% | 20 | 0.21% |
| East Asian (Note: Statistic includes total responses of "Chinese", "Korean", and "Japanese" under visible minority section on census.) | 130 | 0.99% | 165 | 1.3% | 115 | 1.01% | 30 | 0.28% | 165 | 1.77% |
| Latin American | 100 | 0.77% | 70 | 0.55% | 80 | 0.7% | 20 | 0.19% | 35 | 0.38% |
| Middle Eastern (Note: Statistic includes total responses of "West Asian" and "Arab" under visible minority section on census.) | 55 | 0.42% | 10 | 0.08% | 0 | 0% | 0 | 0% | 0 | 0% |
| Other/multiracial (Note: Statistic includes total responses of "Visible minority, n.i.e." and "Multiple visible minorities" under visible minority section on census.) | 80 | 0.61% | 25 | 0.2% | 30 | 0.26% | 10 | 0.09% | 35 | 0.38% |
| Total responses | 13,070 | 97.57% | 12,710 | 97.34% | 11,435 | 97.68% | 10,545 | 98.17% | 9,305 | 99.16% |
| Total population | 13,396 | 100% | 13,057 | 100% | 11,707 | 100% | 10,742 | 100% | 9,384 | 100% |
Note: Totals greater than 100% due to multiple origin responses

== Economy ==
Nestled in one of Central Alberta's most fertile valleys between Calgary and Edmonton, the local economy includes a strong agricultural base supplemented by oil and gas industry.

The city is also home to the Lacombe Research and Development Centre where the first livestock breed developed in Canada, the Lacombe hog, was produced.

=== Lacombe Research and Development Centre ===
For more than a century, the federal government has funded agricultural research through a network of research centres strategically placed in almost every province. This research program has played a major role in developing the more than $120-billion Canadian agrifood industry.

The Lacombe Research and Development Centre (LRDC) is one of a network of 20 national agricultural research centres operated by Agriculture and Agri-Food Canada. The centre conducts research in field crops and livestock production relevant to the central Alberta region. The centre's main research focuses on the factors that influence red meat: yield, quality, safety and preservation. The centre also develops integrated, sustainable crop and animal production systems and crop varieties for the short-season environments of the parkland and northwestern Canada.

The LRDC developed a variety of hog called Lacombe. Work began in 1947. It took 12 years to develop the 'Lacombe' variety which is noted for its characteristics suitable to the harsh prairie environment. 'Lacombe' is 55% Danish Landrace, 22% Chester White, and 23% Berkshire. The 'Lacombe' hog was the first livestock breed to be developed in Canada.

==== Len Thompson Manufacturing Plant ====
Since 1958, Lacombe has been the home of the Thompson-Pallister Bait Co. manufacturing plant, a four generation family business that produces fishing lures, including the Len Thompson Fishing Spoon, a popular game fishing lure. The company also owns and manufactures Northern King fishing lures and True North brand wood chips and seasonings.

== Sports ==
The Lacombe Generals of Allan Cup Hockey West played out of the Gary Moe Auto Group Sportsplex from 2016 to 2019.

== Government ==
=== Lacombe Police Service ===
The Lacombe Police Service (LPS) performs municipal policing for the city. Founded in 1900, the LPS is one of Alberta's eldest police forces. As of 2020, the LPS had 23 police officers, 2 Alberta Law Enforcement Response Teams members, and 18 civilian staff (full-time, part-time, and casual). The chief of police is Jason Dobirstein.

== Education ==
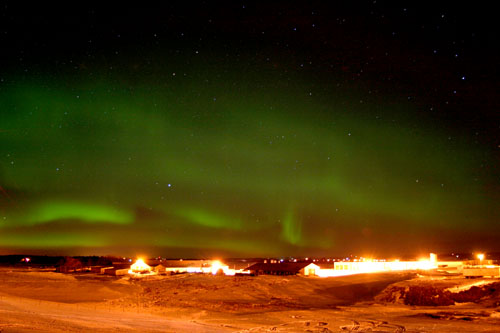
Northern Lights over Burman University

Lacombe's Seventh-day Adventist university, Burman University (formerly Canadian University College), was established near Lacombe in 1909 and continues to operate today. It and the former Hamlet of College Heights were annexed by Lacombe in 2000.

Lacombe is home to many public schools within the Wolf Creek Public School Division, including École Secondaire Lacombe Composite High School – a Grade 10-12 school with approximately 800 students that recently underwent extensive renovations completed in 2009. Other public schools include École J.S. McCormick School (K-3), École Lacombe Upper Elementary School (4-6), Terrace Ridge School (K-7), École Lacombe Junior High School (7-9), Father Lacombe Catholic School (K-9), and Lacombe Outreach School.

Lacombe's private schools include Lacombe Christian School (Preschool-Grade 9) and it has two campuses one for pre-2 and the other side from 3–9, Central Alberta Christian High School (10-12), College Heights Christian School (K-9) and Parkview Adventist Academy (10-12).

== Architecture ==
Several times, the main street of this community has been used in films, since it was remodeled to resemble a town in the early 1900s. Lacombe's Main Street is lined with restored Edwardian buildings in the downtown. Most prominent of these is the Flatiron Building which today houses the Flatiron Museum and Interpretive Centre. Downtown Lacombe is also home to the Lacombe Blacksmith Shop Museum, which claims to be "the oldest operating blacksmith shop in Alberta". Lacombe's oldest building, the Michener House Museum and Archives, was constructed in 1894. In addition to being Lacombe's oldest building, the Michener house served as the birthplace of the Rt. Hon. Roland Michener, Canada's Governor General from 1967 to 1974.

== Notable people ==
- Lacombe is home to country music recording artist Gord Bamford.
- Birthplace of Rob Cookson, professional hockey coach who has coached over 900 games in the NHL.
- Jack Cookson, member of the Legislative Assembly of Alberta from 1971 to 1982, and Minister of the Environment from 1979 to 1982.
- Bill Flanagan, legal scholar and president of the University of Alberta, grew up in Lacombe.
- Anna Maria Kaufmann, an international opera singer now living in Germany, was raised in Lacombe.
- Maureen Kubinec, Member of the Legislative Assembly of Alberta for Barrhead-Morinville-Westlock, 2012–2015
- The comedian Tony Law is originally from Lacombe, although he is now best known for his work in the United Kingdom.
- One of Lacombe's most famous residents was Roland Michener, Governor General of Canada from 1967 to 1974. A local museum and park, Michener House and Michener Park, commemorate his legacy as one of Canada's most famous and influential Governors General.
- Irene Parlby helped to found the first women's local of the United Farmers of Alberta in 1913. In 1921, she was elected to the Alberta Legislature for the riding of Lacombe, holding the riding for 14 years. Appointed as minister without portfolio, she was the first woman Cabinet minister in Alberta. Parlby was one of the Famous Five who by means of a court battle known as the Persons Case established that women were "qualified Persons" in the meaning of the Constitution of Canada and therefore entitled to sit in the Senate of Canada. A lifelong advocate for rural Canadian women and children, Parlby was president of the United Farm Women of Alberta from 1916 to 1919. On behalf of the UFWA, she pushed to improve public health care services and establish municipal hospitals as well as mobile medical and dental clinics. In 1930, she represented Canada at the League of Nations. She is the first woman to receive an Honorary Doctorate of Laws from the University of Alberta.
