= Bogenhofen Seminary =

Theology seminary and high school in Innviertel, Austria

Coordinates: 48.264999°N 13.097778°E

- Seminar Schloss Bogenhofen
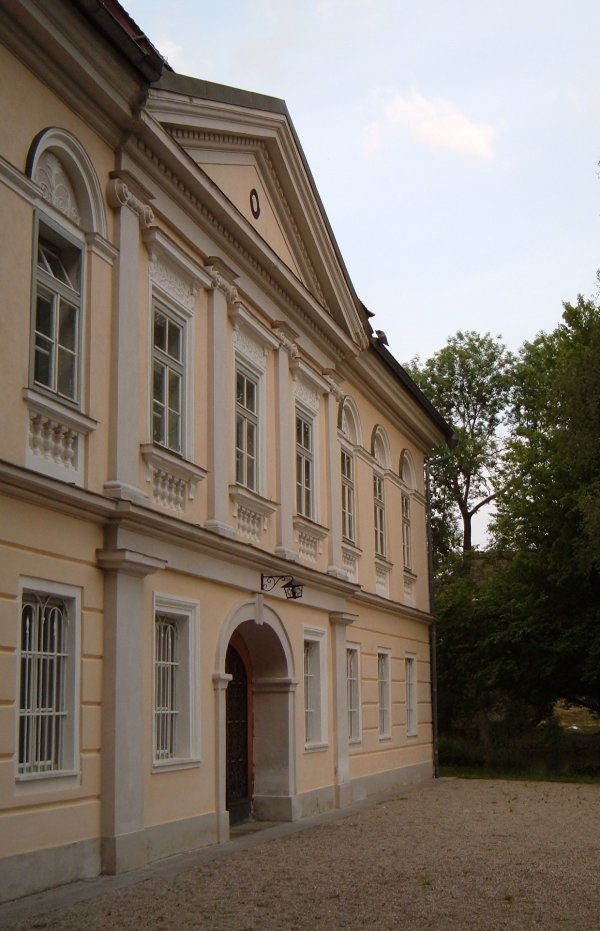
- Type: Private
- Established: 1949
- President: Christoph Berger, M.A., D.Min.
- Faculty: 5
- Location: St. Peter am Hart, Braunau am Inn (district), Austria
- Website: www.bogenhofen.at

Bogenhofen Seminary or Seminar Schloss Bogenhofen is a Seventh-day Adventist seminary of theology, Oberstufenrealgymnasium (high school), and language school in the Innviertel region of Upper Austria.

It is a part of the Seventh-day Adventist education system, the world's second largest Christian school system.

== Geographical location ==
Bogenhofen is 6 kilometres (3.7 mi) east of Braunau am Inn, in the Bezirk Sankt Peter am Hart. The Inn River runs to the north of the school. Neighboring towns are Sankt Peter (southwest), Hagenau (north), and Mining am Inn (east).

== History ==
The school is named after Schloss Bogenhofen, a manor house originally built in the 15th century. (Since the 13th century, the location had been known as "Pugenhofen", "Pubenhofen" or "Boubenhofen".) The manor passed between various noble families until the 20th century. The present classicist building dates from 1834. By the late 1940s, the building had fallen into serious disrepair. It was acquired cheaply by the Adventist church in 1949.

The school at Bogenhofen initially offered courses in seminary, nursing, and general studies. The language school was added in 1951; in 1957, it affiliated itself with the Goethe-Institut in Munich. High school instruction began at Bogenhofen in 1959. Starting in 1975, one-year instructional programs for lay missionaries were offered.

== See also ==
- List of Seventh-day Adventist colleges and universities
- Seventh-day Adventist education
- Seventh-day Adventist Church
- Seventh-day Adventist theology
- History of the Seventh-day Adventist Church
- Adventist Colleges and Universities
