= Kingsway College =

Location
- 1200 Leland Road; Oshawa, Ontario, L1K 2H4; Canada; 43.9099092°N 78.8206958°W

Information
- School type: Private Boarding and Day High School
- Motto: "Service Not Fame"
- Religious affiliation: Seventh-day Adventist Church
- Founded: 1903
- President: Sam Touma
- Grades: 9 to 12
- Enrollment: 270
- Language: English
- Area: Oshawa
- Colours: Maroon and White
- Mascot: KC Bear
- Team name: Knights
- Website: www.kingsway.college

Kingsway College is a Seventh-day Adventist high school in Oshawa, Ontario, Canada. It is a former degree-granting post-secondary institution, having offered post-secondary education from 1916 to 1975.

== History ==
The school was established in 1903 in Lorne Park, a community to the west of Toronto, now part of Mississauga, by Eugene Leland and his wife, and was then known as Lornedale Academy, and had eight students from Grades 1-9. By 1907, the enrollment had grown to 40 students.

In 1911, Lornedale became a high school, serving grades 7-12, which led to a need for more space and equipment. The school began looking for a new site, and the present site in Oshawa (east of Toronto) was acquired. The school was renamed Buena Vista Academy, and opened in 1912. The school quickly grew.

In 1914, it became a Union Conference school. In 1916, it became a junior college with fourteen grades, and its name was changed to Eastern Canadian Missionary Seminary.

In 1920, the school was incorporated, leading to another name change, this time to Oshawa Missionary College. During the Depression years, enrollment decreased and some programs were discontinued, following which an improvement program was implemented in 1933. Enrollment decreased again during World War II, but following the war, the college enjoyed a period of expansion, reaching 200 students by the end of the 1950s. In 1960, the Branson School of Nursing was opened at North York Branson Hospital, a hospital which at the time was owned and operated by the Seventh-day Adventist church; this nursing program became affiliated with Oshawa Missionary College.

In 1963, the school name was changed once more, to Kingsway College, reflecting a curriculum that included a complete academic program while decreasing the implication that the school was only a Bible college. During this time, Kingsway's choir and band rose to prominence, and began touring across Eastern Canada and New England. In 1975, the Branson school of nursing was closed due to a change in nursing education policy by the Ontario government. During the 14 years it was operational, the Branson school of nursing graduated 269 registered nurses. The closure of the nursing school led to the decision to close the remainder of the college program and merge it with Canadian Union College in Alberta, leaving Kingsway strictly a high school. There were some attempts in subsequent years to restart the nursing school, but at the present time no attempts have been successful.

Enrollment rose in the 1980s to 300 students, and a number of new buildings were constructed, including the present administration building and the A.E. King Fitness Complex. In the 1990s, enrollment dropped down to 140, and financial pressures forced Kingsway to sell off some of its industries in order to survive. In 1999, the Ontario government introduced a new curriculum, which included the phasing out of OAC (grade 13) in 2002.

In the 2000s, Kingsway's enrollment recovered, rising to 200 students. During this time, the Fraser Institute began its rankings of Ontario schools, and in its first ranking Kingsway was ranked the top academic high school in the Durham Region. Kingsway's basketball teams also began at this time. In 2017, enrollment reached 270 students.

== Academics ==
Kingsway College is a private Christian boarding high school, that offers grade 9-12 education. Approximately half of Kingsway's students live in the dormitory, while students who live nearby have the option of attending as a day student. Kingsway's boarding students come from all across Eastern Canada, and internationally. Kingsway accepts a limited number of international students each year, especially from the United States, South Korea, and China.

Kingsway is owned and operated by the Seventh-day Adventist Church in Canada. Kingsway is accredited by the Board of Regents of the General Conference of Seventh-day Adventists. Kingsway follows the curriculum provided by the Ontario Ministry of Education, and students who graduate from Kingsway receive the Ontario Secondary School Diploma.

Kingsway employs 18 teachers and 27 staff, for a student-to-teacher ratio of 15:1. Courses offered include English, math, science, French, religious studies, geography, history, music, ESL, business, accounting, law, physical education, art, computer studies, marketing, and numerous other electives. As part of the requirements for the Ontario Secondary School Diploma, all Kingsway graduates must complete 40 hours of community service prior to graduation.

Elementary education from K–8 is provided by College Park Elementary School, a private school on the campus of Kingsway College. While CPES shares some of Kingsway's teachers, the elementary school operates under a completely different administrative structure, and is owned and operated by the Ontario Conference of the Seventh-day Adventist Church.

== School organizations ==
The Student Association is headed by a Prime Minister, and is responsible for organizing many of the school functions, such as the Mega Marathon, the fall banquet and valentine's banquet, the children's Christmas party, and Golden Gnome. It is divided into the executive body and the senate, which is headed by the Deputy Prime Minister.

The school yearbook is entitled Cedar Trails. It is released each June at the Yearbook Signing night, and has been released every year since 1946. The Cedar Trails staff is also responsible for publishing the student and faculty directory, entitled the Whozit.

In Kingsway's history, there have been four student newspapers, beginning with The Studonian in 1920. The current edition, The Cedar Sentinel was founded in 1962, upon the changing of the school's name to Kingsway College. The Cedar Sentinel is published monthly, and features content produced by students, faculty, and staff.

The Vox Viri Association ("Voice of the Men") was founded in 1933 as the Men's dorm club. Among its current traditions are to go to a Chinese buffet at the beginning of the year, followed by a trip to Pearson International Airport to watch planes and fancy cars.

Nil Sine Numine ("Nothing without God's Will") is the Girls' dorm club, and it was founded in 1936. The club motto is "Deeds not words."

The Outdoor Club has been in existence since the early 1980s, and twice a year goes on backpacking, canoeing, and winter camping trips.

=== Touring groups ===
Kingsway maintains three major touring groups. These groups generally perform at local churches across Southern Ontario an average of once a month, usually for the church service. They also rotate long tours, with one group going east to Atlantic Canada, one group going west to the Great Lakes region, and one group going to any desired location each year, over either March break or the Easter long weekend.

The oldest group is the Kingsway Symphonic Choir, whose founding date is unknown. The "Kingsway Chorale" - the touring portion of the choir for some seasons - and the "Kingsway Choir" were built under the direction of Ralph Coupland in the early 1960s. Under Coupland the choir became the first Kingsway group to begin extensively touring across eastern Canada and the north-eastern United States. James Bingham continued to grow the choir in the 1970s, and under Bingham the choir toured with the famous New England Youth Ensemble and performed at the General Conference. The choir has produced many records and CDs, and has won several Kiwanis Music Festivals. The choir also performed at Carnegie Hall during the early 1980s. The choir is currently under the direction of Sharon Foreman.

Though there have been many bands throughout the school's history, including a "Lornedale Band" which played in 1912, the current edition of the Kingsway Concert Band was founded in the early 1960s under the direction of Jack McClarty. Much like the choir, the band is also highly acclaimed, has also recorded many CDs, and has won several Kiwanis Music Festivals throughout its history. In the 1970s, Ben Eby and Joanne (Klassen) Andersson were responsible for improving the quality of the band, taking the band to the newly opened Disney World, winning several Kiwanis titles in a row, and growing the ensemble into the streamlined touring operation that it remains today. At present, the band is directed by Andrew Brown.

The Kingsway College Aerials are a gymnastics team whose initial mission was to promote healthy drug-free lifestyles in teens today. Founded in 1983 by Pierre Chartier, the club continues today with an annual membership between 25 and 40. The current head coach is Allan Hodgins.

The Kingsway Drama Club was founded in 1998 by current director Margaret Russnell and Sophia Parkes. The club annually puts together a Christmas program and a spring play, which in the past has included Joseph (2003), Don't Kick the Turkeys (2004), and Sound of Music (2010). The club briefly held equal status as a touring group in the early 2000s before reverting to a normal club.

== Athletics ==
Besides the Aerials, the centrepiece of the Kingsway athletics department, Kingsway also has a men's and women's varsity basketball team, called the Knights and Lady Knights respectively. The men's and women's basketball team both compete at various tournaments, including the Cardinal Classic hosted by Andrews University. Their main rivals are the basketball team from Crawford Adventist Academy.

Kingsway also has a strong intramurals program, in which the faculty regularly play with the students. Usual intramural sports include flag football, volleyball, basketball, and soccer.

== Campus publications ==
The Chanteclair is the weekly newsletter published by the President's office, which keeps students up-to-date on the events happening around campus. It has been published weekly for many decades. By tradition, the Chanteclair periodically hides the silhouette of an animal somewhere on its newsletter, which students may identify for a prize.

The KC Contact is the alumni magazine. It is published quarterly.

== Work program ==
Ever since Kingsway was founded, students have been required to work on campus as part of their education, and as a means of paying for tuition. Kingsway's work program is a philosophical choice, and it is viewed as a key part of each student's education. Today, work options include working at one of the campus industries, in the cafeteria, in janitorial, in the dormitory, as a reader, or as an office assistant. Students also have the opportunity to continue working at Kingsway during the summer.

=== Campus industries ===
The campus' first major industry was farming. At first, it was a poultry farm. Over the years the farm has included a dairy and a strawberry field, as well as a number of greenhouses. Currently, crops grown on campus are on a corn/soybean rotation, similar to the majority of farms in Southern Ontario.

In 1911, the first printing press began operation. By 1920, it became the Canadian Watchman Press, housed in its own building. It employed many students throughout the last century, enabling them to afford a college education, until 1990 when it privatized and became Maracle Press.

In 1921, College Woodwork was founded in the basement of the Ad Building. In 1962, it moved into its present facility, where it continued to employ a significant number of students—being the largest, and highest paying, on-campus student employer—as well as full-timers, producing desks, beds, and other wood furniture. In 2016, after five years of financial losses, the College Woodwork Operating Board voted to close the woodwork.

In 1989, some of Kingsway's old greenhouses were repurposed as a garden centre. By 1996, Kingsway Greenhouse was privatized and has since become Oshawa's largest garden centre. The Kingsway Greenhouse continues to employ students and recent graduates of Kingsway College.

Other historical industries have included a printing press known as College Press, a book bindery, a health food store, a sewing industry, a laundry, and a bakeshoppe.

== Buildings ==
The Kingsway College campus includes the following buildings in a single 75-acre campus:

- Adventist Book Centre and Health Food store, also home to It Is Written Canada and the Voice of Prophecy Canada
- Adventist Community Services building
- A.E. King Fitness Centre
- Buena Vista Hall, which holds the girls' residences, cafeteria, and chapel
- The headquarters of the Seventh-day Adventist Church in Canada
- College Park Church
- College Park Elementary School
- College Woodwork factory
- Faculty housing
- Family Studies building
- H. Lofthouse Building, home to the Canadian headquarters of Christian Record Services; and to ADRA Canada
- Holm Administration building
- Kingsway College Early Childhood Centre, a daycare
- Kingsway Greenhouse, which sells flowers and trees in season
- Leland Hall, which houses classrooms
- Old Carpentry shop
- Old Gym and Music building
- The headquarters of the Ontario Conference of Seventh-day Adventists
- Maintenance shop
- Maracle Press, a printing press
- Ryan Hall, the boys' residence

=== A.E. King Memorial Physical Fitness Complex ===
The A.E. King Memorial Physical Fitness Complex consists of a gymnasium that was also designed as a convertible convention hall. The facility includes a weight room, racquetball and squash courts, a classroom, and a kitchen. The facility is frequently rented out to organizations that host annual craft shows, basketball leagues, and concerts. The weight room is open to the public year-round for a membership fee.

== Notable alumni ==
- Daniel Caesar, singer
- Wintley Phipps, singer and pastor
- Derek Sloan, Member of Parliament

== See also ==
- History of Kingsway College
- Seventh-day Adventist Church
- Seventh-day Adventist education
- List of Seventh-day Adventist secondary and elementary schools
- Education in Ontario
- List of secondary schools in Ontario
