= Lacombe pig =

Breed of pig

Lacombe
- Conservation status: Critically Endangered
- Country of origin: Canada

Traits

The Lacombe is a breed of domestic pig native to Canada. Named for the Lacombe Research and Development Centre in Lacombe, Alberta, the breed was the first strain of livestock developed in the country.

== Description ==
The Lacombe is a white, medium-sized pig with a docile temperament. The breed has large, drooping ears, is long bodied and rather short of leg, and is quite meaty in conformation. The breed has been especially selected and noted for its rapidity of gain and docility, especially the sows. Much attention has been paid to litter size, weaning weight, growth rate, efficiency of feed conversion, carcass quality, and physical soundness.

== History ==
The development of the breed began in 1947 with crosses of Berkshire sows to boars of Danish Landrace and Chester White ancestry. The goal was to produce a pig that would be appropriate for crossing with the Yorkshire, the dominant breed in Canada at the time. The Lacombe was eventually unveiled to pork producers in 1957, and quickly grew to be a popular breed in Canada. The Lacombe breed is the fifth ranking breed of swine in Canada; 1,743 were registered in 1981, of which 648 were boars and 1,095 were females.

The breeding program that founded the breed was conducted at the Canadian Department of Agriculture Research Station at Lacombe, Alberta, and was under the direction of Dr. J. G. Stothart and Dr. H. T. Fredeen. The breed was hence named after the location of the station. The foundation stock was top Berkshire sows obtained in Canada which were mated to Landrace-Chester White crossbred boars secured from the United States Department of Agriculture. Starting in 1947, 12 years of selective breeding and testing included 258 sires and 840 dams - all highly selected for performance. All Lacombes that entered the herd after 1954 were backcrossed with purebred Berkshires and those that produced any pigs with black hair were discarded. This insured genetic purity for the white color, because in swine, the white color is dominant to black. From 1954 to 1957, Lacombes were evaluated in 60 commercial Yorkshire herds in Alberta and proved to have the performance, capabilities, and meat qualities that were sought.

Lacombe boars were released to the public in 1957. The first sows were made available a year later. When released, the breed was estimated to carry 56% Landrace, 23% Berkshire, and 21% Chester White blood. Lacombes were accepted for registration by the Canadian National Livestock Records in 1957, and in 1959, the Canadian Lacombe Breeders' Association was incorporated under the Livestock Pedigree Act.

Today, the Lacombe breeding stock is held largely by a few private corporations, and is considered critically endangered by Rare Breeds Canada.
