= Christian Record Building =

- U.S. National Register of Historic Places
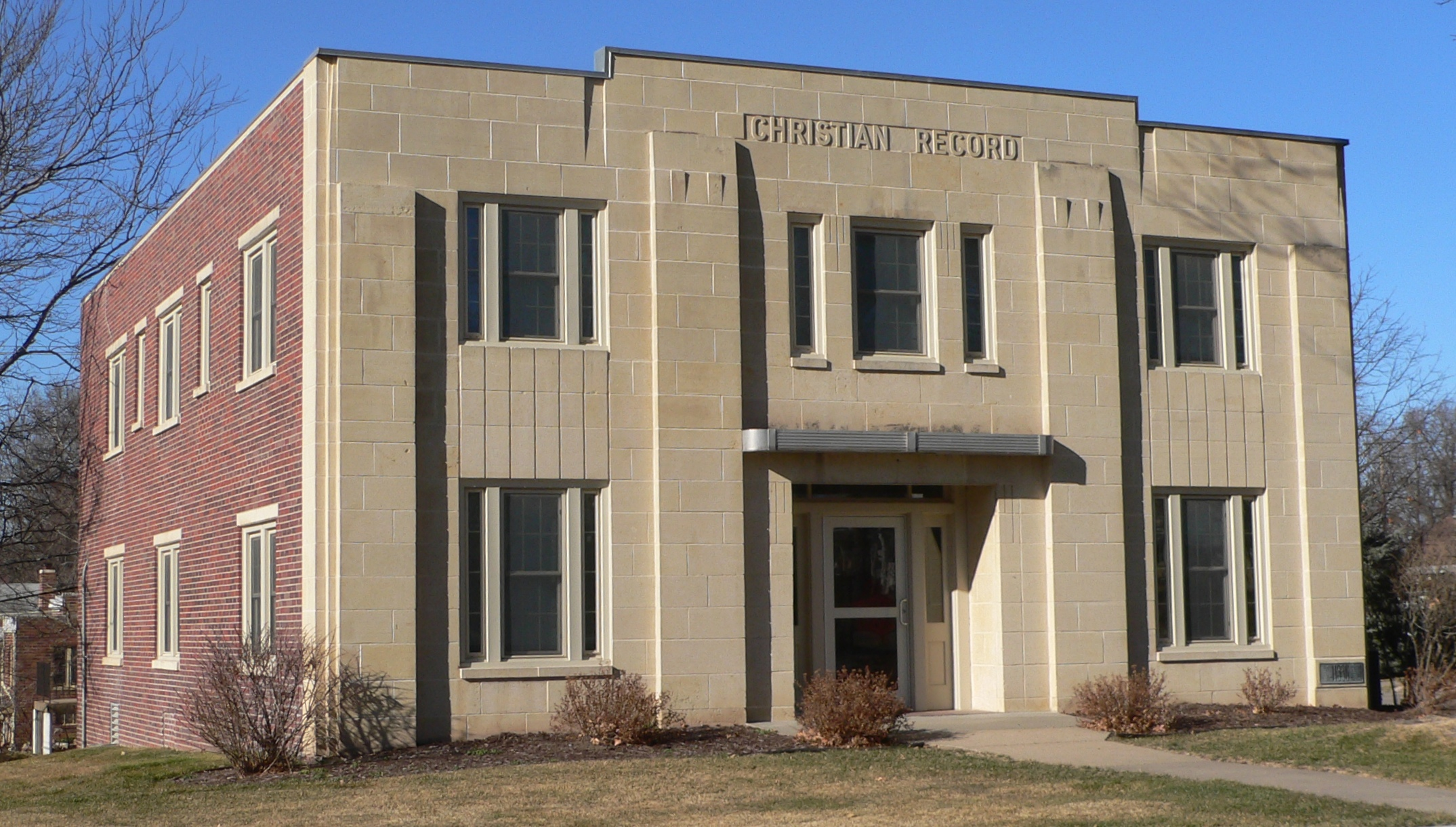
- The building in 2012

- Location within Nebraska Location within the United States
- Location: 3705 South Forty-eighth Street, Lincoln, Nebraska
- Coordinates: 40°46′35″N 96°39′12″W
- Area: less than one acre
- Built: 1936
- Built by: Felix A. Lorenz
- Architect: Felix A. Lorenz
- Architectural style: Art Deco
- NRHP reference No.: 86003384
- Added to NRHP: December 1, 1986

The Christian Record Building is a historic two-story building in Lincoln, Nebraska. It was built with red bricks and limestone in 1936, and designed in the Art Deco style. It housed the Christian Record Services for the Blind, a ministry of the Seventh-day Adventist Church. It is located west of the campus of Union Adventist University, a college affiliated with the church. It has been listed on the National Register of Historic Places since December 1, 1986.
