= Wintley Phipps =

American singer, songwriter, record producer, minister

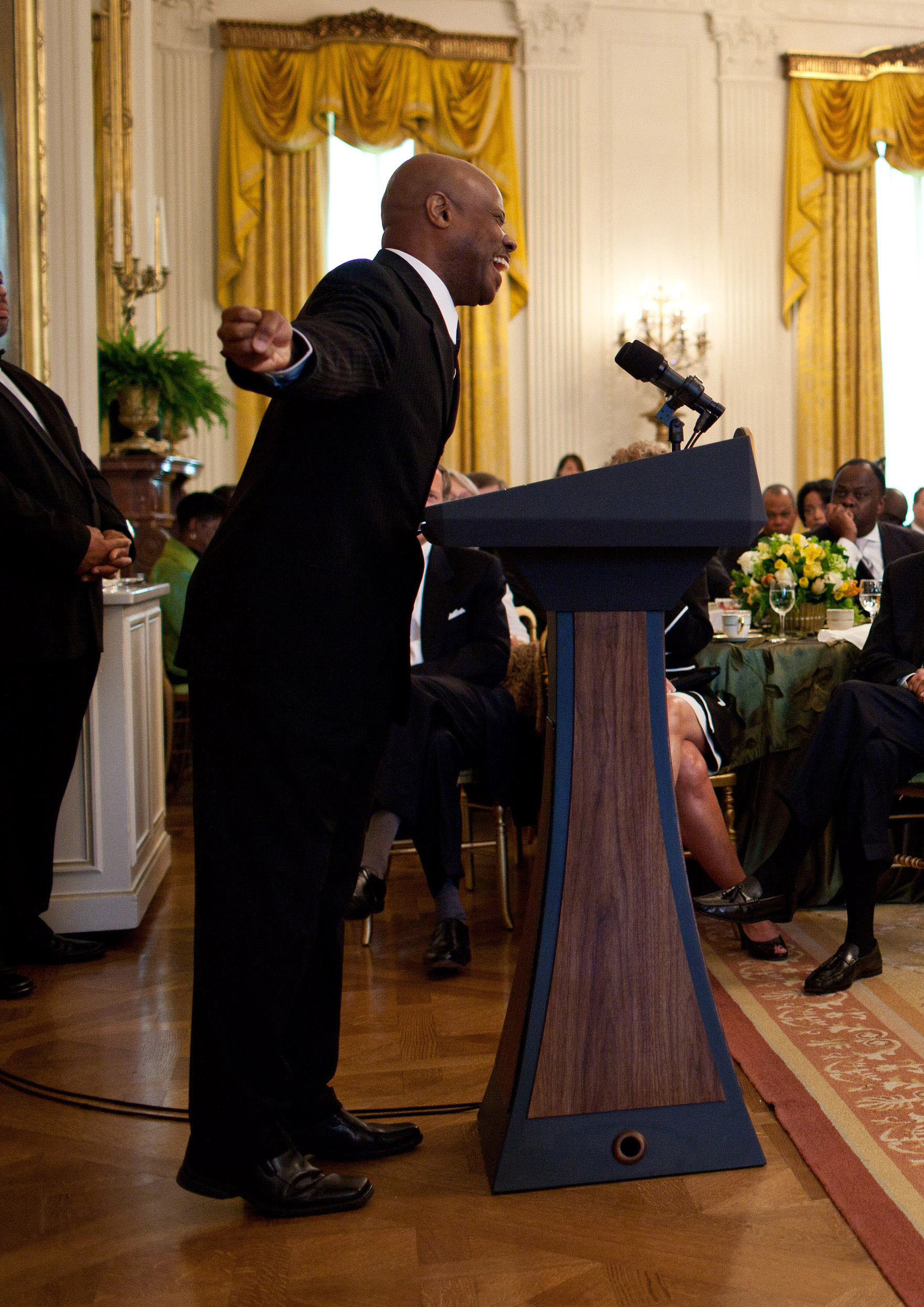

Background information
- Born: Wintley Augustus Phipps; January 7, 1955 (age 71)
- Origin: Trinidad and Tobago
- Genres: Christian, Gospel, Inspirational
- Occupations: Singer, musician, entrepreneur, Minister
- Years active: 1970s–present

Wintley Augustus Phipps, Sr. (born January 7, 1955) is a Trinidadian-American singer, songwriter, record producer, minister, and founder of the U.S. Dream Academy, Songs of Freedom Publishing Company, and Coral Records Recording Company. He features a booming bass-baritone voice, usually singing inspirational gospel music. He is an ordained Seventh-day Adventist minister.

== Biography ==
Phipps was born in Trinidad and Tobago, but at an early age moved to Montreal, Quebec, Canada. He attended Mount Royal High School in Town of Mount Royal. He attended Kingsway College in Oshawa, Ontario, Canada, a Seventh-day Adventist academy, and later Oakwood College, a Seventh-day Adventist college (university since 2007) in Huntsville, Alabama, where he received a Bachelor of Arts degree in Theology. Phipps would go on to earn a Master of Divinity degree from Andrews University, a Seventh-day Adventist university in Berrien Springs, Michigan. Wintley Phipps served as senior pastor to several churches in the Washington, D.C., metropolitan area, including the Capitol Hill and Seabrook Seventh-day Adventist Churches. He currently serves as pastor of the Palm Bay Seventh-day Adventist Church in Palm Bay, Florida. Wintley is married to Linda Galloway, whom he met at Oakwood. They have three sons: Wintley II, Winston Adriel, and Wade Alexander.

== Notable performances ==
He has performed for American presidents Jimmy Carter, Ronald Reagan, George H. W. Bush, National Prayer Breakfast for Bill Clinton in 1994, George W. Bush, Barack Obama at several National Prayer Breakfast events and his 2013 Inaugural Prayer Service and other celebrations. He performed for the 1984 and 1988 Democratic National Conventions, Rosa Parks' 77th Birthday gala at the Kennedy Center, Mother Teresa of Calcutta, and former South African President Nelson Mandela. He has appeared on programs such as the Dr. Martin Luther King Jr. television special, Dr. Robert Schuller's Hour of Power Telecast, Billy Graham Crusades, the Vatican, as guest soloist at Diana Ross's wedding ceremony in Switzerland, Saturday Night Live, Soul Train, The Oprah Winfrey Show, and the 2013 50th Anniversary of the March on Washington.

Wintley Phipps' performances also include voice over work (or voice acting) with Breathe Bible. On July 27, 2020, he sang an emotionally-charged version of "Amazing Grace" as Rep. John Lewis lay in state in the US Capitol in Washington, DC, and sang "How Great Thou Art" at Colin Powell's funeral on November 5, 2021.

== U.S. Dream Academy, Inc. ==
In 1998, Phipps founded the U.S. Dream Academy, Inc., a non-profit organization dedicated to providing a values-based, interactive, tutorial and remedial education program targeting children and at-risk youth through community Family Learning Centers located in various states. Phipps wanted something to help break the cycle he saw played out so many times in his own family. Wintley formed the U.S. Dream Academy to help children who have had a family member behind bars. The program provides mentoring, academic tutoring, and exposure to computers and the Internet. Phipps says, "Just the computers themselves are not going to transform the lives of these kids," and "The most important part of our program is really the caring, loving adults who surround them."

The Academy has garnered praise from Oprah Winfrey and former president Bill Clinton.

== Awards ==
- Excellence in Mentoring for Program Leadership Award, MENTOR
- Oprah's Angel Network $100,000 "Use Your Life" Award.
- Grammy Award nominations in 1988 and 1989
- 2005 MMP Fall Leadership, $100,000
- Philanthropist of the Year, National Center for Black Philanthropy, Inc.

== Discography ==
=== Studio albums ===
- I Give You My Life (1979)
- The Neo-Gospel Experience (1982)
- Lord, You Are My Music (1984)
- I Give You My Life (1984)
- I Choose You Again (1984)
- We Are One (1985)
- The Great Controversy (1985)
- It's Christmas Time (1986)
- Wintley Phipps (1987)
- A Love Like This (1988)
- Sun Will Shine Again (1990)
- The Power of a Dream (1995)
- Favorite Hymns (1996)
- Favorite Spirituals (1996)
- Songs of Christmas (2000)
- Out of the Night (2001)
- Heal Our Land (2001)
- Favorite Hymns of Billy Graham (Discovery House, 2005)
- Spirituals: A Symphonic Celebration (Discovery House, 2006)
- No Need for Fear (Discovery House, 2007)
- The Classics (Discovery House, 2008)
- O Holy Night! (Discovery House, 2009)
- My Greatest Romance (Coral Records, 2010)
- To God Be the Glory (Discovery House, 2011)
- Near the Cross: Wintley Phipps Sings the Beloved Hymns of Fanny Crosby (2013)
- I Surrender All (Discovery House, 2015)
- Amazing Grace (The Best of Wintley Phipps) (2018)

=== Live albums ===
- Wintley Phipps Live (2000)

=== Compilations ===
- Christmas in Vienna - Diana Ross (1993)
- Don't Let Me Walk This Road Alone (Duet with Melissa Manchester from the album If My Heart Had Wings) (1995)
- Saviour: The Story of God's Passion for His People (1996)
- Millennium Chorus: The Greatest Story Ever Sung (2000)
- Gospel Gold (Bellmark) (2000)
- Spirituals: Songs of the Soul (Discovery House, 2004)

=== Videos ===
- No Need to Fear (Discovery House)
- Spirituals: A Symphonic Celebration (Discovery House, 2008)
- Favorite Hymns of Billy Graham (Discovery House, 2008)

== Bibliography ==
- Phipps, Wintley; Down, Goldie M. (1994). The power of a dream: The inspiring story of a young man's audacious faith. Grand Rapids, MI: Zondervan. p. 186. ISBN 0-310-47920-7.
- Phipps, Wintley; James Lund (2015), Your Best Destiny: Becoming the person you were created to be. Tyndale Publishers
- Phipps, Wintley, Perfecting Me: Becoming the person you were created to be. Songs of Freedom Publishing
