= Michener House Museum and Archives =

Historical building in Lacombe, Alberta, Canada

Coordinates: 52.4643°N 113.7322°W

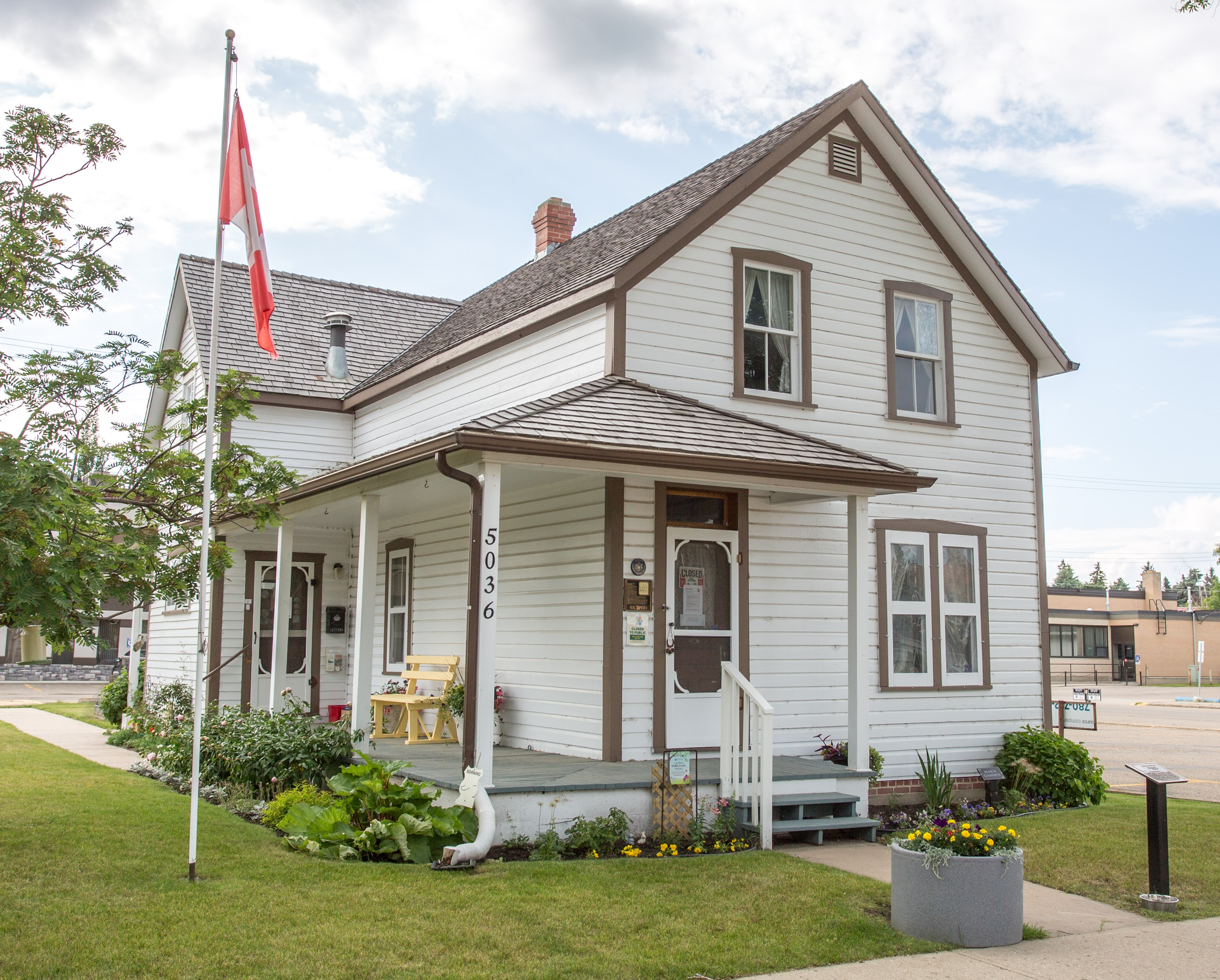
Michener House Museum in 2020

The Michener House Museum, located in Lacombe, Alberta, Canada, is a museum that is owned and operated by the Lacombe and District Historical Society. The house is the birthplace of former Governor General Roland Michener. The Michener House Museum is the oldest standing residence in the City of Lacombe

== History ==
In 1894, the Grace Methodist Episcopal Church built the house as a manse, directly north of the church. The manse and the church were built by Lacombe's first Methodist minister, E.J. Chegwin, and the methodist congregation. The building is typical of the late 19th century/early 20th century wood frame houses that became typical across North America.

In 1918, members of the church added an addition to the rear of the house, making it more spacious for its occupants.

=== Ministers ===
The following Methodist Ministers served during the years that the Michener House Museum was in use as a manse.

- E.J. Chegwin: 1893-1899
- Edward Michener: 1899-1900
- H.G. Cairns: 1901
- Wilkin Bryon Chegwin: 1902
- Arthur A. Barner: 1903-1905
- Herbert Everitt Gordon: 1905-1908
- Thomas Powell: 1908-1911
- F.W. Locke: 1911-1913
- E.T. Scragg: 1913-1916
- William Hollingsworth: 1916-1921
- J.G. Rogers: 1921-1922

=== 1922-1971 ===
In March 1922, the Grace Methodist Church, and the St. Andrew's Presbyterian church joined their congregations and formed the St. Andrew's United Church. As described by the Lacombe Globe in its centennial edition published in 1967: "This church is a rather unique institution having been in existence for three years prior to national church union." The house was sold in 1922 and became a private residence until 1971, until the Maski-Pitoon Historical Society (now the Lacombe & District Historical Society) bought the house in order to preserve the building. The Grace Methodist Church was demolished in 1984.

=== 1984–present ===
After thirteen years of preparatory work, on May 25, 1984, the dedicated members of the Lacombe and District Historical Society officially opened the doors of the Michener House Museum to the public.

== The Michener Family ==
The Rt. Hon. Roland Michener's father, Mr. Edward Michener, was originally from Almonte, Ontario. After being ordained as a minister, Mr. Edward Michener was first stationed in Banff, Alberta before accepting the post in Lacombe in 1899.

The four paintings in the parlour of the house are by Roland's mother, Mrs. Mary Michener, and depict the natural landscape from the couple's time in Banff as well as from the Ottawa/Gatineau region.

Though the Rt. Hon. Roland Michener was born in the Michener House, the Michener family moved to Red Deer shortly after his birth. The family grew to include nine children, Roland being the second eldest.

After moving to Red Deer, Mr. Edward Michener became involved in local politics and became an important political figure in Alberta. In 1904 he was elected mayor of Red Deer and in 1918 he was appointed to the Senate of Canada.

=== Rt. Hon. Roland Michener ===
Rt. Hon. Roland Michener was Governor General from 1967 to 1974 while Lester B. Pearson and Pierre E. Trudeau were Prime Ministers.

The upper level of the Michener House displays items related to the life and career of the Rt. Hon. Roland Michener. Many of the articles on display were donated by Michener himself and reflect his life as a scholar, athlete and politician.

Roland Michener was influenced by his father's involvement in municipal and provincial politics and desired to take part in public affairs. He graduated from school in Red Deer and then attended the University of Alberta in Edmonton. The U of A is Alberta's oldest post-secondary institution offering instruction since 1908 and awarding degrees since 1912.

In between his 2nd and 3rd year of studies at the U of A, Roland Michener joined the Royal Air Force (RAF). When he returned he graduated with honours and received a Bachelor of Arts in May 1920. Following this, Roland was accepted as a Rhodes Scholar and went to Oxford (along with Lester B. Pearson) where he would receive a law degree.

Upon returning to Canada and getting permission to practice law here, Michener moved to Alberta and established a law firm. He then became involved in politics eventually becoming the High Commissioner to Nepal and India and later speaker of the house in the House of Commons of Canada – which, in Michener's entire career, was his favourite job.

Roland Michener was an active and health-oriented individual who was known for his love of jogging. In 1979, he climbed Mount Michener.

Michener died on August 8, 1991, at the age of 91.

== Designations ==
On June 28, 1977, the Michener House received designation as a Provincial Historic Resource.

On September 24, 2016, the Michener House Museum was officially designated as a Municiple Historic Resource by the City of Lacombe.

Along with the Lacombe Blacksmith Shop Museum, the Michener House Museum is an Alberta Museums Association Recognized Museum.
