= Reikersdorf =

- Village of Sankt Peter am Hart
- Location within Austria
- Coordinates: 48°15′40″N 13°4′40″E
- Country: Austria
- State: Upper Austria
- District: Braunau am Inn

Area
  - Total: 0.537 km^{2} (0.207 sq mi)
- Elevation: 372 m (1,220 ft)

Population (2016-01-01)
  - Total: 280
  - Density: 520/km^{2} (1,400/sq mi)
- Time zone: UTC+1 (CET)
  - Summer (DST): UTC+2 (CEST)
- Postal code: 4963
- Vehicle registration: BR

Reikersdorf is a village in the Austrian state of Upper Austria. Reikersdorf is part of the municipality of Sankt Peter am Hart, district of Braunau am Inn. The nearby villages are Oberreikersdorf, Burgstall and Nöfing.

== Distances from Reikersdorf ==
- To the next big city (Braunau am Inn): 4,4 km
- To the state capital: The distance between Reikersdorf and Linz is about 89 km.
- To the federal capital: The distance between Reikersdorf and Vienna is about 245 km.
