= College Heights, Alberta =

Coordinates: 52°29′20.85″N 113°43′58.80″W

Location of College Heights Alberta

College Heights is a former hamlet located within the City of Lacombe that is home to the Burman University. It is located 1 kilometre (0.62 mi) south of Highway 2 and 26 kilometres (16 mi) north of Red Deer.

== History ==
Population history of College Heights
Year	Pop.	±%
1941	90	—
1951	159	+76.7%
1956	181	+13.8%
1961	261	+44.2%
1966	253	−3.1%
1971	331	+30.8%
1976	332	+0.3%
1981	267	−19.6%
1986	404	+51.3%
1991	288	−28.7%
1991A	290	+0.7%
1996	272	−6.2%
2001	271	−0.4%
Source: Statistics Canada

Prior to 2000, College Heights was recognized by Alberta Municipal Affairs as a hamlet under the jurisdiction of Lacombe County. However, its hamlet designation ceased in 2000 when it and other Lacombe County lands were absorbed by Lacombe via an annexation approved by the Province of Alberta on April 12, 2000, with a retroactive effective date of January 1, 2000.
