= Lacombe Composite High School =

École Secondaire Lacombe Composite High School

Location
- 5628–56th Avenue; Lacombe, Alberta; Canada; 52.4704°N 113.74249°W

Information
- School district: Wolf Creek Public Schools
- Superintendent: Mr. Larry Jacobs
- Principal: Mrs. Val Yaremchuk
- Enrollment: Approx. 800
- Colours: Green, gold
- Team name: LCHS Rams
- Website: https://elchs.wolfcreek.ab.ca/

Lacombe Composite High School, also known as École Secondaire Lacombe Composite High School, is a high school in Lacombe, Alberta, Canada. The school is operated by Wolf Creek Public Schools.

In 2009, the school underwent a multimillion dollar modernization project.

== Modernization ==
LCHS was constructed throughout the mid-1960s, and officially opened in time for the 1967–1968 school year. In 1999, it was determined that the school's population was 4% over capacity, and so an audit was done to determine what was needed to bring the school up to code.

Through visioning sessions in spring of 2003, a committee of staff, stakeholders, and administrators (along with Group 2 Architecture, the firm hired to design the modernization plan) met to discuss areas of improvement within the school to the public. One major priority was increasing space by reconfiguring the floor plan for more classrooms. Other major priorities included larger student gathering areas, and improved flow through congested areas.

It was originally thought that the old gym would be divided in half for use by the drama and music programs. However, the drama program was cancelled for the duration of the modernization to allow for more room for the athletics department.

One of the biggest challenges of modernizing the building was that there was very little extra space once the new gym was added. This was solved by utilizing existing space within the school.

The auditorium was another major concern. In order to create a large common area for students, the old office had to be removed. This led to the auditorium being demolished to make way for a new and improved office. This angered many people because the auditorium was the site of many concerts and productions in Lacombe. It was decided that half of the old gym would go to the performing arts department for use as an auditorium.

After three years and a budget of over $20 million, the final product was completed and revealed to the public. Improvements to the school included widened hallways, a relocated library, and an improved cafeteria and common area for students and staff.

== Fire ==
On September 27, 2010, the roof of the school caught fire. The fire lasted less than an hour before being extinguished by the Lacombe Fire Department. All 830 students along with 70 staff were evacuated.

The east wing of the roof was the most damaged part of the school. Classes resumed in the west wing and attached portables on October 12, 2010. On November 15, the common area and the west wing were reopened.
