= Parkview Adventist Academy =

Location
- 5102 College Ave; Lacombe, Alberta, T4L 1Z2; Canada; 52.4886528°N 113.7393421°W

Information
- School type: Independent High School
- Religious affiliation: Seventh-day Adventist Church
- Founded: 1907
- School number: 587-815-8800
- Principal: Dani Desjardins
- Grades: 10 to 12
- Language: English
- Colours: Blue and White
- Team name: Panthers
- Website: www.paa.ca

Parkview Adventist Academy is a Christian High School located in Lacombe, Alberta, Canada, that is affiliated with the Seventh-day Adventist Church, and with Burman University.

== History ==
Both Parkview Adventist Academy and Burman University trace their roots to a K-12 school founded in 1907 named Alberta Industrial Academy. This school was founded by Charles Burman and his wife Leona Burman, for whom Burman University were later named. The school was originally situated near Leduc, Alberta, but two years later moved to Lacombe, Alberta, where the school has remained ever since. In 1919 the school became a junior college, adding the first two years of university, and it was renamed Canadian Junior College. In 1947 the school expanded further, offering a full four-year college program, and renamed itself Canadian Union College.

In 1982, the high school portion of Canadian Union College broke off and became its own separate institution, taking the name Parkview Adventist Academy.

== Academics ==
Parkview Adventist Academy is a high school which covers grades 10-12. PAA is recognized as a fully Accredited Private School by the Alberta Ministry of Education. The school is also accredited by the Board of Regents of the General Conference of Seventh-day Adventists. The school follows curriculum guidelines set out by the Alberta Ministry of Education, and upon completion of Grade 12, students receive the Alberta High School Diploma.

Parkview maintains a student-to-teacher ratio of 10:1, employing 10 teachers and 16 faculty and staff in total. Courses offered include math, English, social studies, religious studies, physical education, biology, physics, chemistry, and numerous electives.

== Extracurriculars ==
The Parkview Panthers compete in the Central Alberta Schools Athletic Association, where they compete as a 2A school in boys and girls volleyball and basketball. They also compete in tournaments hosted by the Canadian Adventist Schools Athletic association, by Walla Walla University, and by Burman University, in flag football, soccer, volleyball, baseball, and hockey.

Parkview students also participate in Burman University's Acronaires program, a touring gymnastics team; as well as in Burman's Choral Union, a touring choir which frequently tours across North America, Europe, and Asia.

== See also ==
- Seventh-day Adventist Church
- Seventh-day Adventist education
- List of Seventh-day Adventist secondary and elementary schools
