= Burman University =

Seventh-day Adventist college in Alberta, Canada

- Motto: Think. Believe. Act.
- Type: Independent University
- Established: 1907
- Religious affiliation: Seventh-day Adventist, Christian
- Academic affiliations: La Sierra University, Andrews University
- President: Loren Agrey
- Students: 334 (2025)
- Location: Lacombe, Alberta, Canada; 52.4880°N 113.7385°W
- Colours: Red & white
- Nickname: Burman Bobcats
- Website: www.burmanu.ca

Burman University is an independent publicly funded university located in Lacombe, Alberta, Canada. It is sponsored by the Seventh-day Adventist Church in Canada. It is a part of the Seventh-day Adventist education system, the world's second largest Christian school system. By date of founding, it is the oldest university in Alberta. The school's official mission statement is to educate learners to think with discernment, to believe with insight and commitment and to act with confidence, compassion, and competence. The university places emphasis on service in local and global communities.

== Campus ==
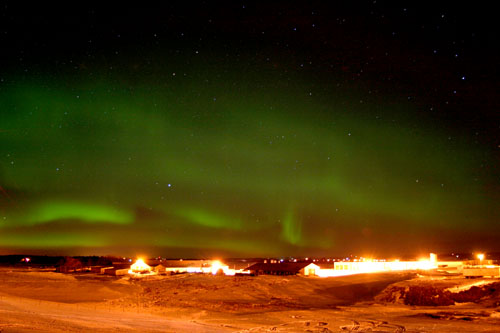
Northern Lights over Burman University in Lacombe.

Burman University is located in Lacombe, Alberta, on top of a hill overlooking Barnett Lake. Lacombe is located less than half an hour away from Red Deer, an hour away from Edmonton, and an hour and a half away from Calgary.

The campus consists of 17 buildings. These buildings include the administration building, the College Heights Seventh-day Adventist Church, the College Heights Christian School (for K-9 students), Parkview Adventist Academy (for grade 10-12 students), the Chan Shun Science Centre, West Hall (arts, English, and music), the McKibbin Centre (education), the Physical Education centre, and a few other buildings.

Burman operates four residences for students. Lakeview Hall and Maple Hall are co-educational dormitories; men and women live on opposite wings of each dorm. Lakeview is for first and second year students; Maple Hall is for third and fourth year students. Riverton Hall is a co-educational dormitory for third and fourth year students; Riverton has suites instead of dorm rooms, and is divided into gender-specific halls. Redstone is an honour house for older female students.

== Academics ==
Burman University is accredited by the Adventist Accrediting Association. The Province of Alberta, through the Minister of Advanced Education, grants Burman University the right to award degrees; programs offered at Burman University are approved by the Campus Alberta Quality Council. Burman University is owned and operated by the Seventh-day Adventist Church in Canada.

Burman employs 35 full-time faculty, and 41 Ph.D. faculty overall. Burman's students come from 37 countries, and Burman boasts a 13:1 student-to-professor ratio.

=== School of Education ===
Burman's school of education is one of the oldest programs at Burman. Initially beginning as a four-year degree offered through Union College, Burman began awarding the Bachelor of Education under its own charter once approval was granted by the Province of Alberta in 2004. Burman currently awards the Bachelor of Education with majors in Elementary or Secondary education, with specializations in biology, business, English, mathematics, music, religious studies, and social studies; and additional minors in art, chemistry, French, physical education, and physical science, as well as minors in all of the previously named specializations. In 2017, 29% of Burman graduates received a Bachelor of Education degree, making the School of Education one of the largest programs at Burman. The school of education is currently led by Chloe Weir.

=== School of Business ===
Burman has a school of business which offers the Bachelor of Business Administration, with tracks in accounting, human resource management, international business, marketing, and management. Burman's school of business also offers a three-year business degree as a Bachelor of Arts, without a speciality track; as well as a minor.

=== Other programs ===
Burman's other programs are divided into a Division of Arts and a Division of Science, which lead to various majors and minors for the Bachelor of Science and Bachelor of Arts degrees. A few departments are notable enough to have their own chairs: these include Music (which offers a Bachelor of Music degree), English, Religious Studies, Biology, Psychology, Outward Pursuits, and Wellness; each of these departments offers a major in their field.

== Affiliations ==
Burman has articulated program agreements with a few Seventh-day Adventist universities, which allow students to begin programs at Burman and finish them at the other university. Burman offers a Bachelor of Social Work from La Sierra University, and also offers an Extended Campus Program from La Sierra University during the summer. Burman also offers a Master of International Development Administration from Andrews University. In 2019, Burman began an articulated program agreement with Kettering College, allowing Burman to offer the first three semesters of Kettering's Bachelor of Nursing program.

Burman also has an articulated program agreement with Red Deer College, which allows students from RDC to transfer into Burman's Business, Education, and Music programs.

Burman, like all Adventist colleges and universities, allows its students to attend other Adventist universities in France, Austria, Spain, Argentina, Italy, and Germany for a year through the Adventist Colleges Abroad program, in pursuit of a learning a second language.

Parkview Adventist Academy (10-12) and College Heights Christian School (K-9) operate on the campus of Burman University. While they have separate administrative structures, they share many of Burman's facilities. Additionally, Burman's education students are involved at each school, for observation and practicum.

== Student life ==
The Burman University Student Association (BUSA) is the student association at Burman University.

Students at Burman University publish a newspaper, named the Aurora Chronicles, and a yearbook, named the Aurora Borealis.

Campus Ministries is responsible for the spiritual life of students on campus. Campus Ministries is led by student chaplains, in co-ordination with the university's chaplains. Campus Ministries provides a number of service opportunities for Burman students, such as a soup kitchen, sunshine bands, and mission trips. A number of Burman University students choose to take a year off of school to travel overseas and serve as a student missionary for a year.

== Athletics ==
Burman University has a number of athletics teams which its students may compete in.

The Acronaires are a touring gymnastics group, founded in 1973, which performs shows at schools and communities across Canada and around the world. Their mission is to encourage healthy lifestyles and promote athletic involvement among young people. They also offer a children's acrobatics program for local children in their community.

Burman offers indoor soccer, volleyball, and basketball teams for both men and women, and they also offer a men's ice hockey team. Burman's teams had previously competed in the Alberta Colleges Athletic League prior to the collapse of that organization in 2015. Burman then made two applications to join the Alberta Colleges Athletic Conference, but both applications were rejected in light of Burman's inability to play games on the sabbath, as observed by the Seventh-day Adventist Church. Without a conference, Burman was forced to schedule exhibition games to fill out its schedule for a few years. In 2018, Burman was granted permission to join the Prairie Athletic Conference, which consists of colleges in Saskatchewan and Alberta. The current athletic director is Ron Schafer.

PAC Provincial Championships

- Men's Basketball (2) (2019, 2021)
- Women's Basketball (1) (2021)
- Men's Futsal (1) (2019)
- Women's Futsal (1) (2019)

ACAL Championships

- Men's Basketball (5) (2010, 2011, 2012, 2013, 2015)

== Music ==
Burman University's music department was founded in 1949, but music has been a part of the university since the beginning. Perlie Park Adams taught the first choir, in 1910. The current choir was named the Choral Union in 1977, under the leadership of current director Wendolin Pazitka-Munroe. The choir was given that name because it consisted of both university students and students from Parkview Adventist Academy. The Choral Union is highly acclaimed, and has sung across Europe, 47 of the 50 United States, Latin America, and China. They have also sung at Carnegie Hall on three occasions, sung for the Premier of Alberta on three occasions, sung with the Lions Gate Sinfonia, and have collaborated with John Rutter and Jonathan Willcocks. The membership of the choir fluctuates between 100 and 120 singers each year.

In addition to the choir, Burman also has an orchestra under the direction of Eduardo Sola, which also tours extensively and frequently accompanies the Choral Union. The Burman University orchestra dates back to the 1920s, having been founded by Fred Jerome. The Burman University band, which is currently named the Silverwinds concert band, was also founded by Fred Jerome.

Burman University's music department has hosted a Sunday at 4 concert series for decades (previously named Sunday at 7). This concert series invites classical musicians from around the world to perform for a general admission audience.

== History ==
Burman University traces its roots to the first Seventh-day Adventist secondary school in Alberta, Alberta Industrial Academy, established in 1907 in Leduc by Charles and Leona Burman, merely two years after Alberta became a province of Canada.

=== The Leduc School ===
Canadian University College traces its roots to Alberta Academy, the first Seventh-day Adventist secondary school in Alberta. It began operations in January 1907 in Leduc. That first year, the school located in a rented building in town. The conference vote to conduct a three-month canvasser's school had become a reality. Initially this school began as a training ground for colporteurs, named The Canvassers' School.

They held their first chapel exercise, at nine a. m. Friday, January fourth. Nine students were present. In the next three weeks the number had increased to seventeen. Student nationalities reveal the cultural diversity of pioneer life in Alberta: English, Scotch, French, Swede, German, Canadian and mixtures from the States.

Subjects taught included Bible, grammar, geography, physiology, arithmetic, reading and "Great Controversy". They planned to study other books as soon as it was determined which books would be sold in the Alberta Conference in the upcoming sales season. This illustrates the "Canvassers" nature of the curriculum. But, the Alberta Conference leadership had a broader vision for this school. Alberta Conference president, and principal of the school, C. A. Burman states, "a seed has been sown which will ripen into a well equipped intermediate school in due season."

An elementary church school started in that same month of January in the same rented building with Effie Russell Olson as teacher.

Within a year, the Alberta conference had purchased a farm of 160 acres three miles west of Leduc. They erected temporary buildings on the farm so the school, Alberta Industrial Academy, could operate there in the next school year. A farm school better suited their educational ideals. Students could do work on the farm and be free from distracting influences of town life. The farm came with 100 acres of cultivated timothy grass, considered a valuable crop. President Burman and his wife lived on the farm and had charge of the school during this early formative period. There were 36 students and three teachers.

Forty-nine students enrolled for the 1908–1909 school year; most of them "mature young men". The weather that winter was severe. "For several nights the thermometer registered 50° to 60° below zero," the boys' dean, Joseph L. Stansbury, writes, "and we are not very well protected from cold. Some of the coldest nights it registered as low as 20° below zero in our sleeping-rooms. Two families are living in tents on the school farm, that they may have the advantages of the school. In spite of all this exposure and the bitter cold, we are all enjoying good health. Nothing more serious has resulted than a few frosted ears, noses, fingers, and toes. We are confident that students who cheerfully endure these disagreeable features, and do not allow our meager and inadequate accommodations to hinder or discourage them in their educational work, are gaining an experience that will be a very essential qualification for missionary work in foreign countries, where there are so many obstacles to be overcome..."

In 1909, the school purchased a site near Lacombe consisting of over 1,200 acres of farmland. The new high school was built on top of a hill that overlooked the campus. Classes begun before construction had completed, leading to students sleeping in a barn and in tents during the first semester at Lacombe. Eventually, a small village named College Heights, Alberta sprung up around the school to support the institution. Enrolment rose quickly during the first few years, from 61 students to 223, and the school went through a number of name changes in a short span of time. In 1919, the school added a post-secondary program and was renamed Canadian Junior College. The following year, it became one of two Seventh-day Adventist colleges in Canada; Canadian Junior College served Western Canada while Oshawa Missionary College served Eastern Canada.

In May 1930, an arsonist burned down the administration building, the industrial building, and the men's dormitory, leaving several students badly injured and in need of hospitalization. The school quickly rebuilt and the new buildings were re-opened that November. The school struggled financially during the 1930s as a result of the Great Depression, with enrolment dropping below 100. Battleford Academy, another Seventh-day Adventist school in Saskatchewan, was merged with Canadian Junior College in an effort to save money. After World War II, a post-war boom increased enrolment above 300, and allowed the school to pay off debts from reconstructing the administration building.

=== Canadian Union College ===
In 1947, the school became a senior college and was renamed Canadian Union College, becoming the primary post-secondary institution for the Canadian Union Conference of Seventh-day Adventists. That same year, it began its first four-year program in theology. A music department was founded soon after, in 1949.

In 1958, the General Conference of Seventh-day Adventists recommended that Canadian Union College pursue provincial accreditation. A large construction program began, and several new buildings were constructed, in an effort to win accreditation. However, the government of Alberta did not allow private institutions to grant degrees at this time, and so no accreditation came; and the school was left heavily in debt. At this time Oshawa Missionary College (now Kingsway College) was facing similar accreditation issues for its own post-secondary programs. Beginning in the 1970s, Canadian Union College began pursuing a series of affiliation programs, to enable its students to study at CUC and get a degree. In 1971, CUC affiliated itself with the University of Alberta, and through this program it offered first-year and later second-year university courses. In 1979, CUC began an affiliate program with Union College, a Seventh-day Adventist university in Nebraska, which allowed CUC to begin offering three-year and four-year degree programs. Some programs CUC was able to offer through Union College included a Bachelor of Education program and a Bachelor of Arts degree. In 1983, CUC affiliated with Walla Walla College in order to offer the first two years of Walla Walla's engineering program. Kingsway College also attempted to gain affiliations with Adventist universities in the United States, but failed to do so; and furthermore, because the Ontario government changed how nurses were educated in the province, Kingsway lost its nursing program, in 1975. This led to the Canadian Union voting to close Kingsway's post-secondary program and merge it with CUC, in 1977.

In 1981, the Canadian Union of Seventh-day Adventists voted to separate the high school and college divisions of CUC into separate institutions. The high school division was renamed Parkview Adventist Academy in 1982. At the time of its separation, Parkview had an enrolment of 316. Due to its close proximity to CUC, it shared and continues to share a number of facilities with the university, such as the dormitory and the music program.

In 1984, the province of Alberta created the "Private Colleges Accreditation Board," which allowed private schools in Alberta to apply for the right to become a degree-granting university. In 1991, Canadian Union College became one of the first four private institutions in Alberta given the ability to grant bachelor's degrees. The first Bachelor's programs to receive accreditation were three-year degrees in English, Music, and Religious Studies. Several other programs were quickly added during the next decade. CUC continued to offer other degrees through Union College at this time.

=== Canadian University College ===
In 1997, CUC's name was changed to Canadian University College. Three years earlier, in 1994, the board of trustees for the college decided to change the name. They gave two reasons for doing so: Adventist Canadian headquarters had changed their name from the Canadian Union Conference to the Seventh-day Adventist Church in Canada. Outside of Adventist circles, people usually associated the term 'union' with 'organized labour'. The second reason was that the word 'college' did not accurately reflect the school's three- and four-year degree-granting status. In Canada, the word 'college' had become associated with two-year under-graduate community and vocational institutions. A name change committee was established. This committee appealed to the college's constituency, the Seventh-day Adventist membership in Canada, to suggest possible names. The name change allowed the university to keep its initials. The change to "University College" was also made in conjunction with the other three private institutions in Alberta which had been allowed to grant degrees. In 2000, College Heights was annexed into the growing city of Lacombe.

Because CUC had gained the ability to grant its own degrees, its affiliate programs were slowly wound down and replaced with programs under the university's own charter. The Union College affiliate program ended in 2008, after CUC was granted the right to award the Bachelor of Education degree. In July 2014 the Alberta Government gave permission for Alberta's now five independent publicly funded institutions to change status from "university college" to "university". As a result, in December 2014, the Canadian University College Board of Trustees approved changing the university's name from Canadian University College to Burman University. The name Burman University was chosen in honour of Charles and Leona Burman who founded the institution in 1907. The name change was made official on 1 May 2015.

== See also ==
- List of Seventh-day Adventist colleges and universities
- Seventh-day Adventist education
- Seventh-day Adventist Church
- Seventh-day Adventist theology
- History of the Seventh-day Adventist Church
