= College Woodwork =

Canadian furniture manufacturer

College Woodwork's latest furniture series "Clarington"

College Woodwork was a century-old furniture manufacturer located in Oshawa, Ontario, Canada, and a subsidiary of Kingsway College. College Woodwork was originally a woodworking class for students attending Lornedale Academy and today provides employment for students of Kingsway College.

== History of college ==
College Woodwork C.1930

College Woodwork began in the early 1900s as a woodworking class for students attending Lornedale Academy. For both philosophical and economic reasons, work was viewed as an essential component of education. By 1920, the woodworking class had grown into a business producing small household items such as trellises, playpens, potty chairs, ladders and ironing boards. Furniture was a natural extension of the product line, and by the early 1960s, production focused on simple furniture.

The business closed in 2016.

== Key people ==
- Sheldon Smith, President
- George Ryan, Vice President
- Anna Wojtczak, Human Resources Manager
