= Rob Cookson =

Canadian professional ice hockey coach

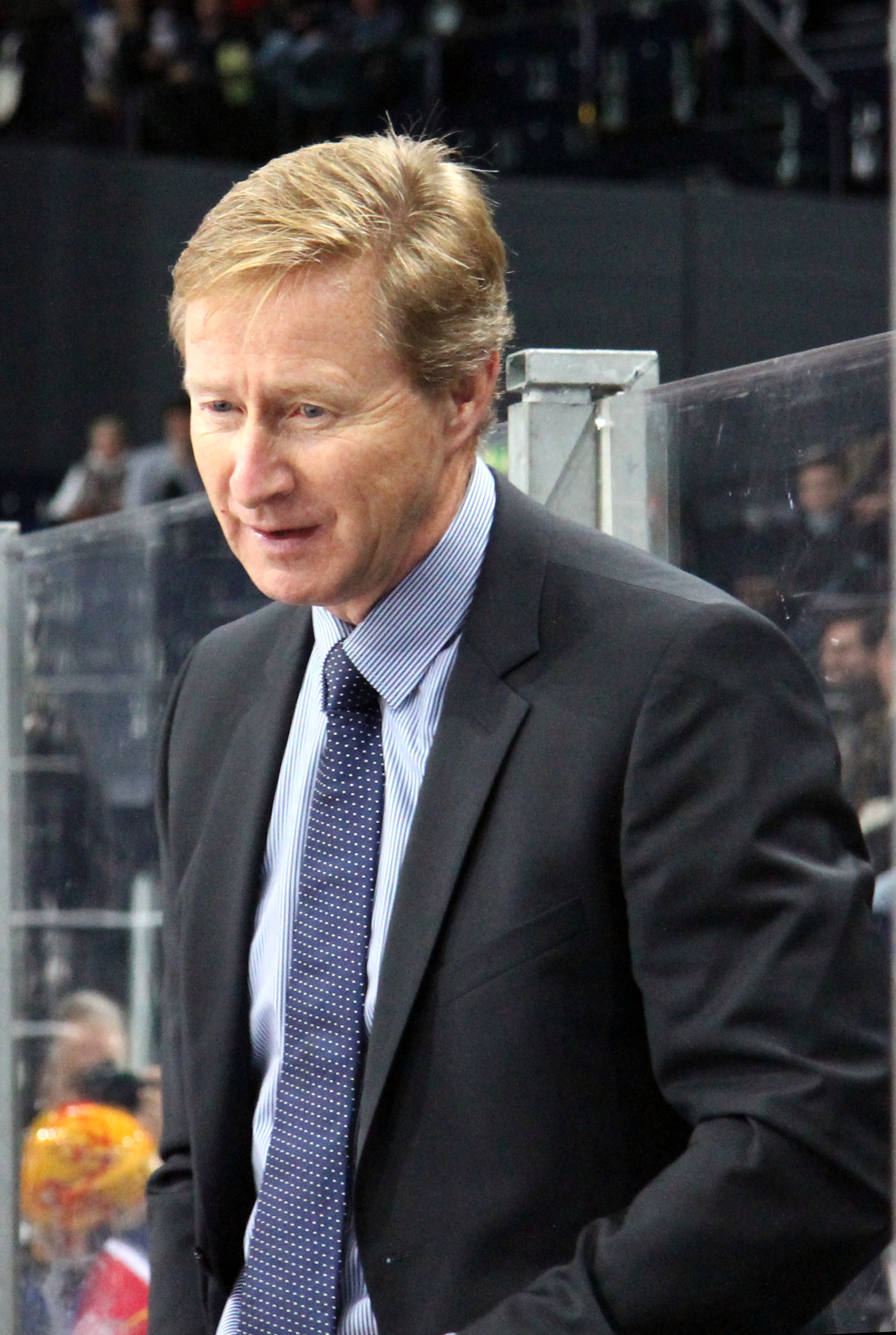
Rob Cookson in October 2014

Rob Cookson (born January 25, 1961, in Lacombe, Alberta) is a Canadian professional ice hockey coach for the Lausanne HC.

== Career ==
Cookson, who did not play professional ice hockey, worked for Hockey Canada as manager of video production beginning in 1991, attending several international tournaments as a member of Team Canada's coaching staff, including the 1994 and 1998 Olympic Games, Men's and Junior World Championships. As an assistant coach, he helped Team Canada win silver at the Olympic Games in Lillehammer, and gold at the 1997 and 2003 World Championships as well as at the 1995, 1996, 1997 and 2004 Junior World Championships. His responsibilities included video preparation, analysis and video pre-scouting.

In March 1998, he was named video coordinator of the Philadelphia Flyers of the National Hockey League (NHL). He lasted three years in that job and then was signed by the Calgary Flames as an assistant coach in 2001. He parted ways with the Flames at the end of the 2010-11 season.

In the 2011-12 season, Cookson served as assistant coach of the University of Calgary men's ice hockey team.

Cookson was assistant coach of the ZSC Lions of the Swiss top-flight National League A (NLA) from 2012 to 2016, serving under head Marc Crawford. Under their guidance, the Lions won the Swiss national championship in 2014, the Swiss cup competition in 2016 and three NLA regular season championships (2013–14, 2014–15, 2015–16).

In December 2015, he was named to the coaching staff of Team Canada for the Spengler Cup, serving as an assistant. Canada ended up winning the prestigious tournament.

On June 15, 2016, he was named as an assistant coach of the Ottawa Senators of the National Hockey League (NHL), serving under head coach Guy Boucher and reuniting with associate coach Marc Crawford. On December 21, 2019, Cookson was named assistant coach at HC Lugano (Switzerland).

In November 2021 he was named an assistant coach with the Chicago Blackhawks.

In June 2025, Cookson signed a two-year contract to be assistant coach with the Lausanne HC in the Swiss National League.
