= Lacombe Blacksmith Shop Museum =

Coordinates: 52.4636°N 113.7290°W

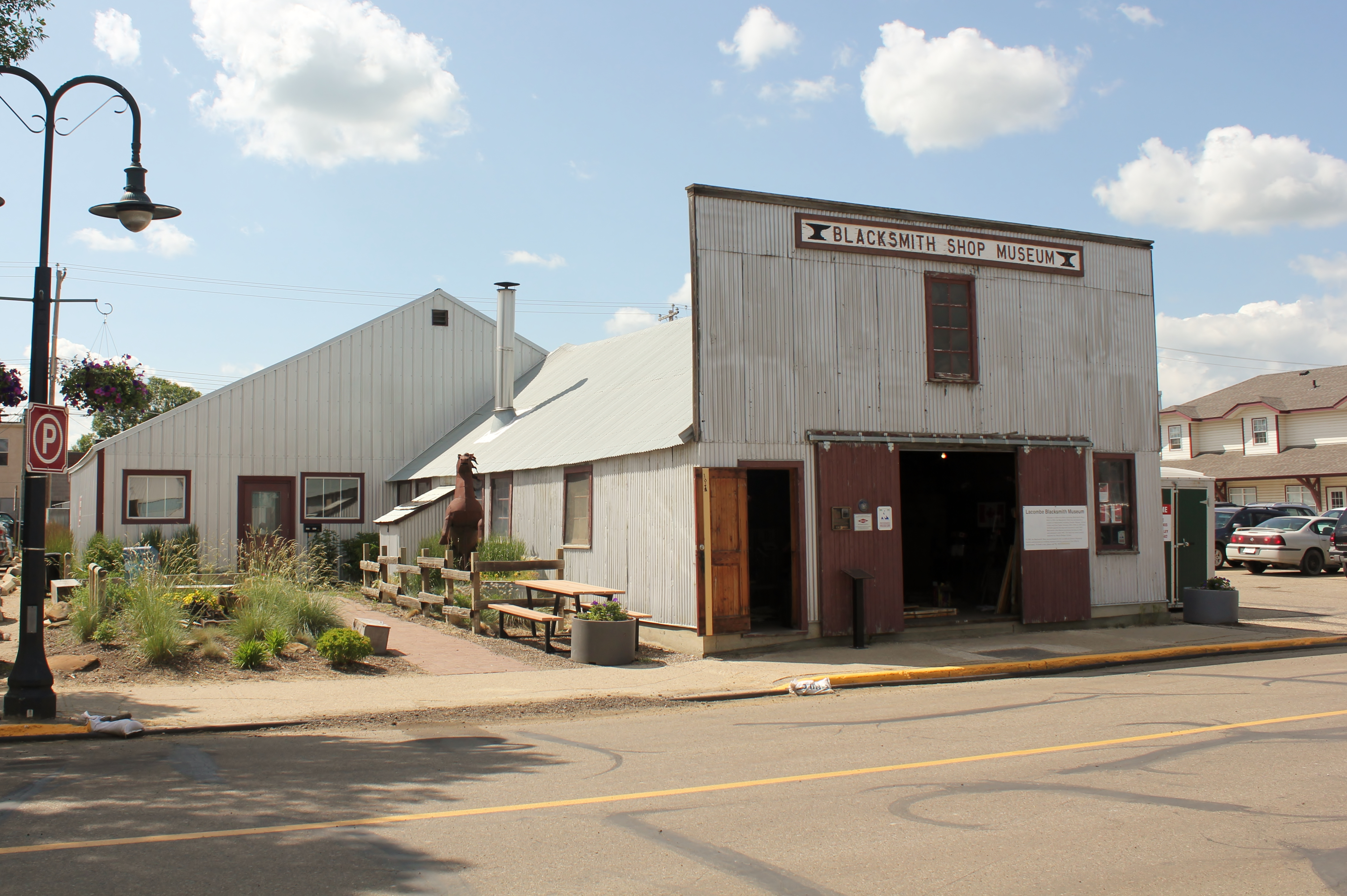

The Lacombe Blacksmith Shop Museum is a museum located in Lacombe, Alberta that is owned and operated by the Lacombe and District Historical Society (daily operations are managed by the public-facing arm of the Lacombe and District Historical Society, the Lacombe Museum). The blacksmith shop has been in continual use since 1902. Of the many blacksmith shops that would have been operating in Lacombe throughout the 20th century, the Lacombe Blacksmith Shop Museum is the only blacksmith shop remaining in the City of Lacombe.

The Lacombe Blacksmith Shop Museum may also be referred to as the Glass Street Shop, or Selvais Welding.

== History ==
The Lacombe Blacksmith Shop Museum was opened in 1902 by blacksmith A. F. Weddle. The shop was ideally located mere metres from the downtown core and built facing Railway Street (Highway 2A). In the early 1900s, 49 Street (historically known as Glass Street) would have also been home to at least one other blacksmith shop, a livery stable, and a coal seller.

Weddle operated the shop for a short period before selling the business to Alfred and Stanley Watson in 1903.

The Watson Brothers operate the blacksmith shop for four years before selling to blacksmith John McNab. McNab independently operates the shop for nineteen years before forming a partnership with John Reeves in 1926. One year later Reeves purchases the shop and operates the business until 1939.

In 1939 the Selvais family moves to Lacombe. Belgian-born blacksmith, Jules Selvais, rents the space before purchasing it from Reeves. The Selvais' become the longest-running owners of the shop, having owned it for 53 years.

In 1993, the Lacombe and District Historical Society, at the time the Maskipitoon Historical Society, purchases the shop from the Selvais family with the intent of turning the shop into a blacksmithing museum. One year later the historical society opens the shop to the public as the Lacombe Blacksmith Shop Museum.

== Structure ==
The 1902 building is a rectangular structure with a faux facade facing 49 Street. Much of the structure is original and features the walls and floors from the 1902 building. The structure is a wooden frame covered in a corrugated metal envelope.

Today, one coal forge is located on the south wall of the building. Historically, multiple forges could have been installed along the south wall, evidenced by the remaining holes for chimneys. The north wall of the shop is free from forges as this traditionally would have been where horses were shoed.

In 1953 an addition was added to the west of the original blacksmith shop. The addition has served as a welding shop since opening.

Large restoration projects have been undertaken by the Lacombe and District Historical Society multiple times since taking over ownership of the building in 1993. The first took place immediately after obtaining the building in 1993. That project restored the front of the building to its 1902 appearance by installing sliding doors. Extensive repairs were undertaken on the foundation, the walls, and the building envelope. The shop was emptied of its contents so that the floor could be dug up and the pilings repaired or replaced.

In 2019 all wood on the exterior of the building was restored. The original paned windows were restored and repaired as needed and new storm windows were made to match the paned windows.

In 2021 restoration work was undertaken on the envelope of the building with the roof and siding being restored or repaired as needed.

Over 2021-2022 repairs were conducted in the interior of the shop to the motor and drive shaft that power the two trip hammers located in the workspace.

== Museum ==
The Lacombe Blacksmith Shop has operated as a museum showcasing the trade of blacksmithing since 1994. The museum is open to the public Victoria Day - Labour Day long weekend each year. During this period visitors can interact with interpreters that provide live blacksmithing demonstrations using the coal forge that is housed inside of the shop. The interior of the shop features a work area on a sand floor with a forge, two trip hammers, drill press, and hand tools that the blacksmiths use in demonstrations.

The building features a wide range of tools and items related to early 20th-century blacksmithing on display.

Throughout the summer season, the Lacombe Museum offers blacksmithing workshops that allow members of the public to learn blacksmithing skills in one of the oldest blacksmith shops in the province.

=== Virtual Exhibit and Tour ===
The Lacombe Museum features a virtual exhibit on its website that outlines the history of the Lacombe Blacksmith Shop Museum and provides a virtual tour of the building.

== Designations ==
The following designations apply only to the 1902 structure, and not to the 1953 addition.

On May 16, 2011 the Lacombe Blacksmith Shop was designated as a Provincial Historic Resource by the Province of Alberta.

On September 26, 2015 the Lacombe Blacksmith Shop was officially designated as a Municipal Heritage Resource by the City of Lacombe.

Along with the Michener House Museum, the Lacombe Blacksmith Shop Museum is an Alberta Museums Association Recognized Museum.
