= Flatiron Building (Lacombe, Alberta) =

Building in Canada

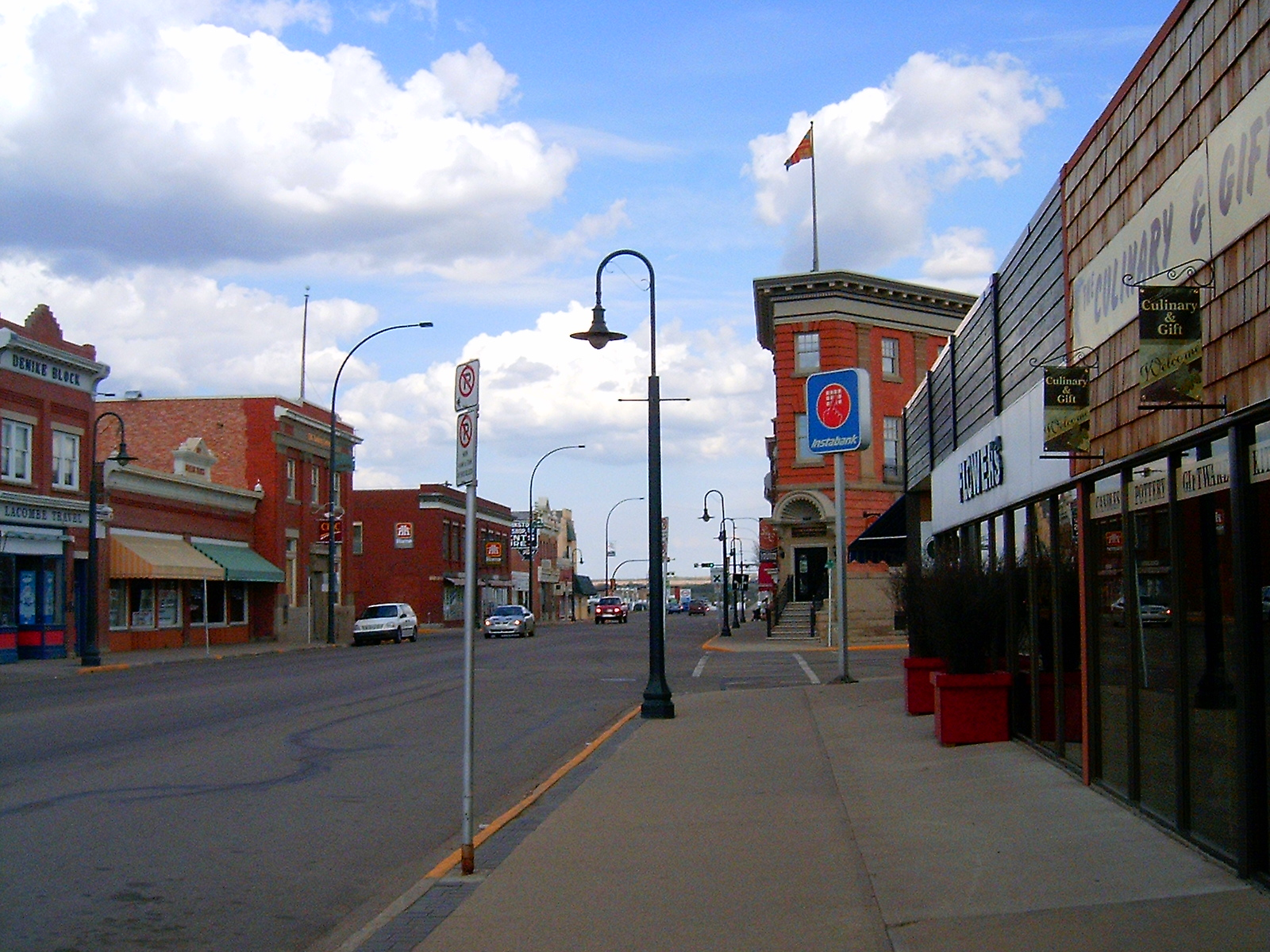
- Flatiron Building looking out onto 50 Ave, in 2005

- Location within Alberta
- 52.46298°N 113.73083°W
- Location: 50 Ave. & 49c Ave., Lacombe, Alberta

History
- Built: 1904

Site notes
- Architect(s): Morley Hogle and Huntley Ward Davis

The Flatiron Building in Lacombe, Alberta is the oldest flatiron building in the province. It was designed by architects Morley Hogle and Huntley Ward Davis in 1903 and opened for business in 1904. The building served as the Merchants Bank of Canada for many years. For over a century, the famous 'Lacombe flatiron block' was home to many businesses, law offices, and unique shops. Almost one hundred years after the building was erected, it was privately bought and restored as part of the Alberta Main Street Project. Today, this architectural landmark is home to Lacombe Regional Tourism. They offer visitor information, have a local gift shop, and host some information on Lacombe's history.

== History of Merchant's Bank and Building ==
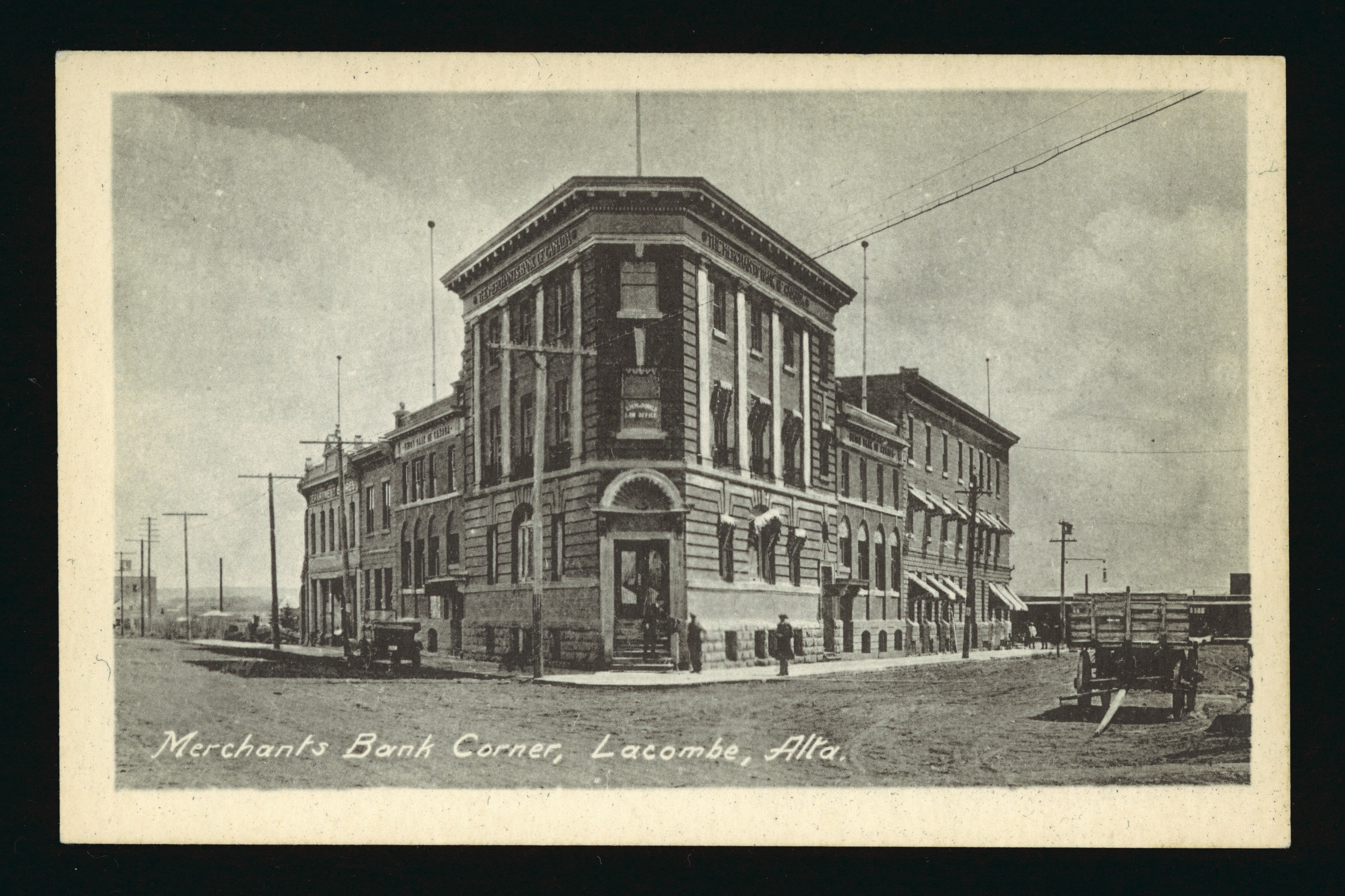
A view of the Merchants Bank of Canada from the front between 1910 and 1920.

The Merchants Bank of Canada was the first bank in Lacombe. Formed in 1901, the bank initially rented out a room in a local school. Unfortunately, when bank workers arrived to their temporary location, they found it hadn't been fully constructed. In consequence, the bank then rented a room in the local Victoria hotel, where the bank operated shortly for over a week. There is little documentation as to where the bank was located in between the time of the hotel and the opening of its permanent home in the flatiron building.

According to "the Merchant Bank (Flat Iron Building) was certainly Lacombe's most sophisticated and commanding structure. Designed in the Beaux Arts tradition of classically-inspired architecture, it cost $30,000 to build in 1904. The design, however, set this structure apart; specific classical features includes the giant order pilasters or simulated columns which run through the second and third stories, a cornice along the top of the structure and scallop-shaped hood over the main entrance. The three-storey "flatiron" building is unique in the Town of Lacombe and the oldest of three such structures built in western Canada."

Fortunately it was built to be fireproof; in 1906 all other buildings on its block were destroyed by a fire.

In 1922, the Merchants Bank of Canada was absorbed by the Bank of Montreal. The Lacombe branch of the Merchants Bank became home to the Bank of Montreal's local branch until 1967.

It was designated a Provincial historic site of Alberta in 1990.

In 2001, the building was privately bought and extensively renovated. The renovations were completed in 2003. The flatiron building now serves not only as a museum, but also as a private residence and corporate offices.

== The Flatiron Building and the Lacombe Museums ==
The Lacombe and District Historical Society, as the Lacombe Museum, operates on the first three floors of the building. The Lacombe Museum displays temporary and travelling exhibits on the main floor. A gift shop can also be found on this floor. The second floor is home to office space for Lacombe Museum employees.

=== Plans ===
In 2022 the Lacombe Museums hoped to move its collections and archives to the basement of the Flatiron Building. This move, and the construction of a reading room in the Flatiron Building, was intended to give the public better access to the museum's archival materials and reference library.
