= Oberstufenrealgymnasium (Austria) =

Type of Austrian school

Oberstufenrealgymnasium or Upper-Level Realgymnasium (ORG) is a special type of Austrian Gymnasium (secondary school). It is offered only at the upper level; admission is possible either from the lower level of a Gymnasium or from the 4th grade of Hauptschule (8th school level). The federal upper-level Realgymnasium as a federal school is designated BORG.

BORG is an abbreviation of Bundes Oberstufen Real Gymnasium, which is similar to High School in the United States or in Britain - Grammar School.

== History ==
The school type was introduced in 1962 under the name Musically-pedagogical Realgymnasium (MPRG). The purpose of the school was to succeed the teacher training institutes, especially as preparation for attending the Pedagogical Academy as a training institution for teachers in the compulsory school sector (primary school teachers and lower level) and for social professions.

== See also ==
- Education in Austria
