= St. Peter am Hart =

- Municipality
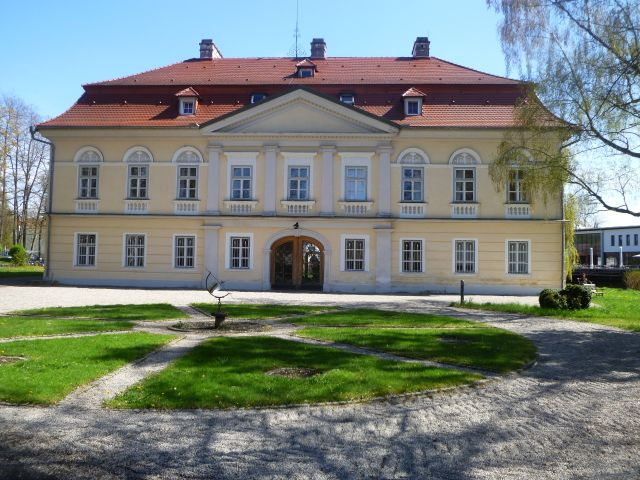
- Bogenhofen palace

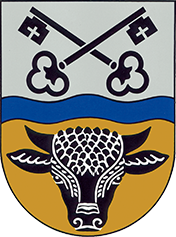
- Coat of arms

- Location within Austria
- Coordinates: 48°15′15″N 13°05′40″E
- Country: Austria
- State: Upper Austria
- District: Braunau

Government
  - Mayor: Robert Wimmer (ÖVP)

Area
  - Total: 22.91 km^{2} (8.85 sq mi)
- Elevation: 372 m (1,220 ft)

Population (2018-01-01)
  - Total: 2,447
  - Density: 106.8/km^{2} (276.6/sq mi)
- Time zone: UTC+1 (CET)
  - Summer (DST): UTC+2 (CEST)
- Postal code: 4963
- Area code: +43 7722
- Vehicle registration: BR
- Website: www.st-peter-hart.ooe.gv.at

St. Peter am Hart is a municipality in the district of Braunau in the Austrian state of Upper Austria.

== Geography ==
St. Peter lies in the region of Innviertel. About 15% of the municipality is forest and the other 63% of it is farmland.

== Localities ==
- Aching (80)
- Aham (55)
- Aselkam (174)
- Bergham (145)
- Bogenhofen (322)
- Dietfurt (219)
- Guggenberg (9)
- Hagenau (192)
- Hart (18)
- Heitzenberg (25)
- Hundslau (5)
- Jahrsdorf (183)
- Meinharting (8)
- Moos (136)
- Nöfing (106)
- Ofen (87)
- Reikersdorf (270)
- Schickenedt (14)
- Spraid (14)
- St. Peter am Hart (351)
- Wimm (9)

== See also ==
- Oberösterreich
