= Danish Landrace pig =

Danish breed of pig

Danish Landrace
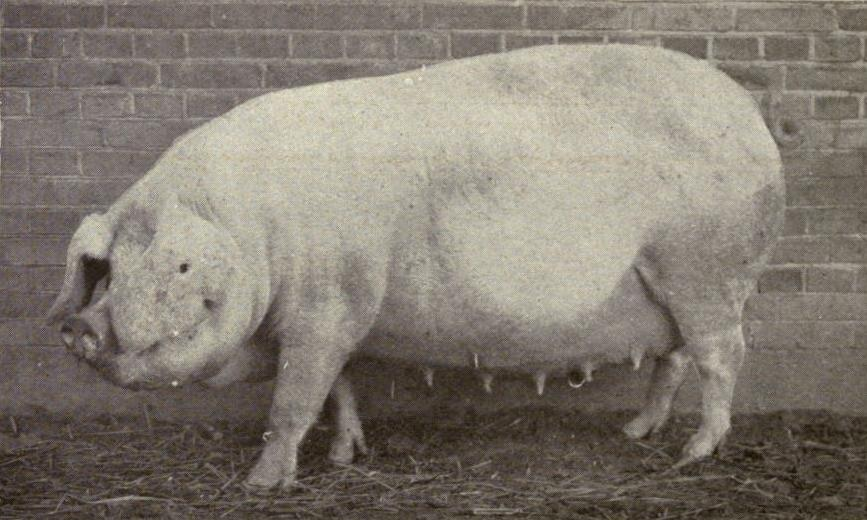

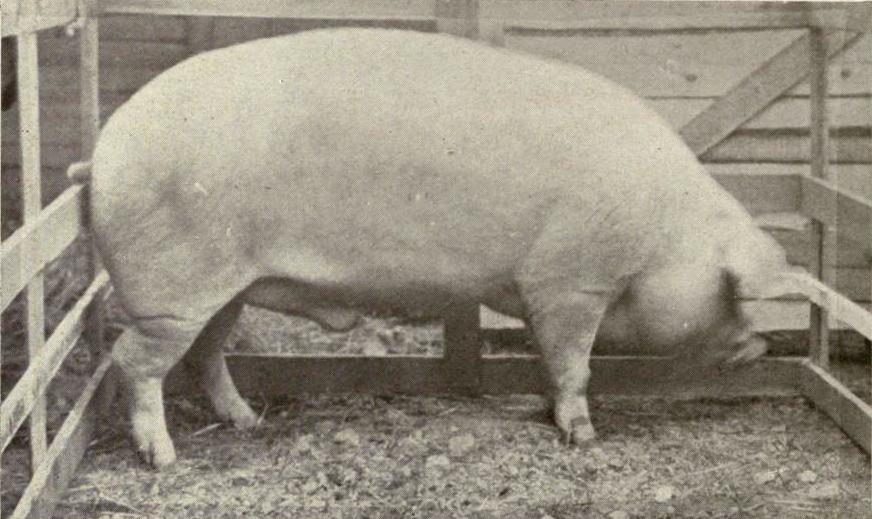
- Sow (above) and boar (below), photographs from 1909
- Conservation status: FAO (2007): not at risk; DAD-IS (2022): unknown/at risk
- Other names: Dansk Landrace
- Country of origin: Denmark

Traits
- Weight: Male: 325 kg; Female: 225 kg
- Height: 90 cm

The Danish Landrace, Danish: Dansk Landrace, is a Danish breed of domestic pig. It is of medium to large size, white in colour with a long body, fine hair, a long snout and heavy drooping ears.

== History ==
During the second half of the nineteenth century, Denmark became a major supplier of bacon to the United Kingdom: exports grew from 1000 tons per year in 1850 to 50000 in 1900; they grew still further in the twentieth century, reaching 384000 in 1932. From about 1865, and particularly between 1879 and 1896, breeding stock of the British Large White or Yorkshire breed was imported and cross-bred with local animals to supply the bacon trade. The cross of a Large White boar with a sow of the traditional Jutland breed was found to be particularly successful.

In 1896 the Danish government drew up a national plan for pig production, under which the Large White x Jutland hybrid would become a new breed, the Danish Landrace. A herd-book published in 1906 listed 126 boars born from 1893 to 1904; some 60% of them were from Jutland, 21% from Fyn and 10% from Zealand. Performance testing was started in 1899. Herds of purebred local and Large White pigs were separately reared; farmers could buy stock to produce the first-generation hybrid, which soon became the predominant pig of Denmark. From about 1925 the use of Large White boars was reduced, and the new breed selectively bred for characteristics including more length in the body and less fat on the back.

After the end of the Second World War, limits were placed on exports of breeding stock; the Danish Landrace had already been exported to many countries of the world, and had given rise to numerous regional breeds, among them the American, Dutch Landrace, Norwegian, South African and Swedish Landrace.

In the 1960s it was essentially the only pig breed in the country, but in the 1970s it came to be considered insufficiently productive for intensive farming. A comparison with imported Large White in 1977 found it to grow more slowly while consuming more feed. From about this time it was cross-bred with newly-imported Large White boars to create the Dan-Hybrid sow line, on which a variety of Duroc, Hampshire and Large White boars were used. By 1983 approximately 3500 of the original breed remained.

== Characteristics ==
The Danish Landrace is a medium-to-large, long, lean pig. It is white, and is scantily clad with short hairs. The snout is long, and the large ears droop forwards. It has deep flanks and lacks the wrinkles and excess fat found in some other breeds.
