= Christian Record Services for the Blind =

US-based non-profit organization

- Abbreviation: CRSB
- Formation: 1899
- Founder: Austin Orlando Wilson
- Website: christianrecord.org

Christian Record Services for the Blind (Christian Record Services, Inc., CRSB) is a non-profit organization that serves people who are legally blind and visually impaired. "Christian Record Services for the Blind is an international organization serving blind and visually impaired individuals in approximately 70 countries worldwide and employs about 15 people." It is a ministry of the Seventh-day Adventist Church but services blind people regardless of beliefs.

== History ==
Christian Record Services for the Blind (Christian Record Services, Inc., CRSB) was founded in 1899 by Austin Orlando Wilson. Wilson, who was blinded by an accident earlier in life, was disappointed that there was not more material available for the blind and undertook making material of his own. The first 75 issues of the Christian Record were produced using a washing machine hand wringer for a printing press.

In 1900, a yearly subscription to Christian Record cost $1.50. This fee was eliminated in 1912 and Christian Record, along with a host of other publications, is now provided free of charge.

December 30, 1902, the Christian Record headquarters in Battle Creek, Michigan, was burned to the ground. There were no casualties; however, an estimated $300,000 in damages were incurred by the organization and the section housing its equipment and supplies.

Christian Record Services for the Blind moved to a temporary location provided by one of its sister institutions, Union College (Nebraska) in 1904. Christian Record had several temporary locations from 1904 to 1912. May 28, 1912, the organization purchased a building across the street from Union College (Nebraska) for $2,700. This would be Christian Record's headquarters until 1936 when they would move their headquarters to South 48th and Bancroft streets in Lincoln.

In 1933–34, CRSB had an exhibit at the World's Fair in Chicago, Illinois.

June 24–28, 1963, Christian Record's workers moved into their spacious new headquarters at 52nd and Linden streets. The new headquarters boasted 27,800 in square footage and cost an estimated $387,000. At the open house on October 7, then Nebraska state governor Frank B. Morrison gave the opening remarks. Also in attendance were Robert S. Bray, Chief of the Division for the Blind, Library of Congress, and former Nebraska Senator, Carl T. Curtis.

In 1967, CRSB opened the first-ever summer camp for the blind at Kulaqua in High Springs, Florida, at Kulaqua Retreat and Conference Center with 23 youth. Over 48,000 individuals have attended CRSB's blind camps across North America since their inception.

March 26, 1969, former first lady Patricia Nixon accepted an invitation by former Nebraska senator Carl T. Curtis to join Christian Record's advisory board.

In 1970, Christian Record started putting its books onto audio cassette tapes.

September 2010, Christian Record was awarded the Lincoln Nebraska Integrity Award by the Better Business Bureau.

July 2011, the organization started releasing its audiobooks on cartridges specially designed by the National Library Service for the Blind and Visually Impaired.

In 2013, Christian Record hosted the first-annual EYE RUN, an eye health awareness event and fundraiser. In subsequent years, the EYE RUN expanded from a 5K run walk/run to add a one miler walk/run and a 10K run. Proceeds from the EYE RUN provide services and programs to clients of the organization. The event is held annually at Holmes Lake Park in Lincoln, Nebraska.

Beginning in 2014, audio cassettes were discontinued in favor of the new digital cartridges.

In 2016, the organization moved from its location in College View to suites at the Trade Center.

Beginning in 2017, Christian Record expanded its digital library holdings, giving clients better access to online and mobile reading materials.

== Lending library ==
Christian Record Services lending library contains more than 1,500 volumes in braille and digital cartridges, free of charge for the blind and visually impaired.

== Magazine subscriptions ==
Christian Record Services offers free large-print and braille inspirational magazines. Among magazines offered are: Light (bi-monthly large-print magazine for adults, circulation 12,228), The Children's Friend (quarterly braille magazine for children 9–12, circulation 1,116), The Student (weekly Bible lessons, circulation unknown), Amazing Facts Bible Correspondence Course (circulation unknown), and Christian Record.

== Full-vision books ==
Full-vision books are books that both sighted children and blind parents can read or vice versa. Transparent plastic sheets with braille dots printed on them accompany the large-print text. Sighted parents can teach their children to read, or sighted children can read the print while mom or dad reads the braille portion of the page.
