= John Rogers Pitman =

John Rogers Pitman (1782–1861) was an English clergyman and author.

== Life ==
He studied at Christ's Hospital, and then Pembroke College, Cambridge. He was admitted B.A. in 1804, and proceeded M.A. in 1815. Taking holy orders, he was appointed perpetual curate of Berden and vicar of Ugley, Essex, 18 February 1817.

He became well known as a preacher in London, at Berkeley and Belgrave Chapels, and at the Foundling and Magdalene Hospitals before 1830. In 1833 he was presented to the perpetual curacy of St Barnabas, Kensington, by the vicar, Joseph Holden Pott. He resigned his Essex livings in 1846, and Kensington in 1848, becoming domestic chaplain to the Duchess of Kent. He died at Bath on 27 August 1861, a few months after his royal patroness.

== Works ==
Pitman was a prolific writer, compiler, and editor, producing annotated editions of:

- the works of Jeremy Taylor (1820–2); also
- John Lightfoot (1822–5);
- Edward Reynolds (1826);
- Nathaniel Hooke's Roman History (1821);
- Simon Patrick's and William Lowth's Biblical commentaries in A Critical Commentary and Paraphrase (1822) (with works of Richard Arnald, Daniel Whitby and Moses Lowman); and of
- Joseph Bingham's Origines Ecclesiasticæ (1840).

Besides sermons, he also published:

- Excerpta ex variis Romanis poetis, London, 1808.
- Practical Lectures upon the Ten First Chapters of the Gospel of St. John, London, 1821; with a supplement, 1822.
- The School Shakespeare, with notes, London, 1822.
- Sophoclis Ajax, Greek and Latin, with notes, London.
- Practical Commentary on our Lord's Sermon on the Mount, London, 1852.

== Notes ==
Attribution

This article incorporates text from a publication now in the public domain: "Pitman, John Rogers". Dictionary of National Biography. London: Smith, Elder & Co. 1885–1900.
