= Day-year principle =

Method of interpretation of Bible prophecy

The day-year principle or year-for-a-day principle is a method of interpretation of Bible prophecy in which the word day in prophecy is considered to be symbolic of a year of actual time. It was the method used by most of the Reformers, and is used principally by the historicist school of prophetic interpretation. It is actively taught by the Seventh-day Adventist Church, Jehovah's Witnesses, and the Christadelphians, though the understanding is not unique to these Christian denominations; since for example, it is implied in the Prophecy of Seventy Weeks. The day-year principle is also used by the Baháʼí Faith, as well by most astrologers who employ the "Secondary Progression" theory, aka the day-for-a-year theory, wherein the planets are moved forwards in the table of planetary motion (known as an ephemeris) a day for each year of life or fraction thereof. The astrologers say that the four seasons of the year are directly spiritually, phenomenologically like the four "seasons" of the day.

== Biblical basis ==
Proponents of the principle, such as the Seventh-day Adventists, claim that it has three primary precedents in Scripture:

1. Numbers 14:34. The Israelites will wander for 40 years in the wilderness, one year for every day spent by the spies in Canaan.
2. Ezekiel 4:5–6. The prophet Ezekiel is commanded to lie on his left side for 390 days, followed by his right side for 40 days, to symbolize the equivalent number of years of punishment on Israel and Judah respectively.
3. Daniel 9:24–27. This is known as the Prophecy of Seventy Weeks. The majority of scholars understand the passage to refer to 70 "sevens" or "septets" of years—that is, a total of 490 years.

While not listed as primary precedent by the proponents, some supporters cite a direct reference to the day-for-a-year concept is made in Genesis.

1. Genesis 29:27. Laban requires an additional seven years of work in contract for Rachel's hand in marriage, calling it a week.

Jon Paulien has defended the principle from a systematic theology perspective, not strictly from the Bible.

== History ==
The day-year principle was partially employed by Jews as seen in Daniel 9:24–27, Ezekiel 4:4-7 and in the early church. It was first used in Christian exposition in 380 AD by Ticonius, who interpreted the three and a half days of Revelation 11:9 as three and a half years, writing 'three days and a half; that is, three years and six months' ('dies tres et dimidium; id est annos tres et menses sex'). In the 5th century Faustus of Riez gave the same interpretation of Revelation 11:9, writing 'three and a half days which correspond to three years and six months' ('Tres et dimidius dies tribus annis et sex mensibus respondent), and in c. 550 Primasius also gave the same interpretation, writing 'it is possible to understand the three days and a half as three years and six months' ('Tres dies et dimidium possumus intelligere tres annos et sex menses'). The same interpretation of Revelation 11:9 was given by later expositors like Anspert, Haymo, and Berengaudus (all of the ninth century). Primasius appears to have been the first to appeal directly to previous Biblical passages in order to substantiate the principle, referring to Numbers 14:34 in support of his interpretation of the three and a half days of Revelation 11:9. Haymo and Bruno Astensis "justify it by the parallel case of Ezekiel lying on his side 390 days, to signify 390 years; — i. e. a day for a year. — ". Protestant Reformers were well established on the day/year principle and it was also accepted by many Christian groups, ministers, and theologians.

Others who expounded the Historicist interpretation are John Wycliffe, John Knox, William Tyndale, Martin Luther, John Calvin, Ulrich Zwingli, Philip Melanchthon, Isaac Newton, Jan Hus, John Foxe, John Wesley, Jonathan Edwards, George Whitefield, Charles Finney, C. H. Spurgeon, Matthew Henry, Adam Clarke, Albert Barnes, and Bishop Thomas Newton.

== Christian historicist application ==
=== 70 weeks or 490-year prophecy ===
Daniel 9 contains the Prophecy of Seventy Weeks. Biblical scholars have interpreted the 70 weeks vision in the historical methodology for nearly two millennia as illustrated in the following table.

List of Historicist Biblical Expositors who commented on the 70 weeks
from the 3rd to 19th centuries

List of Biblical Expositors of the Early Church Period: 100-457 AD
Name	Date	70 Weeks	Last Week	Cross
Tertullian	c. 240	From Persia	To Christ	70th week
Clement of Alexandria	c. 220	To Advent		During
Hippolytus	d. 236	490 yrs	Separated	
Sextus Julius Africanus	c. 240	490 yrs	To Christ	
Eusebius Pamphili	c. 340	490 yrs	To Christ	Midst
Athanasius	373	To Cross		
Cyril of Jerusalem	386	Wks. of Yrs.		
Polychronis	430	490 yrs	7 yrs	midst
Jerome	420	490 yrs		
Theodoret	457	490 yrs		
Biblical Expositors of the Early Medieval Period: 400-1200 AD
Name	Date	70 Weeks	Last Week	Cross
Augustine	d. 430	to Cross		
Sargis d'Aberga	7th century	69 wks to Christ		
Venerable Bede	d. 735	457 solar yrs	Bap. midst	at end
Saadia	d. 942	490 yrs from exile		
Jehoram	10th century	Years		
Yefet ben Ali	10th century	Sabbatical Yrs to Titus		
Rashi	d. 1105	490 yrs		
Abraham bar Hiyya	d. 1136	Wks of Sabbatical yrs.		
Abraham ibn Ezra	d. 1167	490 yrs		
Thomas Aquinas	d. 1274	475 Solar yrs		At End
Arnold of Villanova	1292	Yrs to Christ	Fall of Jerusalem	
Pierre Jen d'Olivi	d. 1298	Wks. of Yrs.		
Biblical Expositors of the Reformation Era: 1522-1614 AD
Name	Date	70 Weeks	Last Week	Cross
Martin Luther	1522	Yrs. (2d Darius)	34-41 AD	Begin
Philipp Melanchthon	1543	Yrs. (2dn Artax.)		Midst
Johann Funck	1558	457 BC - 34 AD	to 34	End
Nikolaus Selnecker	1579	Yrs. (2d Artax)		
Georg Nigrinus	1570	456 BC - 34 AD		End
Johann Oecolampadius	1530	Years	Long Period	
Heinrich Bullinger	1557	457 BC to 34 AD	to 34 AD	End
George Joye	1545	Cyrus, yrs		
John Napier	1593	490 yrs		
Biblical Expositors of the Post-Reformation Era—Europe: 1600-1800 AD
Name	Date	70 Weeks	Last Week	Cross
Joseph Mede	1631	417 BC - 74 AD		(33) AD
Henry More	1664	490 yrs		
John Tillinghast	1655	Ends 34 AD		34 AD
William Sherwin	1670	490 yrs		
Thomas Beverly	1684	Yrs to Christ		
Johannes Cocceius	1701	490 yrs.		(33) AD
Robert Fleming Jr.	1701	490 yrs.		
Sir Isaac Newton	1727	457 BC - 34 AD		34 AD
William Lowth	1700	Years		
William Whiston	1706	445 BC - 32+ AD		33 AD
Heinrich Horch	1712	490 yrs		Midst
Berienberg Bible	1743	Yrs. to Christ		Midst
Johann Al Bengal	1740	Yrs to Christ		Midst
Johann Ph. Petri	1768	453 BC to 37 AD		Midst
Hans Wood	1787	420 BC - 70 AD		
Christian G. Thube	1789	37 AD		30 AD
Biblical Expositors of the Post-Reformation Era—America: 1600-1800 AD
Name	Date	70 Weeks	Last Week	Cross
Eph. Huit	1644	490 yrs		
Thomas Parker	1646	490 yrs		
John Davenport	1653	Yrs to Christ		
William Burnet	1724	490 yrs		
Joshua Bellamy	1758	490 yrs		
Aaron Burr	1757	490 yrs		
Samuel Langdon	1774	490 yrs		
Samuel Gatchet	1781	490 yrs		
Samuel Osgood	1794	490 (Art.)		
Biblical expositors of the 19th-century Advent Awakening: 1800-1845 AD
Name	Date	70 Weeks	Last Week	Cross
William Hales	1803		27/31/34 AD	
George Stanley Faber	1804	458 BC -		
Thomas Scott	1805	7th yr of Artax.		
Adam Clarke	1810	7th yr of Artax.		
W. C. Davis	1818	453 BC - 37 AD		
Arch. Mason	1820	457 BC - 33 AD		
Jno A. Brown	1823	457 BC - 34 AD		
Jno. Bayford	1820	Years		
Lewis Way	1818	Years		
Henry Drummond	1830	To 1st Advent		
John Fry	1822	457 BC - 33 AD		
Thomas White	1828	457 BC - 33 AD		
Edward Cooper	1825	457 BC - 33 AD		
Thomas Keyworth	1828	457 BC - 33 AD		
Alfred Addis	1829	457 BC - 33 AD		
Jno. Hooper	1829	490 yrs		
William W. Pym	1829	453 BC - 37 AD		
Edward N. Hoare	1830	457 BC - 33 AD		
William Digby	1831	457 Bc - 33 AD		
Bp Dave Wilson	1836	453 BC - 37 AD		
Alex Keith	1828	7th of Artax		Cross
John Cog	1832	Years		
Matt Habershon	1834	457 BC - 33 AD		
Ed Bickersteih	1836	457 BC - 34 AD		
Louis Gaussen	1837	457 BC - 34 AD		

The vision of the 70 weeks is interpreted as dealing with the Jewish nation from about the middle of the 5th century BCE until not long after the death of Jesus in the 1st century CE and so is not concerned with current or future history. Historicists consider Antiochus Epiphanes irrelevant to the fulfillment of the prophecy.

Historicist interpretation of the Prophecy of Seventy Weeks was that it foretells with great specificity information about Jesus as the Messiah, not some lowlevel official or antichrist figure. Daniel 9:25 states that the 'seventy weeks' (generally interpreted as 490 years according to the day-year principle) is to begin "from the time the word goes out to restore and rebuild Jerusalem," which is when the Persian king Artaxerxes I, gave the decree to rebuild Jerusalem to Ezra, so the 490 years point to the time of Christ's anointing.

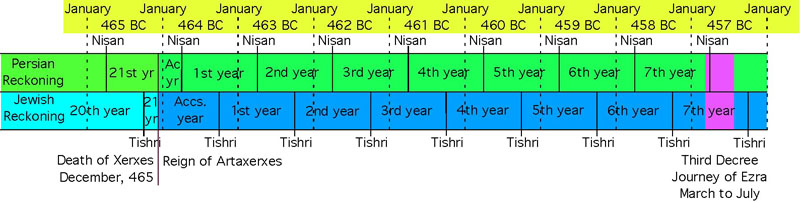
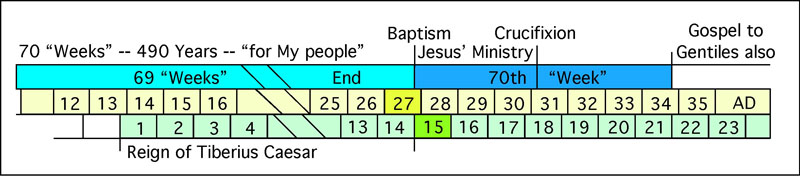
How Seventh-day Adventists see the beginning (top) and ending (bottom) of the seventy weeks timeline.

In the 21st century this interpretation (emphasized by the 19th-century Millerite movement) is still held by Seventh-day Adventists and other groups.

==== Seventh-day Adventists ====
The Seventh-day Adventist interpretation of Daniel chapter 9 presents the 490 years as an uninterrupted period. Like others before them they equate the beginning of the 70 weeks "from the time the word goes out to rebuild and restore Jerusalem," of Daniel 9:25 with the decree by Artaxerxes I in 458/7 BC which provided money for rebuilding the temple and Jerusalem and allowed for restoration of a Jewish administration. It ends 3½ years after the crucifixion. The appearance of "Messiah the Prince" at the end of the 69 weeks (483 years) is aligned with Jesus' baptism in 27 CE, in the fifteenth year of Tiberius Caesar. The 'cutting off' of the "anointed one" refers to the crucifixion 3½ years after the end of the 483 years, bringing "atonement for iniquity" and "everlasting righteousness". Jesus is said to 'confirm' the "covenant" between God and mankind by his death on the cross in the Spring (about Easter time) of 31 CE "in the midst of" the last seven years. At the moment of his death the 4 inch (10 cm) thick curtain between the Holy and Most Holy Places in the Temple ripped from top to bottom, marking the end of the Temple's sacrificial system. The last week ends 3½ years after the crucifixion (i.e., in 34 AD) when the gospel was redirected from only the Jews to all peoples.

Some of the representative voices among exegetes of the last 150 years are E. W. Hengstenberg, J. N. Andrews, E. B. Pusey, J. Raska, J. Hontheim, Boutflower, Uriah Smith, O. Gerhardt. and Ellis Skolfield.

Illustrations explaining the beginning and ending dates of the 70 weeks
according to Historicist interpretation

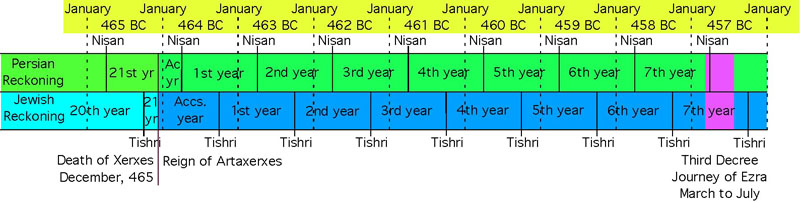
Beginning of the 70 Weeks: King's reigns were counted from New Year to New Year following an 'Accession Year'. The Persian New Year began in Nisan (March–April). The Jewish civil New Year began in Tishri (September–October)

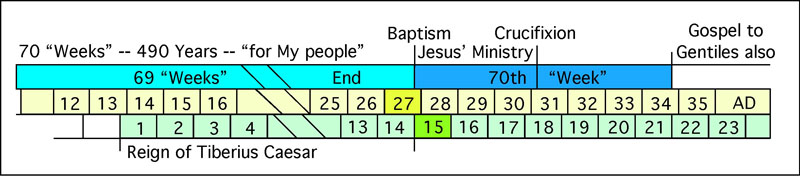
Ending of the 70 Weeks: Tiberius Caesar began ruling in the Fall of 13 AD. So, his 15th year began in the Fall of 27, the year of the baptism of Jesus. This is 69 weeks (i.e. 483 years) after 457 BC.

To understand 70-week prophecy of Daniel 9:24-27, one has to use the key. The Prophecy of Seventy Weeks becomes clear, as pointing to the messiah using the prophetic day-year principle. Using this, the 69 weeks, or the 483 years of Daniel 9, culminates in A.D. 27. Now "unto Messiah the Prince" makes sense and indicates the time for the coming of the "anointed one" or Messiah, with the final week during His ministry. It is not the time of the Messiah's birth but when He would appear as the Messiah, and this is right when Christ took up His ministry after being baptized. Thus the prophetic day-year principle correctly points to the anointed as the Messiah in A.D. 27 or the fifteenth year of Tiberius, not in the future or modern time. While there are other possible ways of reckoning, the beginning point of 457 B.C. as the starting point of the 70-week prophecy as the Messianic prophecies points to Jesus as the Messiah.

The seven and sixty-two-week periods are most frequently understood as consecutive, non-overlapping chronological periods that are more or less exact in terminating with the time at which Christ is anointed with the Holy Spirit at his baptism, with the terminus a quo of this 483-year period being the time associated with the decree given to Ezra by Artaxerxes I in 458/7 BCE. The reference to an anointed one being "cut off" in verse 26a is identified with the death of Christ and has traditionally been thought to mark the midpoint of the seventieth week, which is also when Jeremiah's new "covenant" is "confirmed" (verse 27a) and atonement for "iniquity" (verse 24) is made.

=== 1260 year prophecy ===
Historicist interpreters have usually understood the "time, times and half a time" (i.e. 1+2+0.5=3.5), "1,260 days" and "42 months" mentioned in Daniel and Revelation to be references to represent a period of 1260 years (based on the 360 day Jewish year multiplied by 3.5).

These time periods occur seven times in scripture:

- Daniel 7:25, "time, times and a half".
- Daniel 12:7, "time, times and a half".
- Revelation 11:2, "42 months".
- Revelation 11:3, "1260 days".
- Revelation 12:6, "1260 days".
- Revelation 12:14, "time, times and a half".
- Revelation 13:5, "42 months".

Historicists usually believe the "1,260 days" spanned the Middle Ages and concluded within the early modern or modern era. Although many dates have been proposed for the start and finish of the "1,260 days", certain time spans have proven to be more popular than others. The majority of historicists throughout history have identified the "1,260 days" as being fulfilled by one or more of the following time spans and identify the Papal Office as the Antichrist and culmination of the Great Apostasy:

- 538 AD to 1798: Siege of Rome by Napoleon's Roman Republic, when the pope was taken prisoner.
- 606 AD to 1866
- 756 AD to 2016 Donation of Pepin to (presumed) fall of Papacy.
- 774 AD to 2034 Charlemagne overthrows last Lombard King.
- 800 AD to 2060 Charlemagne is crowned Holy Roman Emperor by the pope.

==== Seventh-Day Adventist interpretation ====
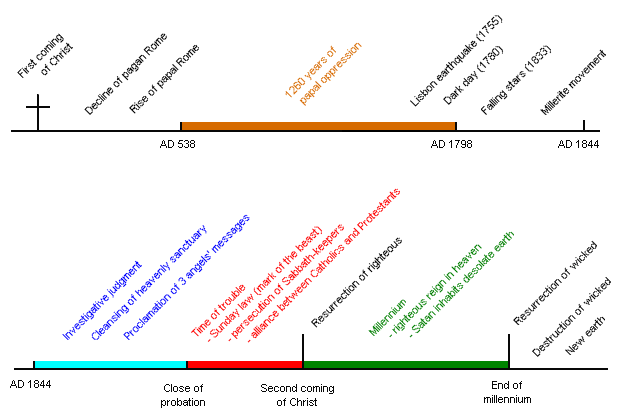
Timeline of "time, times and half a time", 1260 days or 42 month prophecy in historicist Seventh-day Adventism.

The Millerite understanding, like that of earlier Bible students of the Reformation and post-Reformation eras, and also of Seventh-day Adventists which emerged from the Millerites, sees the 1260 days lasting AD 538 to 1798 as the duration of the papacy over Rome. This period began with the defeat of the Ostrogoths by the general Belisarius and ended with the successes of French general Napoleon Bonaparte, specifically, the capture of Pope Pius VI by general Louis Alexandre Berthier in 1798. Seventh-day Adventist use of this principle in Daniel 8:14 is deemed to be of extra-biblical authority (i.e., William Miller/Ellen White-church prophetess) due to the Hebrew word "yowm" not extant in the text of Daniel 8:14. This is the word necessary to meet the Numbers 14:34 and Ezekiel 4:6 day/year principal texts.

==== Other views ====
Robert Fleming writing in 1701 (The Rise and Fall of Rome Papal) stated that the 1260-year period should commence with Pope Paul I becoming a temporal ruler in AD 758 which would expire in 2018 by counting Julian years, or the year 2000 if counting prophetic (360 day) years.

Charles Taze Russel, founder of the Watchtower Society (now known as Jehovah's Witnesses), originally taught that "1874 onward is the time of the Lord's second presence" using the day-year principle to understand the Bible. Later, under the leadership of Joseph Rutherford, Jehovah's Witnesses revised this teaching to state that they "pointed to 1914 as the time for this great event to occur." This is the doctrine still in use today.

Ellis Herbert Skolfield (1927 - 2015) regarded the start of the 1260-year period to be the founding of the Dome of the Rock in 688 AD and the end of the 1260 days as the founding of the nation of Israel, which occurred on May 15, 1948, 1260 years later. Also, forty two months (1278.34 years) from the founding of the Dome of the Rock yields a date of 1967, which is when Jerusalem was freed from Gentile control ("And leave out the Court which is outside of the Temple, and measure it not, for it is given unto the Gentiles and they will tread underfoot the Holy City forty and two months" Revelation 11:2). Skolfield's system of interpretation yields coherent dates, and requires no additional interpolations. For Old Testament references, he uses the 360-day year, and the solar year for New Testament references.

==== 756 to 2016 ====
British Theologian Adam Clarke writing in 1825 stated that the 1260-year period should commence with 755 AD, the actual year Pepin the Short invaded Lombard territory, resulting in the pope's elevation from a subject of the Byzantine Empire to an independent head of state. The Donation of Pepin, which first occurred in 754 and again in 756 gave to the pope temporal power over the Papal States. However, his introductory comments on Daniel 7 added 756 as an alternative commencement date. In April of that year, Pepin, accompanied by Pope Stephen II entered northern Italy from France, forcing the Lombard King Aistulf to lift his siege of Rome, and return to Pavia. Following Aistulf's capitulation, Pepin remained in Italy until finalizing his Donations. Based on this, 19th century commentators anticipate the end of the Papacy in 2016:

As the date of the prevalence and reign of antichrist must, according to the principles here laid down, be fixed at A.D. 756, therefore the end of this period of his reign must be A.D. 756 added to 1260; equal to 2016, the year of the Christian era set by infinite wisdom for this long-prayed-for event. Amen and amen!

Of the five areas of the Bible which mention this timeline, only Revelation 11:9-12 adds a brief 3½ more years to the end of this 1260-year period. If added to 2016, this would bring us to autumn of 2019 or spring of 2020 for the commencement of the Eternal Kingdom. However, far more attention is paid by historicists to 2016 as the final end of the Papacy and the commencement of the Millennial rule than there is to 2019. This may be due in part, to uncertainty as to who or what the two witnesses of the Book of Revelation represent. But for those 17th to 19th century historicists adhering to the day year principle who also predicted a literal restoration of the unconverted Jews in their original homeland, the fall of the Papacy immediately precedes the rapid conversion of the Jews. The two events are closely linked, with the former enabling the latter.

The year 756 AD is also thought to occur 666 years from John's writing of the Book of Revelation. The verse in Daniel 8:25 which reads "...but he shall be broken without hand" is usually understood to mean that the destruction of the "little horn" or Papacy will not be caused by any human action. Volcanic activity is described as the means by which Rome will be overthrown. The following excerpt is from the 5th edition (1808) of the Rev. David Simpson's book "A Plea for Religion and the Sacred Writings":

Antichrist will retain some part of his dominion over the nations till about the year 2016. And when the 1260 years are expired, Rome itself, with all its magnificence, will be absorbed in a lake of fire, sink into the sea, and rise no more at all for ever.

Though the end of the 1260 years will be marked by dramatic events, it will not instantly remove all the governments of the world. The Messianic Kingdom will be established in place of the former Roman Empire, and continue to expand until it has enveloped the remaining countries. The following is an excerpt from "The Covenanter", a Reformed Presbyterian publication (1857):

The end of the 1260 years will not at once usher in the brightness of the Millennial day. It will be marked by some occurrence, by some grand movement of Providence—such as the violent, it may be, and sudden crushing of the Papal power, and that of the corrupt and oppressive monarchies of the Old World, and of the governments similar to them in spirit, if not in form, in the New-— by some event in the pagan world, in which a new era will take its rise: new and signally successful efforts for the conversion of the Jews—for the evangelization of the nations-—for the subjecting of the "kingdoms of this world" to the law and government of "the Lord and of his Christ." A generation may pass, or more than one, before this work will be fully completed; but it will advance with large strides.

While Daniel 2:35 makes reference to the various world powers (represented as various metals) being "broken to pieces together", the previous verse (v.34) portrays the Eternal Kingdom coming as "a stone cut from a mountain without hands" and striking a statue (symbolizing the successive world empires) on its feet first. Most adherents of the day-year principle, interpret these feet "that were of iron and clay," as denoting the nations descended from and occupying areas of the former Roman Empire. The dominions of all the empires and nations are expected to be crushed simultaneously, but the end of "life" or existence of the Roman derived countries will precede that of the other nations of the world.

The length of time for this worldwide expansion to complete is indicated in Daniel 7:12, which adds "As concerning the rest of the beasts, they had their dominion taken away: yet their lives were prolonged for a season and time." Henry Folbigg (1869) elaborated on this verse:

It is here predicted that after the destruction of the papal beast, "the rest of the beasts," by which I understand the Pagan, Mahometan, Hindoo, Chinese, and other empires, "will have their dominion taken away," that is, they will gradually lose their dominion, perhaps be conquered and lose their heathen rulers—"but their lives"—the existence of various corrupt "and unchristian principles, " will be prolonged for a season and a time," which, if intended to be taken in the usual prophetic and symbolic sense would indicate a period of 450 years. This would extend far into the Millennium, and therefore although we may and should look for, and hasten the coming of great and beneficial changes, we are not to expect universal civilization in a day, nor the conversion of the world in a year—but rather the gradual yet more rapid spread of the gospel and the spiritual reign of Christ and his saints—of Christ and his Church for 1,000 years.

Prior to Adam Clarke (Methodist), Jonathan Edwards, an Evangelical Reformed (Congregational) theologian commented on the views of his more well-known predecessors and contemporaries, and wrote that Sir Isaac Newton, Robert Fleming (Presbyterian), Moses Lowman (Presbyterian), Phillip Doddridge (Congregational), and Bishop Thomas Newton (Anglican), were in agreement that the 1,260 timeline should be calculated from the year 756 AD.

F.A. Cox (Congregationalist) confirmed that this was the view of Sir Isaac Newton and others, including himself:

The author adopts the hypothesis of Fleming, Sir Isaac Newton, and Lowman, that the 1260 years commenced in A.d. 756; and consequently that the millennium will not begin till the year 2016.

Thomas Williams also acknowledged that this was the predominant view among the leading Protestant theologians of his time:

Mr. Lowman, though an earlier commentator, is (we believe) far more generally followed; and he commences the 1260 days from about 756, when, bv aid of Pepin, King of France, the pope obtained considerable temporalities. This carries on the reign of Popery to 2016, or sixteen years into the commencement of the Millennium, as it is generally reckoned.

The timeline was also printed in other denominational publications including Lutheran, Reformed, Baptist, Unitarian (Socinian), and in countries with sizeable Protestant populations such as the United Kingdom, France, Germany, Netherlands and the United States.

Catholicon, a monthly Catholic publication, implied (1816) that this timeline was more accurate than the other predictions of the time:

Lowman, who allowing the greatest latitude, comes in our opinion nearest to the truth, to the distant year 2016.

In 1870 the newly formed Kingdom of Italy annexed the remaining Papal States, depriving the pope of his temporal rule. Unaware that Papal rule would be restored, (albeit on a greatly diminished scale) in 1929 as head of the Vatican City state, the historicist view that the Papacy is the Antichrist rapidly declined in popularity as one of the defining characteristics of the Antichrist (i.e. that he would also be a political temporal power at the time of the return of Jesus) was no longer met.

In spite of its one time predominance, the 2016 prediction was largely forgotten and no major Protestant denomination currently subscribes to this timeline.

=== 2300 year prophecy ===
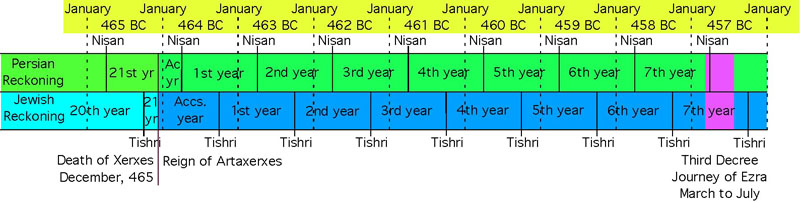
Beginning of the 70 Weeks: The decree of Araxerses in the 7th year of his reign (457 BC) as recorded in Ezra marks beginning of 70 weeks. King reigns were counted from New Year to New Year following an 'Accession Year'. The Persian New Year began in Nisan (March–April). The Jewish civil New Year began in Tishri (September–October).

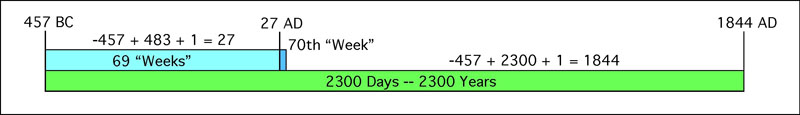
Seventh-day Adventist interpretation of the 2300-day prophecy time line and its relation to the 70-week prophecy

The distinctly Seventh-day Adventist doctrine of the divine investigative judgment beginning in 1844, based on the 2300 day prophecy of Daniel 8:14, relies on the day-year principle. The 2300 days are understood to represent 2300 years stretching from 457 BC, the calculated starting date of the 70 weeks prophecy based on the 3rd decree found in Ezra, to 1844.

The prophecy of 2300 days in Verse 14 plays an important role in Seventh-day Adventist eschatology. The Seventh-day Adventist Church traces its origins to the William Miller, who predicted that the second coming of Jesus would occur in 1844 by assuming that the cleansing of the Sanctuary of Daniel 8:14 meant the destruction of the earth, and applying the day-year principle.

The prophetic time always uses the day-year principle, thus "2300 days" was understood to be 2300 years. Starting at the same time as the Prophecy of Seventy Weeks found in Chapter 9, on the grounds that the 70 weeks were "decreed" (actually "cut off") for the Jewish people from the 2300-day prophecy. This beginning year is calculated to be 457 BC (see details here), then the end of the 2300 years would have been in 1844.

Although the Millerites originally thought that 1844 represented the end of the world, those who later became Seventh-day Adventist reached the conclusion that 1844 marked the beginning of a divine pre-advent judgment called "the cleansing of the sanctuary". It is intimately related to the history of the Seventh-day Adventist Church and was described by the church's prophet and pioneer Ellen G. White as one of the pillars of Adventist belief.

== Baháʼí Faith application ==
=== Baháʼí recognition of the 2300 day-year prophecy ===
Followers of the Baháʼí Faith also recognize the Day-Year Principle and use it in understanding prophecy from the Bible. In the book, Some Answered Questions, `Abdu'l-Bahá outlines a similar calculation for the 2300-year prophecy as given in the Christian section above. By applying the day-year principle, he demonstrates that the fulfillment of the vision of Daniel occurred in the year 1844, the year of the Báb's declaration in Persia i.e. the starting date of the Baháʼí Faith. This is the same year that the Millerites predicted for the return of Christ, and Baháʼís believe that William Miller's methodologies were indeed sound.

The prophecy states "For two thousand three hundred days; then the sanctuary shall be cleansed." (Daniel 8:14) Baháʼís understand the "cleansing of the sanctuary" to be the restoration of religion to a state in which it is guided by authorities appointed by its founder rather than by people who have appointed themselves as the authority. (The leaders of Sunni Islam were self-appointed; the first 12 leaders of Shia Islam had been appointed through a chain of succession going back to Muhammad, but that chain ended after 260 years—see next section below.) Thus Baháʼís believe that divinely-guided religion was re-established in 1844 with the revelation of the Báb, continued through the revelation of the Baháʼí founder (Baha'u'llah) and continues today through their Universal House of Justice, elected according to the method described by Baha'u'llah.

Although Christians have generally expected their Messiah to appear somewhere in Judeo-Christian lands, Baháʼís have noted that Daniel himself was in Persia at the time the prophecy was made. He was in Shushan (modern day Susa or Shūsh, Iran), when he received his prophetic vision (Daniel 8:2). The Bab appeared 2300 years later in Shiraz, about 300 miles away from where Daniel's vision occurred.

=== Convergence of 1260-day prophecy and the 2300-day prophecy ===
The year 1260 was significant in Shia Islam, independently of any Biblical reference. The Shia branch of Islam followed a series of 12 Imams, whose authority they traced back to Muhammad. The last of these disappeared in the Islamic year 260 AH. According to a reference in the Qur'an, authority was to be re-established after 1,000 years. For this reason, there was widespread anticipation among Shi'ites that the 12th Imam would return in Islamic year 1260 AH. This is also the year 1844 AD in the Christian calendar. Thus both the Millerites and the Shi'ites were expecting their Promised One to appear in the same year, although for entirely independent reasons.

Therefore, Baháʼís understand the 1260-day prophecies in both Daniel and in the Book of Revelation as referring to the year 1260 of the Islamic calendar which corresponds to the year 1844 AD, the year the Báb pronounced himself to be a Messenger of God and the year that the Baháʼí Faith began.

=== Day-year principle in Revelation 9:15 (391 days) ===
Baháʼís have also applied the Day-Year principle to Rev. 9:15 which states, "And the four angels were loosed, which were prepared for an hour, and a day, and a month, and a year, for to slay the third part of men."

The slaying of "the third part of men" was interpreted by some Christian scholars to refer to the fall of the Eastern Orthodox part of Christianity, centered on Constantinople in the year 1453 AD. (The other two-thirds being the Western Christian world, centered on Rome, and the southern part of the Christian world in North Africa, which was already under the dominion of Islam long before 1453.) Using the day-year principle, the formula gives 1+30+360 days = 391 days = 391 years after 1453. Adding 391 years to 1453 brings the prediction again to 1844, the same year as the 2300 day prophecy of Daniel 8.

Theoretically, this prophecy could be taken one step further, since there are accurate records of the dates of the start and end of battle for Constantinople. If "the hour" is taken to be 1/24th of a day, then, by the day-year principle, it would equate to 1/24 of a year i.e. 15 days. Since the battle of Constantinople lasted for several weeks, it is not possible to pin down the exact starting day of this 391-1/24-year prophecy, but if the formula is followed to this degree, it suggests the prophecy's fulfillment should have occurred sometime in May or June 1844.

=== Day-year principle in Daniel 12: 1290- and 1335-day prophecies ===
In addition, Baháʼís have applied the Day-Year principle to the two prophecies at the end of the last chapter of Daniel concerning the 1290 days (Dan 12:11) and the 1335 days (Dan 12:12). The 1290 days is understood as a reference to the 1290 years from the open declaration of Muhammad to the open declaration of Baha'u'llah. The 1335 days is understood to be a reference to the firm establishment of Islam in 628 AD to the firm establishment of the Baháʼí Faith (the election of its Universal House of Justice) in 1963 AD.

== See also ==
- Abomination of desolation
- Christian eschatology
- Daniel 7
- Daniel 8
- Day-age creationism
- Four Horsemen of the Apocalypse
- Great Disappointment
- Historicism
- Judgment day
- Premillennialism
- Prewrath
- Prophetic Year
- Posttribulation rapture
- Rapture
- Whore of Babylon
