= Arnald =

Arnald may refer to:

== Names ==
- Jan Arnald (b. 1963), Swedish novelist and literary critic
- George Arnald (1763–1841), British painter
- Richard Arnald (1698–1756), English clergyman and biblical scholar
- William Arnald (-1802), English clergyman and biblical scholar, son of Richard

== Music ==
- "Arnald", a song by Cardiacs from On Land and in the Sea
- "Arnald", a song by Eureka Machines from Leader of the Starry Skies – A Loyal Companion
