= Moses Lowman =

English nonconformist minister and Biblical commentator

Moses Lowman (1680–1752) was an English nonconformist minister, known as a Biblical commentator.

== Life ==
Born in London, he became a student at the Middle Temple in 1697, but a year later abandoned law for divinity. On 17 September 1698 he entered the university of Leyden, and studied theology at Utrecht under Gerard de Vries and Witsius.

In 1710 he became assistant to Mr. Grace, Presbyterian minister at Clapham; in 1714 he became chief minister there. He served the church in Clapham until his death.

In 1716 Lowman contributed to the second volume of the religious periodical called Occasional Papers, and in 1735 he preached, at Salters' Hall a sermon entitled The Principles of Popery Schismatical. Though very active, he does not seem to have shown ability as a preacher.

Lowman died on 2 May 1752; Samuel Chandler preached his funeral sermon.

== Works ==
Lowman entered into controversy with Anthony Collins the deist in ‘Argument from Prophecy that Jesus is the Messiah vindicated, in some considerations on the Prophecies of the Old Testament as grounds and reasons of the Christian Religion,’ a treatise written in 1718, but not printed till 1733. It was praised by John Leland.

Lowman was known as an authority on Jewish antiquities, his reputation resting mainly on his ‘Dissertation on the Civil Government of the Hebrews,’ 1740, 2nd edit., with appendix, 1745. It was written in answer to Thomas Morgan's Moral Philosopher, and said to have been approved by William Sherlock and other Anglican churchmen. Lowman's ‘Paraphrase and Notes upon the Revelation of St. John’ (1737, 1745; 1791, 1807) was commended by Philip Doddridge. It formed the concluding portion of collective editions of the ‘Commentaries’ of Simon Patrick, William Lowth, Daniel Whitby, and Richard Arnald.

Lowman's works included;

- ‘A Defence of Protestant Dissenters, in answer to Sherlock's “Vindication of the Corporation and Test Acts,”’ 1718.
- ‘Remarks on Dr. Sherlock's Answer to the Bishop of Bangor's “Common Rights of Subjects,”’ 1719.
- ‘Argument from Prophecy in proof that Jesus is the Messiah’, 1733.
- ‘An Argument to prove the Unity and Perfections of God à priori,’ 1735.
- ‘Paraphrase and Notes upon the Revelation of St. John’, 1737.
- ‘Civil Government of the Hebrews’, 1740.
- ‘Considerations on Mr. Foster's “Discourse on Jewish Theocracy,”’ 1744. Directed to the Baptist James Foster.
- ‘A Rationale of the Ritual of the Hebrew Worship, in which the design and usefulness of that Ritual are explained and vindicated,’ 1748.
- ‘A Critical Commentary and Paraphrase on the Old and New Testament and the Apocrypha; Volume 1’ (with Richard Arnald and John Rogers Pitman).
- Three posthumous tracts, with preface, revised and published by Samuel Chandler and Nathaniel Lardner, 1756.
