= Prophetic Year =

Period of time in Biblical eschatology

In Biblical eschatology a Prophetic Year or Prophetical Year is sometimes regarded as being different from an ordinary year, namely

- A 360-day period of "time"
- A 360-year period of "time", or
- A 360-year period of "time" composed of 360-day "years".

The names Apocalyptic Year and Apocalyptical Year have also been used in some literature, in obvious reference to Revelation, also known as "The Apocalypse of St. John".

There is ongoing debate but evidence put forward by advocates of the so called “Prophetic year” can be seen in the prophecies of Daniel and Revelation as seen in the use of "time, times and half a time" (i.e. 1+2+0.5=3.5), "1,260 days" and "42 months". These references represent a period of 1260 days (based on the 360 day Jewish year multiplied by 3.5). Divide 1,260 days by 42 months and you will get a 30-day month, as 12 months of 30 days equals 360-days in a year

These time periods occur ten times in scripture:

- Daniel 7:25, "time, times and a half".
- Daniel 9:27, "half one set of seven".
- Daniel 12:7, "time, times and a half".
- Revelation 11:2, "42 months".
- Revelation 11:3, "1260 days".
- Revelation 11:9, "three days and an half".
- Revelation 11:11, "three days and an half".
- Revelation 12:6, "1260 days".
- Revelation 12:14, "time, times and a half".
- Revelation 13:5, "42 months".

== Origins ==
The origin appears to be in connection mainly with the following Bible verses referring to the period translated, "time".

And he shall speak great words against the most High, and shall wear out the saints of the most High, and think to change times and laws: and they shall be given into his hand until a time and times and the dividing of time. Daniel 7:25

And I heard the man clothed in linen, which was upon the waters of the river, when he held up his right hand and his left hand unto heaven, and sware by him that liveth for ever that it shall be for a time, times, and a half; and when he shall have accomplished to scatter the power of the holy people, all these things shall be finished. Daniel 12:7

And to the woman were given two wings of a great eagle, that she might fly into the wilderness, into her place, where she is nourished for a time, and times, and half a time, from the face of the serpent. Revelation 12:14

== History ==
In ancient times, twelve thirty-day months were used making a total of 360 days for the year. Abraham, used the 360-day year, which was known in Ur. The Genesis account of the flood in the days of Noah illustrated this 360-day year by recording the 150-day interval till the waters abated from the earth. In other words, it indicates a 5-month period as being exactly 150 days in length, or five 30-day months.

We see it here in the account of the Flood:

In the six hundredth year of Noah's life, in the second month, the seventeenth day of the month, the same day were all the fountains of the great deep broken up, and the windows of heaven were opened. Genesis 7:11

And the waters prevailed upon the earth an hundred and fifty days. Genesis 7:24

And the ark rested in the seventh month, on the seventeenth day of the month, upon the mountains of Ararat. Genesis 8:4

The 150 days began on the seventeenth day of the second month, and ended on the seventeenth day of the seventh month.

== Examples in literature ==
Examples of use of the first definition:

Now this seventieth week is admittedly a period of seven years, and half of this period is three times described as "a time, times, and half a time," or "the dividing of times'"* twice as forty-two months;† and twice as 1,260 days.‡ But 1,260 days are exactly equal to forty-two months of thirty days, or three and a half years of 360 days, whereas three and a half Julian years contain 1,278 days. It follows therefore that the prophetic year is not the Julian year, but the ancient year of 360 days.§

(*) Dan. vii. 25; xii. 7; Rev. xii. 14.
† Rev. xi. 2' xiii. 5.
‡ Rev. xi. 3' xii. 6.
§ It is noteworthy that the prophecy was given at Babylon, and the Babylonian year consisted of twelve months of thirty days. That the prophetic year is not the ordinary year is no new discovery. It was noticed sixteen centuries ago by Julias Africanus in his Chronography, wherein he explains the seventy weeks to be weeks of Jewish (lunar) years, beginning with the twentieth of Artaxerxes, the fourth year of the 83rd Olympiad, and ending in the second year of the 202nd Olympiad; 475 Julian years being equal to 490 lunar years.

The second and third definition can be said to follow from application of the day for a year principle.

Examples of the third definition:

...we will find that the twelve hundred and sixty days in the Revelation, being reduced to years, are eighteen years short of Julian years in the prophetical reckoning, by reason of the additional days turned into years in the ordinary accounts now, above the Apocalyptical reckoning.

To demonstrate which, I present you with the following scheme:---

The Prophetical Year.
One 360 + One 360 = Two 720
Three 1080 + Half 180 = Three Years and a half - 1260

The Julian Year.
One 365 + One 365 = Two 730
Three 1095 + Half 183 = Three Years and a half - 1278

Now if, according to this computation, we subtract twelve hundred and sixty Apocalyptical years from twelve hundred and seventy-eight Julian or Gregorian ones ( I call them so ore rotundo, overlooking the smaller measures of time), there remain eighteen years to be cut off.

== Discussion ==
In scripture, Prophetic Years of 360 days instead of normal years of 365 days has been interpreted as being equal to prophetic months of 30 days or years. To arrive at that theory, they use "time, times, and half a time" mentioned in one verse and subsequently 42 months and 1260 days have been mentioned in other verses as found in Daniel and Revelation, these periods have been taken by many as talking about equal periods of time.

Prophetic Months Other interpretations, (reference 4) have taken instead, prophetic months as equal to an average of 30.44 days based on 365.2422 divided by 12.

== See also ==
- Day-year principle
- 2300 day prophecy
- Bible prophecy
- Book of Daniel
- Prophecy of Seventy Weeks
