= Simon Patrick =

English theologian and bishop

The Right Reverend Simon Patrick
- Bishop of Ely
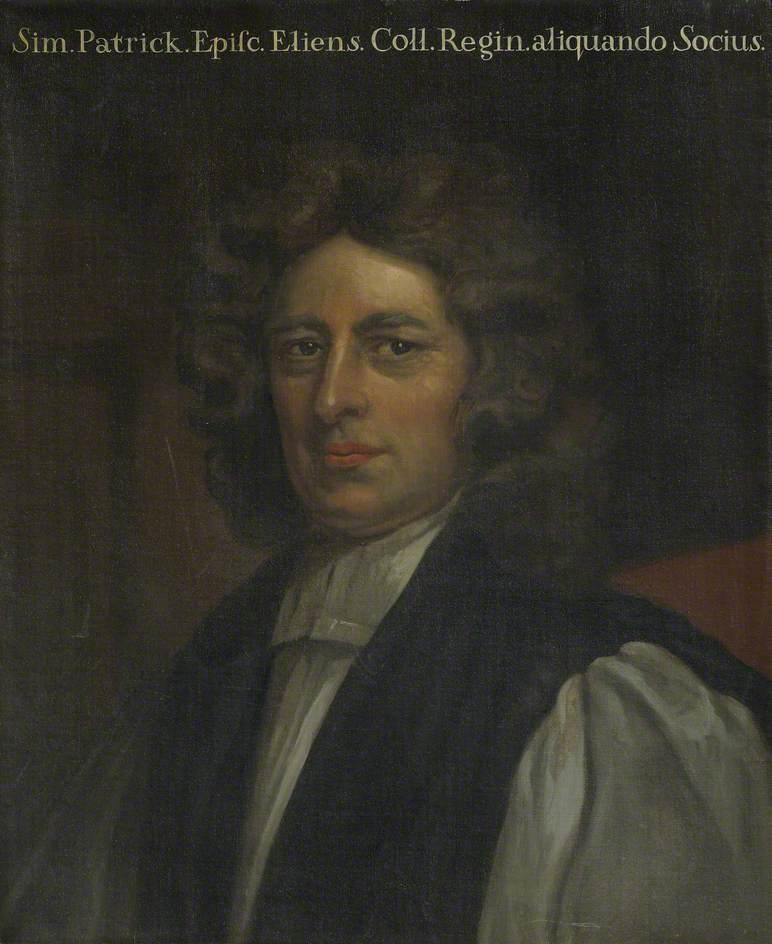
- Church: Church of England
- Diocese: Diocese of Ely
- In office: 1691–1707
- Predecessor: Francis Turner
- Successor: John Moore
- Other posts: Dean of Peterborough (1679–1689); Bishop of Chichester (1689–1691)

Personal details
- Born: 8 September 1626
- Died: 31 May 1707 (aged 80)
- Buried: Ely Cathedral
- Denomination: Anglican
- Parents: Henry Patrick (father)
- Spouse: Penelope Jephson
- Children: Simon
- Education: Boston Grammar School
- Alma mater: Queens' College, Cambridge

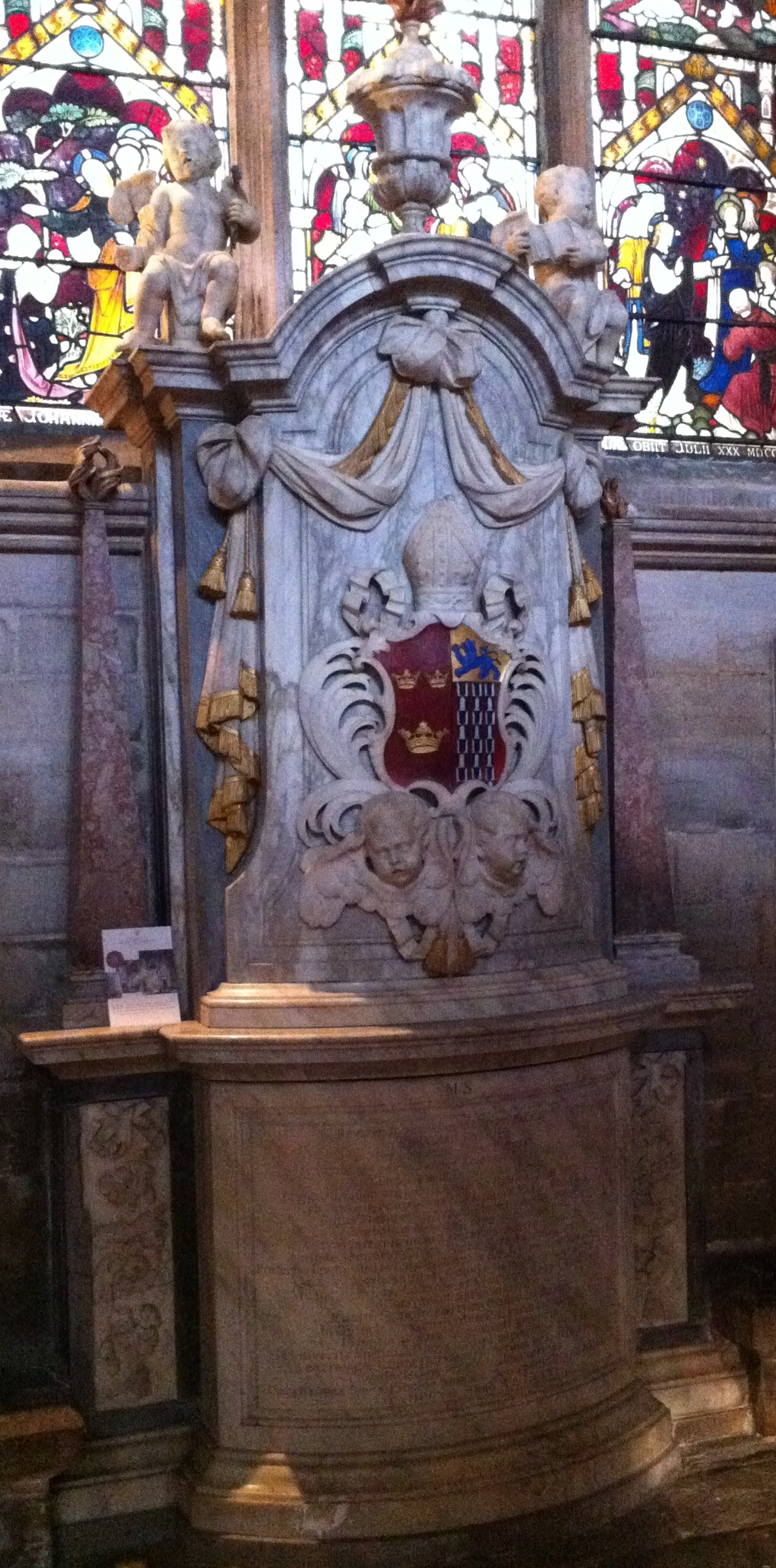
Memorial to Bishop Simon Patrick in Ely Cathedral

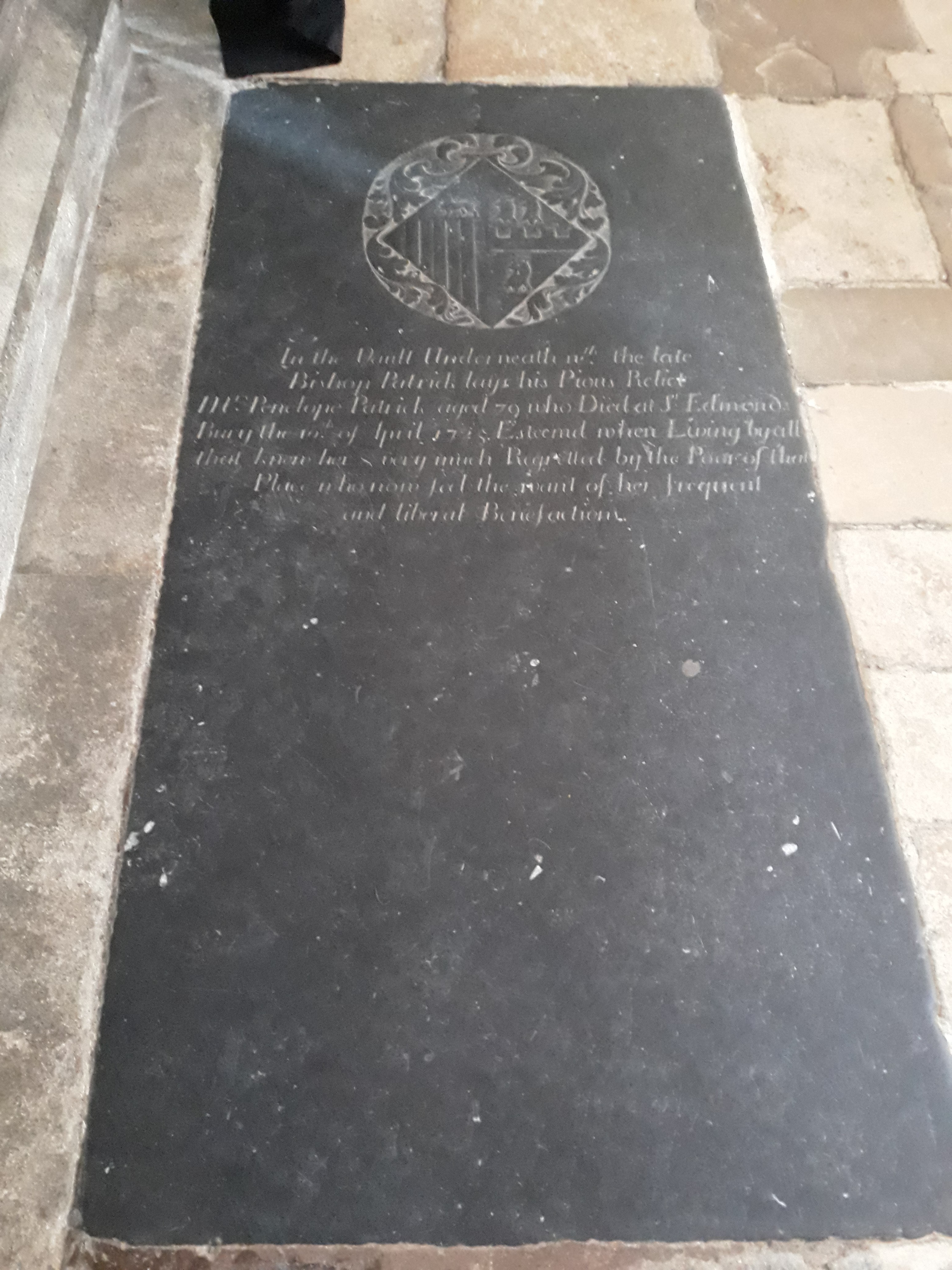
Ledger stone of Penelope Jephson, wife of Bishop Patrick, Ely Cathedral

Simon Patrick (8 September 1626 – 31 May 1707) was an English theologian and bishop.

== Life ==
He was born at Gainsborough, Lincolnshire, eldest son of Henry Patrick, a wealthy merchant, on 8 September 1626, and attended Boston Grammar School. He entered Queens' College, Cambridge, in 1644, and after taking orders in 1651 became successively chaplain to Sir Walter St. John and vicar of Battersea, Surrey. He was afterwards (1662) preferred to the rectory of St. Paul's, Covent Garden, London, where he continued to labour during the plague.

Over the same period he served as a fellow of Queens' College where 1662 junior fellows proposed him for the position of college president. He accepted the nomination and was a challenger to Anthony Sparrow, a more senior fellow who was supported by other senior fellows. The election became embroiled in controversy around the academic freedom of the college to elect its president, when during the election proceedings on 6 May, a royal mandamus was delivered stating that the King had appointed Sparrow. This was contrary to the college statutes which required the fellows elect the president. Sparrow accepted the appointment. Patrick objected, leading to a controversy that continued for two years. King Charles appointed a Commission to investigate the matter, but Patrick alleged that his supporters were not given proper opportunity to present arguments in his favour. He challenged the proceedings of the commission in court, but after two years of litigation the judges remained evenly divided on the matter and Patrick dropped the case.

He was appointed Dean of Peterborough in 1679, and Bishop of Chichester in 1689, in which year he was employed, along with others of the new bishops, to settle the affairs of the Church in Ireland. In 1691 he was translated to the see of Ely, which he held until his death on 31 May 1707. He was buried in Ely Cathedral. His memorial is by Edward Stanton.

He had Dalham Hall built.

== Works ==
His sermons and devotional writings are numerous, and his Commentary on the Historical and Poetical Books of the Old Testament, in 10 vols., going as far as the Song of Solomon, was reprinted in the 1810 Critical Commentary on the Old and New Testaments and Apocrypha, along with works of Richard Arnald, Moses Lowman, William Lowth, and Daniel Whitby.

Patrick's Friendly Debate between a Conformist and a Nonconformist was a controversial tract, defending the Five Mile Act. It excited considerable feeling at the time of its publication in 1668. Among replies was one from Samuel Rolle as Philagathus. He also contributed to a volume of Poems upon Divine and Moral Subjects (1719).

The first collected edition of his works appeared at Oxford in 1858 (9 vols.), edited by Alexander Taylor; a small Autobiography was published also at Oxford in 1839.

He is the author of the antisemitic pamphlet, "Jewish Hypocrisie, A Caveat To The Present Generation."

== Theology ==
Simon Patrick was influenced by prominent Arminian theologians such as Henry Hammond and the Cambridge Platonists, and was criticized for his Arminian belief. He is described by historians as an influential Arminian Anglican.

== Marriage ==
In 1675 he married Penelope Jephson (died 1725), a daughter of Maj. Gen. William Jephson (1609–1658), a highly influential Member of Parliament for Stockbridge, and also a substantial landowner in Mallow, County Cork, by his wife Alicia Dynham, a daughter of Sir John Dynham of Boarstall Tower, Buckinghamshire and Penelope Wenman. They had three children, two of whom died young.

== Notes and references ==
=== Sources ===
- Coffey, John (2006). John Goodwin and the Puritan Revolution : Religion and Intellectual Change in Seventeenth-Century England. Woodbridge: The Boydell Press.
- Feingold, Mordechai (1990). Before Newton: The Life and Times of Isaac Barrow. Cambridge: Cambridge university press.

=== Attribution ===
Church of England titles
Preceded by James Duport	Dean of Peterborough; 1679–1689	Succeeded by Richard Kidder
Preceded by John Lake	Bishop of Chichester; 1689–1691	Succeeded by Robert Grove
Preceded by Francis Turner	Bishop of Ely; 1691–1707	Succeeded by John Moore
