= Samuel Thomas (priest) =

English nonjuring clergyman and controversialist

Samuel Thomas (1627–1693) was an English nonjuring clergyman and controversialist.

== Life ==
Born at Ubley, Somerset, he was the son of William Thomas (1593–1667), rector of Ubley. He graduated B.A. from Peterhouse, Cambridge, in 1649, and was incorporated at Oxford on 20 August 1651. He became a Fellow of St John's College, Oxford and graduated M.A. on 17 December 1651, being incorporated at Cambridge in 1663.

In 1660 he was deprived of his fellowship by the royal commissioners, and was soon after made a chaplain or petty canon of Christ Church, Oxford where in 1672 he became a chantor. He was also vicar of St. Thomas's at Oxford, and afterwards curate of Holywell. In 1681 he became vicar of Chard in Somerset, and on 3 August of the same year was appointed to the prebend of Compton Bishop in the see of Bath and Wells.

On the accession of William III and Mary II, Thomas was one of those who refused to take the oaths of allegiance and supremacy, and he was in consequence deprived of his prebend in 1691, and in the following year of the vicarage of Chard. He died at Chard on 4 November 1693, and was buried in the chancel of the parish church.

== Works ==
Thomas was the author of:

- The Presbyterians Unmask'd, or Animadversions upon a Nonconformist Book called the Interest of England in the Matter of Religion, London, 1676; republished in 1681 under the title ‘The Dissenters Disarmed,’ without the preface, as a second part to the ‘New Distemper’ of Thomas Tomkins. The ‘Interest of England in the Matter of Religion’ was written by John Corbet. Richard Baxter termed Thomas's reply ‘a bloody invective.’
- The Charge of Schism renewed against the Separatists, London, 1680. A pamphlet written in reply to ‘An Answer to Dr. Stillingfleet's Sermon on the Mischief of Separation’ by Stephen Lobb and John Humfrey.
- Remarks on the Preface to the Protestant Reconciler [by Daniel Whitby] in a Letter to a Friend, London, 1683.

Thomas also wrote a preface to Tomkins's New Distemper, in which he assailed Richard Baxter and other nonconformists.

== Notes ==
Attribution

This article incorporates text from a publication now in the public domain: "Thomas, Samuel". Dictionary of National Biography. London: Smith, Elder & Co. 1885–1900.
