= David Jenner =

English clergyman and controversialist

D. Jenner (died 10 September 1691) was an English clergyman and controversialist.

== Life ==
He was educated at Trinity College, Cambridge, where he proceeded B.A. in 1657–8. Afterwards, he became a fellow of Sidney Sussex College and took the degree of M.A. by royal mandate in 1662, and that of B.D., also by royal mandate, in 1668.

He was installed in the prebend of Netherbury, in Salisbury Cathedral on 28 June 1676, and was instituted on 15 October 1678 to the rectory of Great Warley, Essex, which he resigned in or about October 1687. He was also chaplain to the king. He died in 1691.

== Works ==
He published, besides two separate sermons (1676 and 1680):

- ‘Beaufrons, or a new Discovery of Treason under the Fair Face and Mask of Religion, and of Liberty of Conscience,’ London, 1683–4; a reply to Daniel Whitby's Protestant Reconciler, 1683.
- ‘The Prerogative of Primogeniture: shewing that the right of Succession to an Hereditary Crown depends not upon Grace, Religion, &c., but onely upon Birth-Right and Primogeniture; and that the Chief Cause of all, or most, Rebellions in Christendom, is a Fanatical Belief that Temporal Dominion is founded in Grace,’ London, 1685; dedicated to James, Duke of York.
