= John Lightfoot =

English churchman, rabbinical scholar (1602–1675)

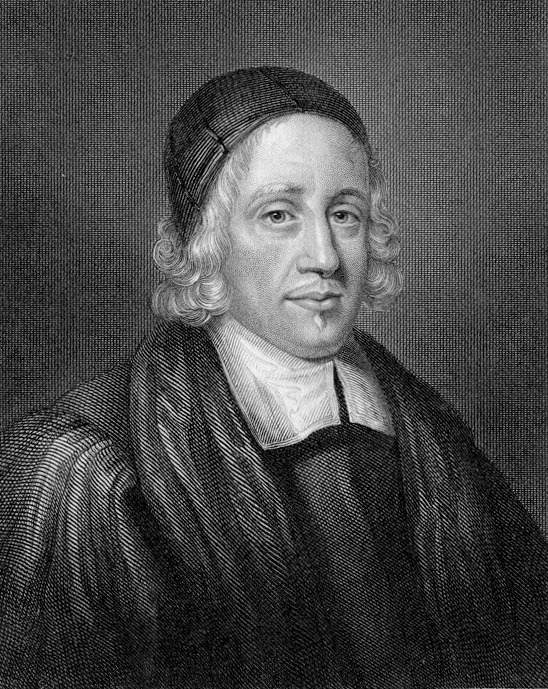
John Lightfoot

John Lightfoot (29 March 1602 – 6 December 1675) was an English churchman, rabbinical scholar, Vice-Chancellor of the University of Cambridge and Master of St Catharine's College, Cambridge.

== Life ==
He was born in Stoke-on-Trent, the son of Thomas Lightfoot, vicar of Uttoxeter, Staffordshire. He was educated at Morton Green near Congleton, Cheshire, and at Christ's College, Cambridge, where he was regarded as the best orator among the undergraduates. After taking his degree he became assistant master at Repton School in Derbyshire; after taking orders, he was appointed curate of "Norton-under-Hales" (i.e. Norton in Hales) in Shropshire. There he attracted the notice of Sir Rowland Cotton, an amateur Hebraist, who made him his domestic chaplain at Bellaport. Shortly after the removal of Sir Rowland to London, Lightfoot, abandoning an intention to go abroad, accepted a charge at Stone, Staffordshire, where he continued for about two years. From Stone he removed to Hornsey, near London, for the sake of reading in the library of Sion College.

In September 1630 he was presented by Cotton to the rectory of Ashley, Staffordshire, where he remained until June 1642. He then went to London, probably to supervise the publication of his work, A Few and New Observations upon the Book of Genesis: the most of them certain; the rest, probable; all, harmless, strange and rarely heard of before. Soon after his arrival in London he became minister of St Bartholomew's Church, near the Exchange.

Lightfoot was one of the original members of the Westminster Assembly; his "Journal of the Proceedings of the Assembly of Divines from January 1, 1643 to December 31, 1644" is a valuable historical source for the brief period to which it relates. He was assiduous in his attendance, and, though frequently standing alone, especially in the Erastian controversy, he exercised considerable influence on the outcome of the discussions of the Assembly.

He was made Master of Catharine Hall (renamed St Catharine's College) by the parliamentary visitors of Cambridge in 1643, and also, on the recommendation of the Assembly, was promoted to the rectory of Much Munden, Hertfordshire; he kept both appointments until his death.

In 1654 Lightfoot had been chosen vice-chancellor of the University of Cambridge, but continued to live at Munden, in the rectory of which, as well as in the mastership of Catharine Hall, he was confirmed at the Restoration.

While travelling from Cambridge to Ely, where he had been collated in 1668 by Sir Orlando Bridgeman to a prebendal stall, he caught a severe cold, and died at Ely. Lightfoot bequeathed his library of Old Testament books and documents to Harvard University. It was destroyed in a fire at Harvard in 1764.

== Works ==
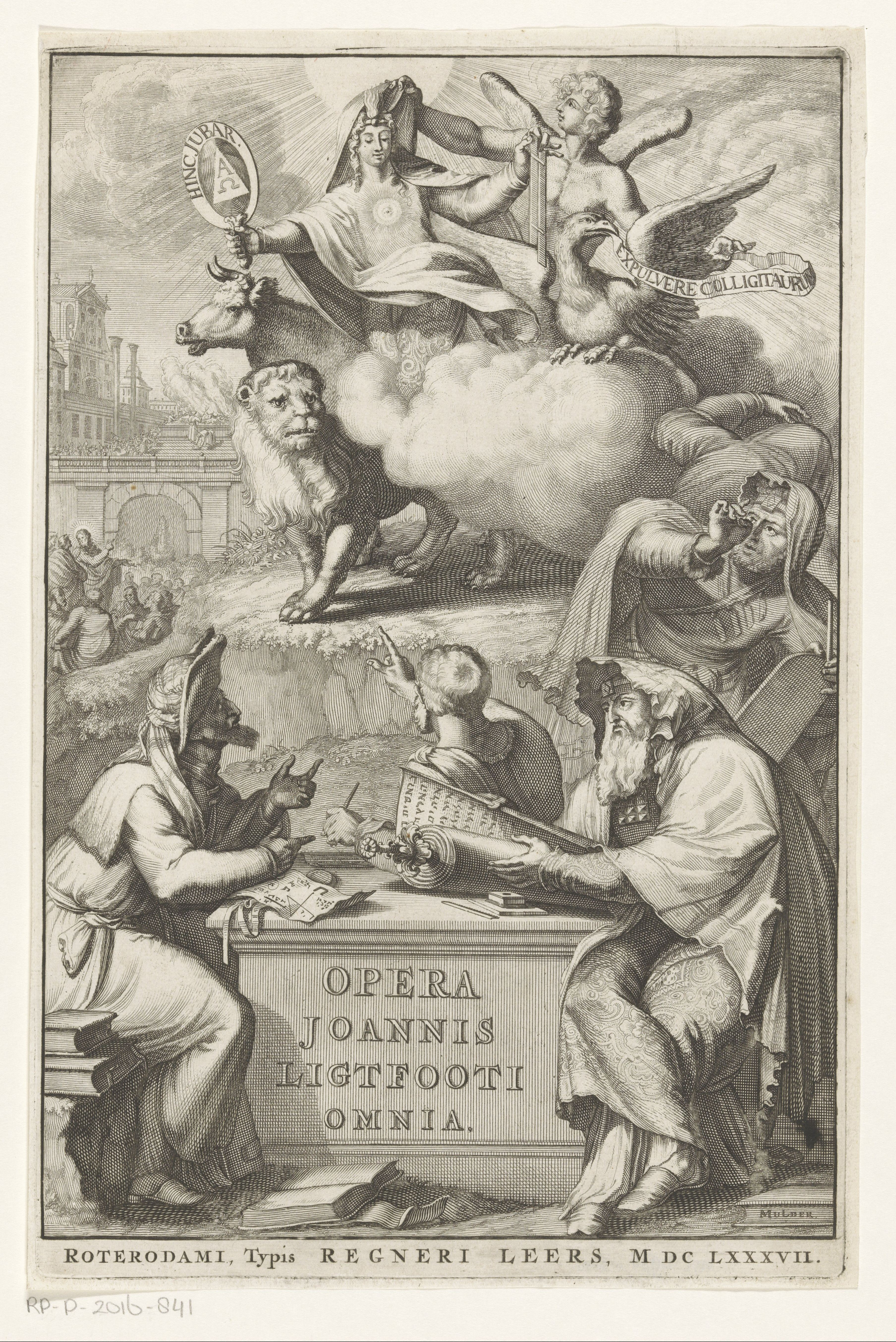
John Lightfoot. Opera omnia. Rotterdam: Reinier Leers, 1686.

His first published work, entitled Erubhin, or Miscellanies, Christian and Judaical, written in his spare time and dedicated to Cotton, appeared in London in 1629.

In 1643 Lightfoot published A Handful of Gleanings out of the Book of Exodus. Also in 1643 he was appointed to preach the sermon before the House of Commons on occasion of the public fast of 29 March. It was published under the title of Elias Redivivus, the text being Luke 1:17; in it a parallel is drawn between the John the Baptist's ministry and the work of reformation which in the preacher's judgment was incumbent on the Parliament of his own day.

In 1644 the first instalment of an unfinished work was published in London. The full title was The Harmony of the Four Evangelists among themselves, and with the Old Testament, with an explanation of the chiefest difficulties both in Language and Sense: Part I. From the beginning of the Gospels to the Baptism of our Saviour. The second part, From the Baptism of our Saviour to the first Passover after, followed in 1647, and the third, From the first Passover after our Saviour's Baptism to the second, in 1650. On 26 August 1645 he again preached before the House of Commons on the day of their monthly fast. His text was Revelation 20:1–2.

In these books he dated Creation to 3929 BC (see Ussher chronology). Understanding of Lightfoot's precise meaning has been complicated by an 1896 misquotation of him cited by Andrew Dickson White.

Rejecting the doctrine of the millenarian sects, Lightfoot had various practical suggestions for the repression of current "blasphemies", for a thorough revision of the Authorized Version of the Scriptures (On a fresh revision of the English New Testament), for the encouragement of a learned ministry, and for a speedy settlement of the church. A Commentary upon the Acts of the Apostles, ironic and critical; the Difficulties of the text explained, and the times of the Story cast into annals. From the beginning of the Book to the end of the Twelfth Chapter. With a brief survey of the contemporary Story of the Jews and Romans (down to the third year of Claudius) was published later that year. In 1647 came The Harmony, Chronicle, and Order of the Old Testament, followed in 1655 by The Harmony, Chronicle, and Order of the New Testament, inscribed to Oliver Cromwell.

He helped Brian Walton with the Polyglot Bible (1657). His own best-known work was the Horae Hebraicae et Talmudicae, in which the volume relating to the Gospel of Matthew appeared in 1658, that relating to the Gospel of Mark in 1663, and those relating to 1 Corinthians, John, and Luke, in 1664, 1671, and 1674 respectively.

The Horae Hebraicae et Talmudicae impensae in Acta Apostolorum et in Ep. S. Pauli ad Romanos were published posthumously.

== Editions ==
The Works of Lightfoot were first edited, in 2 vols. fol., by George Bright and John Strype in 1684.

The Opera Omnia, cura Joh. Texelii, appeared at Rotterdam in 1686 (2 vols. fol.), and again, edited by Johann Leusden, at Franeker in 1699 (3 vols. 101.). A volume of Remains was published at London in 1700.

The Hor. Hebr. et Talm. were also edited in Latin by Johann Benedict Carpzov (Leipzig, 1675–1679), and again, in English, by Robert Gandell (Oxford, 1859).

The most complete edition is that of the Whole Works, in 13 vols. 8vo. edited, with a life, by John Rogers Pitman (London, 1822–1825). It includes, besides the works already noticed, numerous sermons, letters and miscellaneous writings; and also The Temple, especially as it stood in the Days of our Saviour (London, 1650).

Academic offices
Preceded by William Spurstowe	Master of St Catharine's College, Cambridge; 1650–1675	Succeeded by John Eachard
