= Thomas Morgan (deist) =

English deist

Thomas Morgan (died 1743) was an English deist.

== Biography ==
Morgan was first a dissenter preacher, then a practicer of healing among the Quakers, and finally a writer.

He was the author of a large three-volume work entitled The Moral Philosopher. It is a dialogue between a Christian Jew, Theophanes, and a Christian deist, Philalethes. According to Orr, this book did not add many new ideas to the deistic movement, but did vigorously restate and give new illustrations to some of its main ideas. The first volume of The Moral Philosopher appeared anonymously in the year 1737. It was the most important of the three volumes, the other two being mostly replies to critics of the first volume. John Leland, John Chapman and others answered the first volume of Morgan's book, and it was these answers that prompted Morgan to write the second and third volumes.

His particular antipathy was to Judaism and the Old Testament, although he by no means accepted the New Testament. He favored Gnosticism, and called himself a "Christian deist". He asserted that the conflict between the Apostle Paul and Peter in Galatians shows that Paul was a true follower of Jesus whereas Peter and James were not following Jesus' teachings à la Paul.

The positive aspect of Morgan's teachings included all of the articles of natural religion formulated by Lord Herbert of Cherbury. The negative part of Morgan's work was much more extensive than the positive, and included an attack on the Bible, especially the Old Testament.

== Morgan's View on Prayer, Divine Inspiration, and Miracles ==
Recently the scholar Joseph Waligore has shown in his article "The Piety of the English Deists" that Thomas Morgan believed in divine guidance and offered instruction on how to prepare oneself to receive it. To receive divine inspiration, he counseled, one must rein in his personal desires and abandon all concern for wealth, power, ambition, or physical gratifications. Abandoning worldly desires, one might then enter into what he called "silent Solitude." After a person did this, he can be divinely inspired. "When a man does this, he converses with God, he derives Communication of Light and Knowledge from the eternal Father and Fountain of it; he receives Intelligence and Information from eternal Wisdom, and hears the clear intelligible Voice of his Maker and Former speaking to his silent, undisturb'd attentive Reason." However, right after the statements just quoted, the dialogue's orthodox Christian interlocutor then said that this position was religious enthusiasm: "I see there is a sort of enthusiasm, which you not only allow, but naturally run into, and cannot help it." Morgan did not deny this charge of enthusiasm.

Waligore also has shown that Thomas Morgan wrote an extremely pious prayer which emphasized his dependence on God and called on God to continually lead him. He said:

O thou eternal Reason, Father of Light, and immense Fountain of all Truth and Goodness; suffer me, with the deepest Humility and Awe to apply to and petition thee. . . . I own, therefore, O Father of Spirits, this natural, necessary Dependence upon thy constant, universal Presence, Power and Agency. Take me under the constant, uninterrupted Protection and Care of thy Divine Wisdom, Benignity and All-sufficiency: Continue to irradiate my Understanding with Beams of immutable, eternal Reason. Let this infallible Light from Heaven inform and teach me. . . . if I should err from the Way of Truth, and wander in the Dark, instruct me by a fatherly Correction; let Pains and Sorrows fetch me home, and teach me Wisdom; . . . for ever bless me with the enlightening, felicitating Influence of thy benign Presence, Power and Love.

Thomas Morgan is a good example of a deist that believed in immutable laws, but one that also believed in particular providences or miracles. In one of his later works, Morgan said God does not break the general laws he has made by doing miracles:

God governs the World, and directs all Affairs, not by particular and occasional, but by general, uniform and established Laws; and the Reason why he does not miraculously interpose, as they would have him, by suspending or setting aside the general, established Laws of Nature and Providence, is, because this would subvert the whole Order of the Universe, and destroy all the Wisdom and Contrivance of the first Plan.

It seems Morgan's insistence on immutable laws leaves no room for miracles. Nevertheless, in the same book, he said he believed in miracles; it is just these miracles were done by angels in accordance with the general, established laws of nature.

Morgan sought to explain angelic miracles by a comparison to animal husbandry. He said that humans care for animals and control their lives without breaking general laws, and from the animals' point of view our work must seem miraculous or "all particular Interposition, and supernatural Agency." In the same way, Morgan asserted, the angels can do what seem like miracles to us without breaking the uniform laws of nature. He said that if we could see the "other intelligent free Agents above us, who have the same natural establish'd Authority and Command over us, as we have with regard to the inferior Ranks and Classes of Creatures, the Business of Providence, moral Government, and particular Interpositions by general Laws of Nature would be plain enough."

== Works ==
Morgan's writings are:

1. 'Philosophical Principles of Medicine,' 1725; 2nd edit., corrected, 1730.
2. ' A Collection of Tracts . . . occasioned by the late Trinitarian Controversy,' 1726. The tracts on the Trinitarian controversy include the following reprints (dates of original publication are added) : ' The Nature and Consequences of Enthusiasm considered ... in a letter to Mr. Tong, Mr. Robinson, Mr. Smith, and Mr. Reynolds' (four ministers who had supported the subscribing party at the Salters' Hall conference), 1719; a defence of this against Samuel Fancourt's 'Certainty and Infallibility,' 1720; another defence against Fancourt's 'Enthusiasm Retorted,' 1722; 'The Absurdity of Opposing Faith to Reason,' against Thomas Bradbury, another writer on the same controversy, whom he had also attacked in a postscript to his first tract, 1722; the 'Grounds and Principles of Christian Communion,' 1720; a 'Letter to Sir Richard Blackmore, in reply to his 'Modern Arians Unmasked,' 1721; a 'Refutation of ... Mr. Joseph Pyke,' author of an 'Impartial View,' with further remarks on Richard Blackmore, 1722; a 'Letter to Dr. Waterland, occasioned by his late writings in defence of the Athanasian hypotheses,' 1722 (?); 'Enthusiasm in Distress,' an examination of ' Reflections upon Reason,' in a letter to Philileutherus Britannicus,' 1722, with two postscripts in 1723 and 1724.
3. 'A Letter to Mr. Thomas Chubb, occasioned by his "Vindication of Human Nature," ' 1727, followed by ' A Defence of Natural and Revealed Religion,' occasioned by Thomas Chubb's 'Scripture Evidence,' 1728 (in defence of the views of Robert Barclay, the quaker apologist).
4. 'The Mechanical Practice of Physic,' 1735.
5. 'The Moral Philosopher, in a dialogue between Philalethes, a Christian Deist, and Theophanus, a Christian Jew ' [anon.], 1737; 2nd edit. 1738. A second volume, in answer to John Leland and John Chapman, by Philalethes appeared in 1739, and a third, against Leland and Moses Lowman, in 1740. A fourth volume, called 'Physico Theology,' appeared in 1741.
6. 'Letter to Dr. Cheyne in defence of the "Mechanical Practice,"' addressed to George Cheyne, 1738.
7. 'Vindication of the "Moral Philosopher,"' against Samuel Chandler, 1741.
8. 'The History of Joseph considered ... by Philalethes,' in answer to Chandler, 1744.
