= Robert Lowth =

English bishop and grammarian (1710–1787)

The Right Reverend and Right Honourable Robert Lowth FRS
- Bishop of London
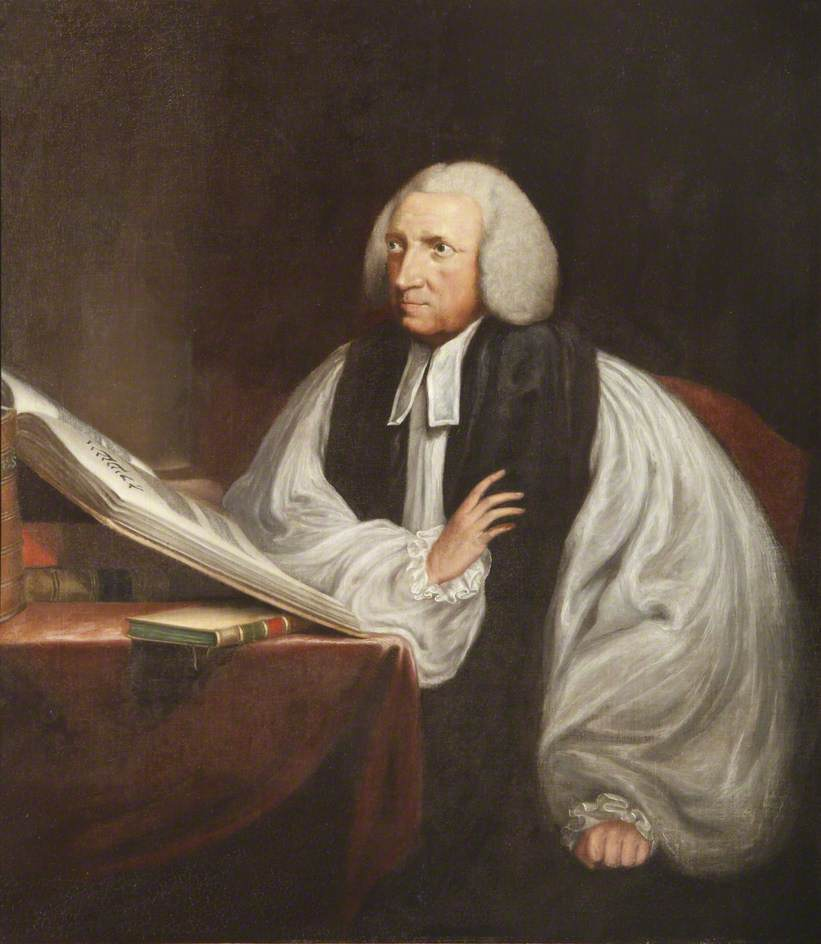
- Portrait by Robert Edge Pine
- Church: Church of England
- Diocese: Diocese of London
- Elected: 1777
- Predecessor: Richard Terrick
- Successor: Beilby Porteus
- Other posts: Bishop of Oxford; 1766–1777; Bishop of St Davids; 1766; Archdeacon of Winchester; 1750–1766; Professor of Poetry; 1741–1752

Orders
- Ordination: 1735
- Consecration: 1766

Personal details
- Born: 27 November 1710 Hampshire, England
- Died: 3 November 1787 (aged 76)
- Buried: All Saints Church, Fulham
- Denomination: Anglican
- Parents: William Lowth
- Profession: Academic (poetry & English grammar)
- Education: New College, Oxford

Robert Lowth (/laʊð/; 27 November 1710 – 3 November 1787) was an English clergyman and academic who served as the Bishop of Oxford, Bishop of St Davids, Professor of Poetry and the author of one of the most influential textbooks of English grammar.

== Life ==
Lowth was born in Hampshire, England, Great Britain, the son of Dr William Lowth, a clergyman and Biblical commentator. He was educated at Winchester College and became a scholar of New College, Oxford in 1729. Lowth obtained his BA in 1733 and his Master of Arts degree in 1737. In 1735, while still at Oxford, Lowth took orders in the Anglican Church and was appointed vicar of Ovington, Hampshire, a position he retained until 1741, when he was appointed Oxford Professor of Poetry.

Bishop Lowth made a translation of the Book of Isaiah, first published in 1778. The Seventh-day Adventist theologian E. J. Waggoner said in 1899 that Lowth's translation of Isaiah was "without doubt, as a whole, the best English translation of the prophecy of Isaiah".

In 1750 he was appointed Archdeacon of Winchester. In 1752 he resigned the professorship at Oxford and married Mary Jackson. Shortly afterwards, in 1753, Lowth was appointed rector of East Woodhay. In 1754 he was awarded a Doctorate in Divinity by Oxford University, for his treatise on Hebrew poetry entitled Praelectiones Academicae de Sacra Poesi Hebraeorum (On the Sacred Poetry of the Hebrews). This derives from a series of lectures and was originally published in Latin. An English translation was published by George Gregory in 1787 as "Lectures on the Sacred Poetry of the Hebrews". This and subsequent editions include the life of Bishop Lowth as a preface. There was a further edition issued in 1815. This was republished in North America in 1829 with some additional notes. However, apart from those notes, the 1829 edition is less useful to a modern reader. This is because the editor of that edition chose to revert to citing many of the scriptural passages that Lowth uses as examples, and some of the annotations by Michaelis) and others, in Latin.

Lowth was appointed a fellow of the Royal Societies of London and Göttingen in 1765. He was consecrated bishop of St Davids in Wales in 1766; however, before the end of the year he was translated to the English see of Oxford. He remained Bishop of Oxford until 1777 when he was appointed Bishop of London as well as dean of the chapel royal and privy councillor. In 1783 he was offered the chance to become Archbishop of Canterbury, but declined due to failing health.

Lowth was good friends with the Scottish Enlightenment figure David Hume, as noted by the prominent Scottish bookseller Andrew Millar. Millar commented that "Hume and he are very great, tho' one orthodox and ye other Hedretox".

Lowth wrote a Latin epitaph, Cara, Vale ("Dear one, farewell!") on the death of his daughter Maria. Much admired in the late 18th and early 19th centuries, it was set to music by the English composer John Wall Callcott.

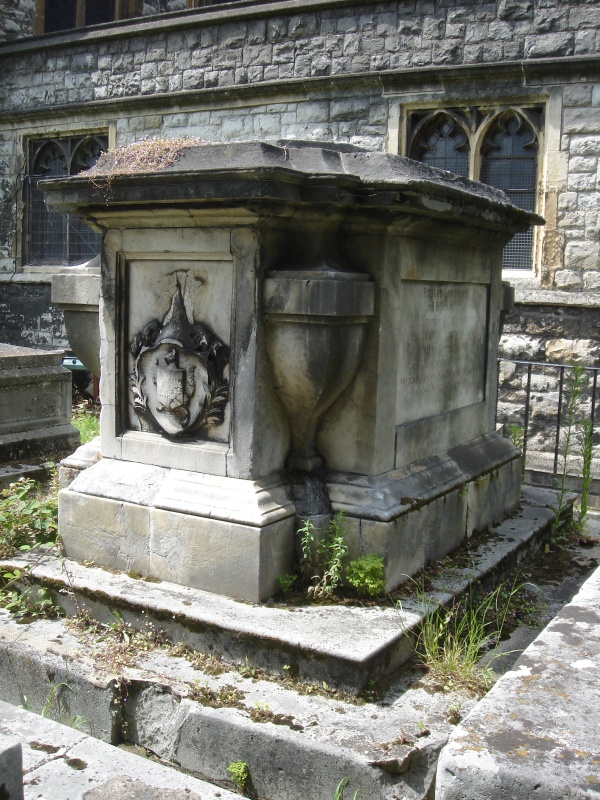
Funerary monument, All Saints, Fulham, London

Lowth died in 1787, and was buried in the churchyard of All Saints Church, Fulham. Lowth's library was sold by auction by R. H. Evans on 15 January 1823 and five following days, along with the books of his son (also Robert, Rector of Hinton Ampnor, d. 1822). There is a copy of the catalogue at Cambridge University Library (shelfmark Munby.c.126(1)).

== Old Testament scholarship ==
Lowth seems to have been the first modern Bible scholar to notice or draw attention to the poetic structure of the Psalms and much of the prophetic literature of the Old Testament. In Lecture 19 he sets out the classic statement of parallelism, which remains the most fundamental category for understanding Hebrew poetry. He identifies three forms of parallelism, the synonymous, antithetic and synthetic (i.e., balance only in the manner of expression without either synonymy or antithesis). This idea has been influential in Old Testament Studies to the present day.

== Work on English grammar ==
Lowth is also remembered for his publication in 1762 of A Short Introduction to English Grammar. Prompted by the absence of simple and pedagogical grammar textbooks in his day, Lowth set out to remedy the situation. Lowth's grammar is the source of many of the prescriptive shibboleths that are studied in schools, and established him as the first of a long line of usage commentators who judge the English language in addition to describing it. An example of both is one of his footnotes: "Whose is by some authors made the possessive case of which, and applied to things as well as persons; I think, improperly."

His most famous contribution to the study of grammar may have been his tentative suggestion that sentences ending with a preposition—such as "what did you ask for?"—are inappropriate in formal writing. (This is known as preposition stranding.) In what may have been intentional self-reference, Lowth used that very construction in discussing it. "This is an Idiom which our language is strongly inclined to; it prevails in common conversation, and suits very well with the familiar style in writing; but the placing of the Preposition before the Relative is more graceful, as well as more perspicuous; and agrees much better with the solemn and elevated Style."^{2} Others had previously expressed this opinion; the earliest known is John Dryden in 1672.

Lowth's method included criticising "false syntax"; his examples of false syntax were culled from Shakespeare, the King James Bible, John Donne, John Milton, Jonathan Swift, Alexander Pope, and other famous writers. His understanding of grammar, like that of all linguists of his period, was influenced by the study of Latin, though he was aware that this was problematic and condemned "forcing the English under the rules of a foreign Language"^{1}. Thus Lowth condemns Addison's sentence "Who should I meet the other night, but my old friend?" on the grounds that the thing acted upon should be in the "Objective Case" (corresponding, as he says earlier, to an oblique case in Latin), rather than taking this example and others as evidence from noted writers that "who" can refer to direct objects.

Lowth's dogmatic assertions appealed to those who wished for certainty and authority in their language. Lowth's grammar was not written for children; however, within a decade after it appeared, versions of it adapted for the use of schools had appeared, and Lowth's stylistic opinions acquired the force of law in the schoolroom. The textbook remained in standard usage throughout educational institutions until the early 20th century.

== Literary critic ==
Lowth has been regarded as the first imagery critic of Shakespeare's plays and highlighted the importance of the imagery in the interpretation of motives and actions of characters and dramatic movement of the plot and narrative structure.^{3}

== See also ==
- Linguistic prescription
- Lindley Murray

== Notes ==
- ^{1}A Short Introduction to English Grammar, p. 107, condemning Richard Bentley's "corrections" of some of Milton's constructions.
- ^{2}A Short Introduction to English Grammar., pp. 127–128.
- ^{3}"Notes & Queries (OUP)" in 1983 Vol. 30, pp. 55–58 by Sailendra Kumar Sen, Robert Lowth :the first imagery critic of Shakespeare.

== Citations ==
Church of England titles
Preceded by Samuel Squire	Bishop of St Davids; 1766	Succeeded by Charles Moss
Preceded by John Hume	Bishop of Oxford; 1766–1777	Succeeded by John Butler
Preceded by Richard Terrick	Bishop of London; 1777–1787	Succeeded by Beilby Porteus
