= John Leland (Presbyterian) =

English Presbyterian minister and theologian (1691–1766)

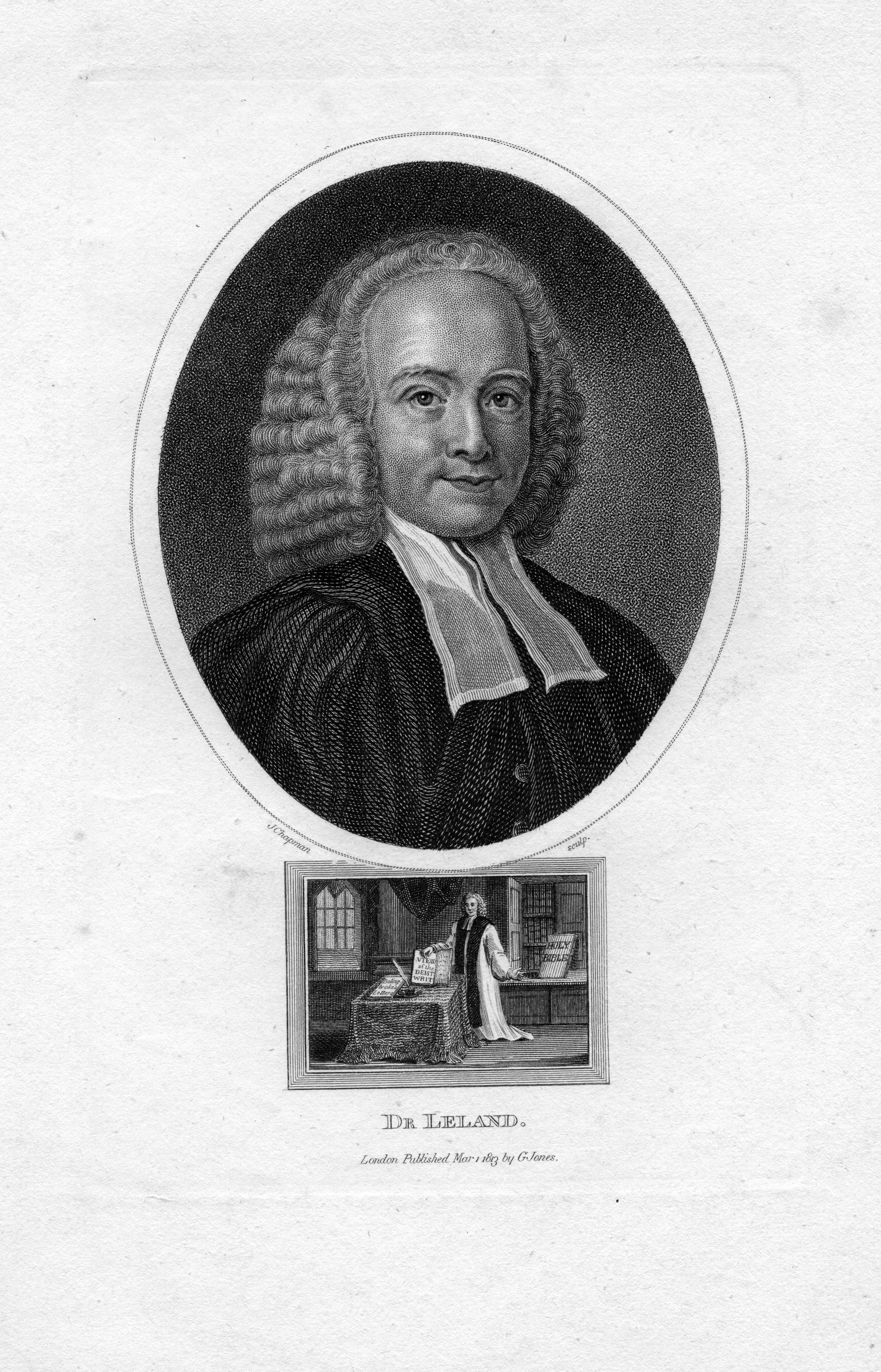
- Born: 18 October 1691; Plymouth, Lancashire, England
- Died: 1766 (aged 69–70); London, England, Great Britain
- Education: University of Aberdeen (DD)

John Leland (18 October 1691 – 1766) was an English Presbyterian minister and author of theological works.

Leland was born in Wigan, Lancashire, on 18 October 1691. He was educated in Dublin, Ireland and went into the ministry there. He was ordained co-pastor to Nathanael Weld (1660–1730) at New Row Presbyterian Church, Dublin, on 16 December 1716. The church moved to Eustace Street, Dublin in 1728. Nathanael Weld's son Isaac (1710–1778), who was named after Nathanael's friend Sir Isaac Newton, was ordained in Eustace Street in 1732 as Leland's colleague. Isaac and Charles Weld, the writers, were the grandsons of the minister Isaac and thus the great-grandsons of Nathanael. Leland received his Doctor of Divinity degree from the University of Aberdeen in 1739. His main interest was in opposing deism. He critiqued proponents of deist ideas, such as Matthew Tindal.

He is remembered as the author of A view of the principal deistical writers that have appeared in England in the last and present century: with observations upon them, and some account of the answers that have been published against them: in several letters to a friend. (1754–1755) 2 vols. (London: Printed for B. Dod) which went through many editions well into the 19th century.

A View of the Principal Deistical Writers was first published in 1754 and subsequently expanded twice. It is the fullest contemporary treatment of the literature of the deist controversy. Leland gives very detailed reviews of the works of the leading deists, and of the responses that these works provoked. At least one chapter is devoted to each of the following: Peter Annet, Charles Blount, Thomas Chubb, Anthony Collins, Lord Herbert of Cherbury, Thomas Morgan, Shaftesbury, Matthew Tindal, John Toland and Thomas Woolston. Six chapters are about David Hume's views on religion, and approximately half of the work deals with Bolingbroke.

It was said of him that, "whatever his early opinions may have been, [he] became an Arian before his death". The Eustace Street Meeting House where he ministered for 50 years, was a Presbyterian/Unitarian Congregation, eventually merging with other Unitarian groups in Dublin.

Presbyterian Church titles
Preceded by Nathaniel Weld	Minister of New Row Presbyterian Church, Dublin; Church moved to Eustace Street in 1728; 1716–1766; With: Nathaniel Weld, 1716-1730; Isaac Weld, 1732-1766	Succeeded by Isaac Weld
