= William Lowth =

English clergyman

William Lowth D.D. (1660–1732) was an English clergyman, known as a Biblical commentator.

== Life ==
He was the son of William Lowth, an apothecary, who was burnt out in the Great Fire of London, and was born in the parish of St Martin, Ludgate on 3 September 1660. He was educated by his grandfather, the Rev. Simon Lowth, rector of Tilehurst, Berkshire, and was admitted to Merchant Taylors' School on 11 September 1672. He was elected scholar of St John's College, Oxford, on 11 June 1675, and in due course became Fellow. He graduated B.A. in 1679, M.A. 1683, and B.D. 1688.

Early work brought him to the notice of Peter Mews, Bishop of Winchester, who made him his chaplain, gave him a prebendal stall at Winchester on 8 October 1696, and presented him to the benefice of Buriton with Petersfield, Hampshire, in 1699, which he held until his death. He died at Buriton on 17 May 1732, and was buried there.

== Works ==
His first published work was a ‘Vindication of the Divine Authority of the Old and New Testaments,’ London, 1692, a defence of the inspiration of holy scripture against the attacks of Jean Le Clerc. A second edition of the ‘Vindication,’ with a dissertation on the objections to the Pentateuch then current, was published in 1699. In 1708 he brought out ‘Directions for the profitable Study of Holy Scripture,’ a shortwork which went through many editions.

The work for which Lowth is best known is his ‘Commentary on the Prophets,’ originally published in separate portions between 1714 and 1725, and afterwards collected in a folio volume as a continuation of Bishop Simon Patrick's ‘Commentary on the Earlier Books of the Old Testament;’ it was frequently reprinted, together with the commentaries of Daniel Whitby, Richard Arnald, and Moses Lowman on the New Testament. Its tone is pious but cold; the exegesis is simple, direct, and brief. The commentary was praised by Bishop Richard Watson and by William Orme.

The editions of Clemens Alexandrinus by John Potter, of Josephus by John Hudson, and of the early ecclesiastical historians by William Reading, were enriched with notes by Lowth, and other scholars received help from him. He was a correspondent of Edward Chandler during his controversy with Anthony Collins the deist.

== Family ==
He married Margaret, daughter of Robert Pitt of Blandford, Dorset. They had two sons, of whom the younger was the grammarian Robert Lowth, and three daughters.
