= Polychronis =

Polychronis is a masculine Greek given name Πολυχρόνης. Notable people with the name include:

- Polychronis Lembesis (1848–1913), Greek painter
- Polychronis Tzortzakis (born 1989), Greek cyclist
- Polychronis Vezyridis (born 1974), Greek footballer
- Polychronis Tsigkas (born 2000), Greek/Cypriot basketball player
