= William Arnald =

English Anglican priest, Canon of Windsor

William Arnald BD (died 5 August 1802) was a Canon of Windsor from 1779 - 1802.

== Family ==
He was the son of Richard Arnald (died 1756) English clergyman and biblical scholar.

== Career ==
He was educated at St John's College, Cambridge and graduated BA in 1766, MA in 1769, and BD in 1776.

He was appointed:

- Chaplain to Bishop Richard Hurd of Coventry and Lichfield 1775
- Sub-Preceptor to the Prince of Wales and the Duke of York 1776–1781
- Precentor of Lichfield 1778
- Prebendary of Lichfield 1778–1797

He was appointed to the twelfth stall in St George's Chapel, Windsor Castle in 1779, and held the stall until 1802. He suffered from mental illness in the later years of his life:

The unhappy mental derangement under which he laboured for the last twenty years, was the source of real grief to a numerous circle of friends, who, attached to him by the strongest ties of esteem and affection, admired his abilities, loved the urbanity of his manners, and acknowledged the goodness of his heart.
