= Richard Arnald =

English clergyman and biblical scholar

Richard Arnald (1698 or 1700 – 4 September 1756) was a distinguished English clergyman and biblical scholar.

== Life ==
He was a native of London, and received his education at Bishop Stortford School, whence he proceeded in 1714 to Corpus Christi College, Cambridge. After graduating B.A., he removed to Emmanuel College, where he was elected to a fellowship on 24 June 1720, and took the degree of M.A. While resident at Emmanuel he printed two copies of Sapphics on the death of George I, and a sermon preached at Bishop Stortford school-feast on 3 August 1726. In 1733 he was presented to the living of Thurcaston in Leicestershire, and was afterwards made prebendary of Lincoln.

Arnald died on 4 September 1756, and was buried in Thurcaston church. His widow died in 1782.

== Works ==
He published in 1746 a sermon on 2 Kings xiv.8: The Parable of the Cedar and the Thistle exemplified in the great Victory at Culloden; and in 1760, a Sermon on Deuteronomy xxxiii.8. The work by which he is remembered is his critical commentary on the Apocryphal books. This work was published as a continuation of Simon Patrick and William Lowth's commentaries. It embraces a commentary on the Book of Wisdom, 1744; on Ecclesiasticus, 1748; on Tobit, Judith, Baruch, History of Susannah, and Bel and the Dragon, with dissertations on the two books of Esdras and Maccabees, with a translation of Calmet's treatise on the Dæmon Asmodeus, 1752. An edition was published in 1822 under the care of John Rogers Pitman.

== Family ==
William Arnald, his son, was fellow of St John's College, Cambridge, in 1767, and head-tutor in 1768. He became chaplain to Bishop Hurd in 1775, and precentor of Lichfield Cathedral. By Hurd's influence he was appointed in 1776 preceptor to the Prince of Wales and the Duke of York, and was made canon of Windsor. In January 1782 signs of insanity appeared, and he continued insane till his death on 5 August 1802.
