= Daniel Whitby =

English theologian and biblical commentator

Daniel Whitby (1638–1726) was a controversial English theologian and biblical commentator. An Arminian priest in the Church of England, Whitby was known as strongly anti-Calvinistic and later gave evidence of Unitarian tendencies.

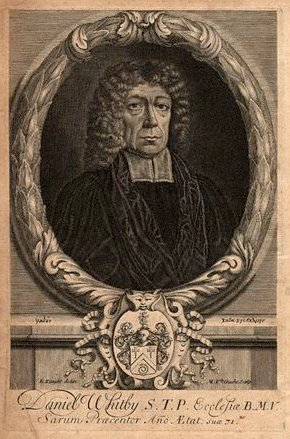
Engraving of Daniel Whitby c.1708 by Michael Vandergucht, after E. Knight.

== Life ==
The son of Thomas Whitby, rector (1631–7) of Rushden, Northamptonshire, then rector of Barrow-on-Humber, Lincolnshire, he was born at Rushden on 24 March 1638. After attending school at Caster, Lincolnshire, he became in 1653 a commoner of Trinity College, Oxford, matriculating on 23 July, when his name is written Whitbie. He was elected scholar on 13 June 1655, graduated with a Bachelor of Arts on 20 April 1657, M.A. on 10 April 1660, and was elected fellow in 1664. In the same year he came out as a writer against Roman Catholic doctrine, attacking Serenus Cressy. He was answered by John Sergeant, to whom he replied in 1666. Seth Ward, bishop of Salisbury, made him his chaplain in 1668, giving him on 22 October the prebend of Yatesbury, Wiltshire, and on 7 November the prebend of Husborn-Tarrant and Burbage.

In 1669 he became perpetual curate of St. Thomas's and rector of St. Edmund's, Salisbury. He next wrote on the evidences (1671). On 11 September 1672 he was installed precentor at Salisbury, and at once accumulated B.D. and D.D. (13 September). He resumed his anti-Catholic polemics in 1674, and continued to publish on this topic at intervals till 1689.

Whitby's reputation suffered by his anonymous publication, late in 1682, of The Protestant Reconciler, a plea for concessions to nonconformists, with a view to their comprehension. A fierce paper war followed, in which Lawrence Womock, David Jenner, and Samuel Thomas took part. In contemporary pamphlets Whitby, nicknamed Whigby, was unfavourably contrasted with Titus Oates; ironical letters of thanks were addressed to him, purporting to come from Anabaptists and others. The University of Oxford in convocation (21 July 1683) condemned the proposition 'that the duty of not offending a weak brother is inconsistent with all human authority of making laws concerning indifferent things,' and ordered Whitby's book to be burned by the university marshal in the schools quadrangle. Seth Ward extorted from Whitby a retraction (9 October 1683); and he issued a second part of the Protestant Reconciler, urging dissenters to conformity.

In 1689 Whitby wrote in favour of taking the oaths to William and Mary. He took a small part in the Socinian controversy by publishing (1691) a Latin tract on the divinity of Christ. On 14 April 1696 he received the prebend of Taunton Regis.

Whitby suffered in his later years from failing sight, and employed an amanuensis; otherwise he retained his faculties, including a tenacious memory. He was at church the day before he died; and returning home fainted and died the night following, on 24 March 1726, his eighty-eighth birthday.

== Works ==
His major work was a 'Paraphrase and Commentary on the New Testament,' begun in 1688 and published in 1700; last edition, 1822. Philip Doddridge thought it preferable to any other commentary. In his commentary he opposes John Tillotson's view of hell torments. Faith he defined as mere assent to Gospel facts as true. In 1710, Whitby challenged the critical works of John Mill and defended Textus Receptus against thirty thousand textual variants in Mill's edition of the New Testament. Of this Examen variantium Lectionum Johannis Milli use was made by Anthony Collins; it was reprinted (Leyden, 1724) by Sigebert Haverkamp.

During 1710–11 Whitby was engaged in refuting the Calvinistic positions of John Edwards. In 1710 he wrote his Discourse on the Five Points (on the Five Points of Calvinism) which eventually drew Calvinist responses from English Baptist John Gill in his The Cause of God and Truth (1735) and American Congregationalist Jonathan Edwards in his Freedom of the Will (1754).

Whitby is usually ranked as an Arminian. However, his views regarding original sin were not in line with historical Arminianism. In the Bangorian controversy he wrote (1714 and 1718) in defence of Benjamin Hoadly. On the doctrine of our Lord's deity, which he had defended in 1691 and had upheld throughout his New Testament commentary (1703), he was affected by the treatise (1712) of Samuel Clarke, as shown by his later criticisms of George Bull and Daniel Waterland.

A later Latin dissertation (1714) rejects the authority of the fathers as interpreters of Scripture, or as entitled to determine controversies respecting the Trinity. He had been led to this position by his antagonism (1707) to the arguments on which Henry Dodwell the elder based his rejection of the natural immortality of the soul. He made further use of it in criticisms directed (1718) against Bull and (1720–1) Waterland.

The extent of his departure from conventional opinion was not revealed till the posthumous publication in April 1727 of his Last Thoughts, which he calls his 'retractation,' and which 'clearly shows his unitarianism'.

Concerning the Whitby's position in respect of the Roman Catholic Church, he published the 1674 pamphlet A discourse concerning the idolatry of the Church of Rome, which was followed by A treatise in confutation of the Latin service practised and, by the order of the Trent Council, continued in the Church of Rome and also by The fallibility of the Roman Church : demonstrated from the manifest error of the 2d Nicene & Trent councils : which assert that the veneration and honorary worship of images is a tradition primitive and apostolical (London, 1687). At least from 1699 until 1702, Whitby was also a close friend and an epistolary correspondent of John Locke (1632 – 28 October 1704), which a short time before was returned from Netherlands to the Lady Masham's country house in Essex.

== Views on the Millennium ==
Whitby is considered by many to have systematised postmillennialism, even if seeds of this millennialist belief were sown long before with persons such as Augustine. Although Whitby may have been an Arminian minister, postmillennialism is now commonly associated with Calvinist and Covenantal churches, specifically Reconstructionist churches.

Clarence Larkin wrote:

"...a new interpretation of the Millennial Reign of Christ was demanded. This interpretation was furnished by the Rev. Daniel Whitby (1638–1726), a clergyman of the Church of England, who claimed that in reading the promises made to the Jews in the Old Testament of their restoration as a nation, and the re-establishment of the Throne of David, he was led to see that these promises were spiritual and applied to the Church. This view he called a 'New Hypothesis.'...

"His 'New Hypothesis' was that by the preaching of the Gospel Mohammedanism would be overthrown, the Jews converted, the Papal Church with the Pope (Antichrist) would be destroyed, and there would follow a 1000 years of righteousness and peace known as the Millennium; at the close of which there would be a short period of Apostasy, ending in the return of Christ."

== See also ==
- Textus Receptus
