= Investigative judgment =

Seventh-day Adventist doctrine

The investigative judgment, or pre-Advent Judgment (or, more precisely, the pre-Second Advent Judgment), is a unique Seventh-day Adventist doctrine which asserts that the divine judgment of professed Christians has been in progress since 1844. It is intimately related to the history of the Seventh-day Adventist Church and was described by one of the church's pioneers Ellen G. White as one of the pillars of Adventist belief. It is a major component of the broader Adventist understanding of the "heavenly sanctuary", and the two are sometimes spoken of interchangeably.

== Summary of the doctrine ==
=== Biblical basis ===
Seventh-day Adventists believe that texts such as Hebrews 8:1–2 teach that the two-compartment design of the earthly sanctuary built by Moses, was in fact a model patterned after the Heavenly Sanctuary "which the Lord set up, not man." Hebrews 8:2 (NASB). They believe that statements in Hebrews 7:17–28 as well as statements found in Hebrews chapters 8 and 9, reveal that Christ entered the first phase of his Heavenly ministry (in the Holy Place of the Heavenly Sanctuary) as the High Priest of humanity after his bodily resurrection and ascension into heaven. According to this view, the 2,300 days found in Daniel 8:13–14 point to the date when Christ's Most Holy Place ministry in Heaven would start. This is the event typified by the Day of Atonement described in Leviticus 16 and in Leviticus 23:26–32. The Investigative Judgment doctrine states that, in 1844, Christ moved from the Holy Place to the Most Holy Place in Heaven as described in Daniel 8:13–14, and that this began the judgment described in Daniel 7:9–10.

The main Biblical texts quoted by Seventh-day Adventists in support of the doctrine of the pre-Advent Judgment being applicable to the professed people of God in all ages, are Daniel 7:9–10; 1 Peter 4:17; and Revelation 14:6, 7; 20:12:

I beheld till the thrones were cast down, and the Ancient of days did sit, whose garment was white as snow, and the hair of his head like the pure wool: his throne was like the fiery flame, and his wheels as burning fire. A fiery stream issued and came forth from before him: thousand thousands ministered unto him, and ten thousand times ten thousand stood before him: the judgment was set, and the books were opened.

— Daniel 7:9, 10 (KJV)

For the time is come that judgment must begin at the house of God: and if it first begin at us, what shall the end be of them that obey not the gospel of God?

— 1 Peter 4:17 (KJV)

And I saw another angel fly in the midst of heaven, having the everlasting gospel to preach unto them that dwell on the earth, and to every nation, and kindred, and tongue, and people, Saying with a loud voice, Fear God, and give glory to him; for the hour of his judgment is come: and worship him that made heaven, and earth, and the sea, and the fountains of waters."

— Revelation 14:6–7 (KJV)

And I saw the dead, small and great, stand before God; and the books were opened: and another book was opened, which is the book of life: and the dead were judged out of those things which were written in the books, according to their works.

— Revelation 20:12 (KJV)

Adventists also believe that the Investigative Judgment is depicted in the parable of the wedding banquet, in Matthew 22:1–14 (KJV). Professing Christians are represented by the wedding guests, and the judgment is represented by the King's inspection of the guests (verses 10, 11). In order to pass the judgment, believers must be wearing the robe of Christ's righteousness, represented by the wedding garments (verses 11, 12).

=== Derivation of 1844 date ===
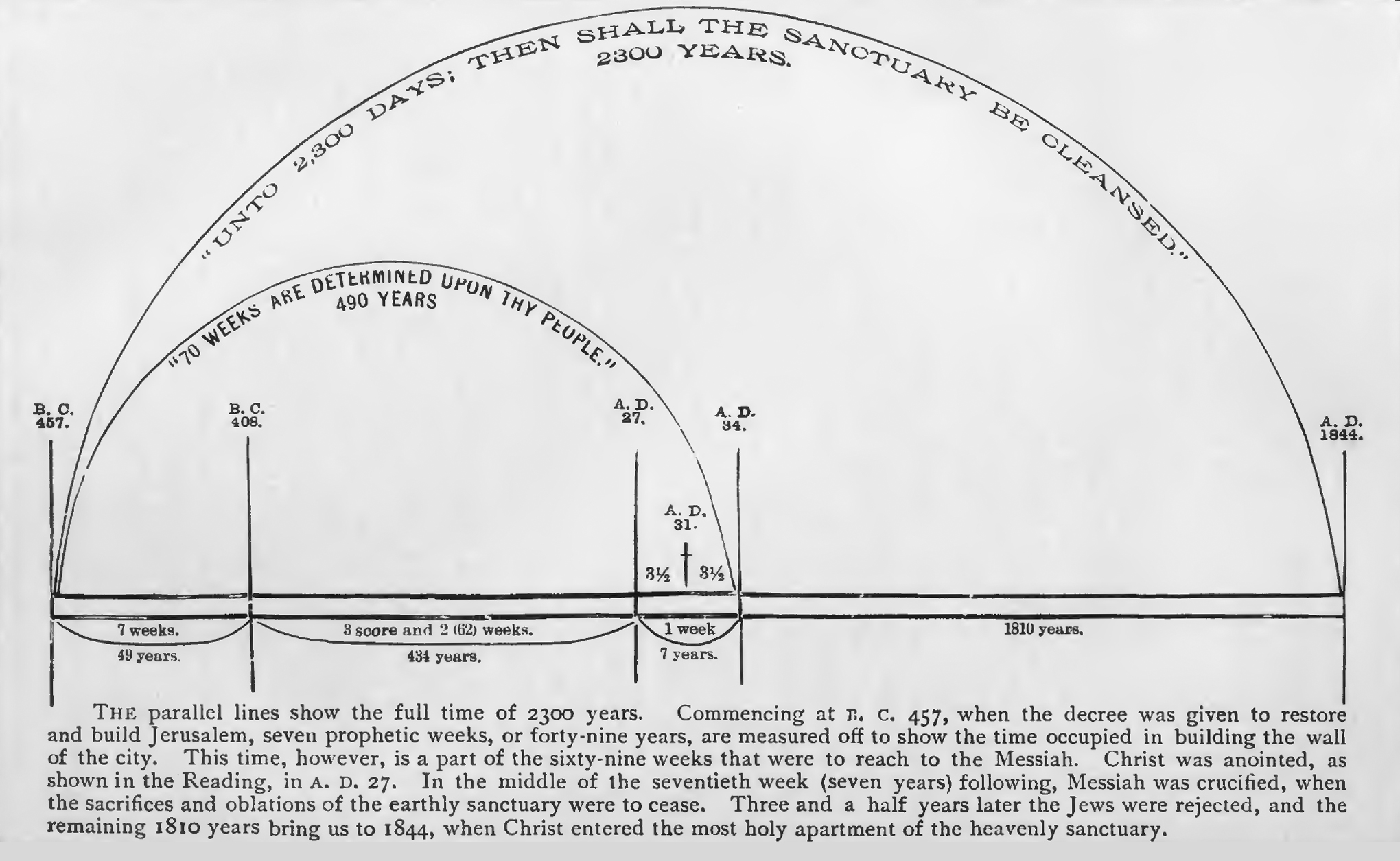
Diagram of the 2300 days in the book Bible Readings for the Home Circle (1888).

The derivation of the 1844 date for the commencement of the pre-Advent Judgment is explained in detail in Adventist publications such as Seventh-day Adventists believe.

- Seventy "week" period (Daniel 9:24–27 (KJV)) is held to begin in 457 BC, the seventh year of Artaxerxes I.
- The "2300 evenings and mornings" period (Daniel 8:13–14 (KJV)) is held to commence in the same year.
- 2300 days are held to correspond to 2300 years (see Day-year principle)
- 457 BC plus 2300 years gives 1844 AD.

While no specific date is given in official belief statements, many Adventists hold October 22, 1844, as the starting date for the pre-Advent Judgment. Originally Miller set the end of the 2300 days between March 21, 1843, and March 21, 1844. In mid-1844, Miller stated "I confess my error, and acknowledge my disappointment: Yet I still believe that the day of the Lord is near." In February 1844, Samuel S. Snow began preaching the end of the 2300 days to be in the fall of 1844. He soon settled on October 22. In an August camp meeting, October 22 took hold of the Adventists in New England. Miller was one of the last to accept the date. W. W. Prescott suggested that the investigative judgment occurred in the spring, and not autumn, but his view was rejected.

=== The judgment process ===
According to Adventist teaching, the works of all men and women are written in "books of record", kept in heaven. During the pre-Advent Judgment, these books are opened (as described in Daniel 7:10 and Revelation 20:12), and the lives of all people both living and dead are examined to establish who has responded to Christ's offer of salvation. "The books of record in heaven, in which the names and the deeds of men are registered, are to determine the decisions of the judgment." "As the books of record are opened in the judgment, the lives of all who have believed on Jesus come in review before God. Beginning with those who first lived upon the earth, our Advocate presents the cases of each successive generation, and closes with the living. Every name is mentioned, every case closely investigated."

The Judgment will show those who are authentic believers in God from those who are not. "All who have truly repented of sin, and by faith claimed the blood of Christ as their atoning sacrifice, have had pardon entered against their names in the books of heaven; as they have become partakers of the righteousness of Christ, and their characters are found to be in harmony with the law of God, their sins will be blotted out, and they themselves will be accounted worthy of eternal life." On the other hand, "When any have sins remaining upon the books of record, unrepented of and unforgiven, their names will be blotted out of the book of life, and the record of their good deeds will be erased from the book of God's remembrance." "Sins that have not been repented of and forsaken will not be pardoned and blotted out of the books of record, but will stand to witness against the sinner in the day of God."

During the judgment, Satan will bring accusations of transgression and unbelief against believers, while Jesus acts as defense. "Jesus will appear as their advocate, to plead in their behalf before God." "While Jesus is pleading for the subjects of His grace, Satan accuses them before God as transgressors." Adventists claim that the good news of the judgment is that Jesus is not only the Attorney, but he is also the Judge (John 5:22). With Jesus as Attorney and Judge, there is nothing to fear.

For a long time, Adventists held the concept that the pre-advent judgment was only concerned with God judging mankind and deciding their eternal destiny. Increasingly the statement is being made that God already "knows who are his," and certainly does not need years to pore over books to inform himself.

However, beginning in the 1950s and on through the 1970s, Edward Heppenstall began teaching that there were bigger issues involved in the pre-advent judgment than just humans. Heppenstall's proteges, Hans LaRondelle, Raoul Dederen and Morris Venden, through the 1970s and 1980s, taught an understanding of the purpose of the pre-advent judgment that includes humans, Satan, the entire universe, and even God himself.

=== Relationship to the Great Controversy ===
The doctrine of the Investigative Judgment is closely linked to the Great Controversy theme, another uniquely Adventist teaching. As the judgment proceeds, angels and "heavenly intelligences" will watch closely. "The deepest interest manifested among men in the decisions of earthly tribunals but faintly represents the interest evinced in the heavenly courts when the names entered in the book of life come up in review before the Judge of all the earth." The result of the judgment, in separating out true from false believers, "vindicates the justice of God in saving those who believe in Jesus" (quoted from the 28 fundamental beliefs). "All [will] come to understand and agree that God is right; that He has no responsibility for the sin problem. His character will emerge unassailable, and His government of love will be reaffirmed."

=== Relationship to the sanctuary doctrine ===
The doctrine of the Investigative Judgment is an integral part of the Seventh-day Adventist doctrine of the sanctuary. As true believers are found righteous in the judgment, their sins are removed or "blotted" from record by the atoning blood of Jesus Christ. This is believed to have been foreshadowed by the work of the High Priest in the Most Holy Place on the Day of Atonement (Leviticus 16). The investigative judgment is the final phase of Christ's atoning work, which began on the cross and continued after his ascension in the Holy Place of the heavenly sanctuary.

=== Relationship to eschatology ===
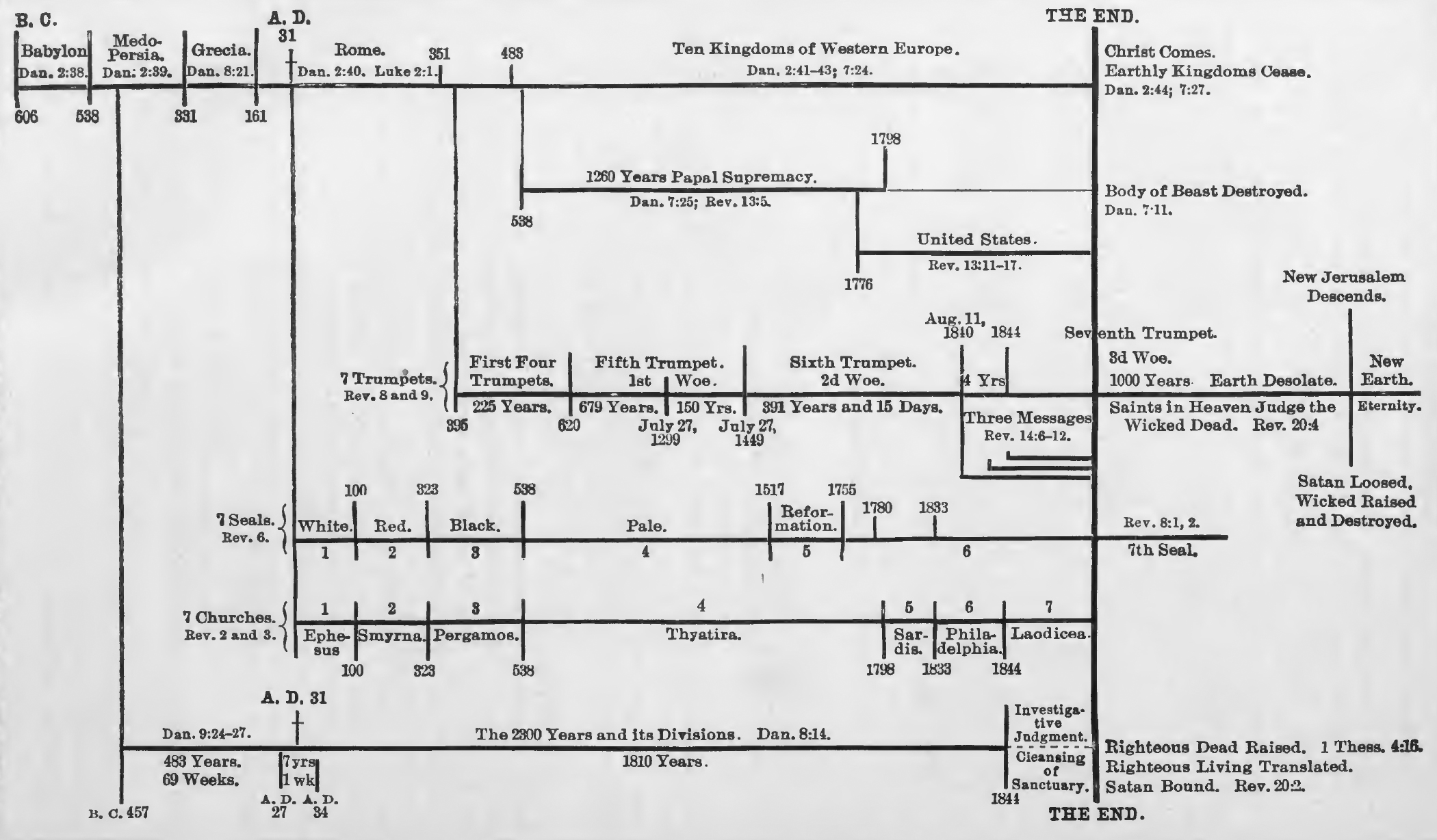
Diagram of Adventist eschatology in the book Bible Readings for the Home Circle (1888).

Although the time of the commencement of the Investigative Judgment is clear (1844), no one can know when it will end. "The work of the investigative judgment and the blotting out of sins is to be accomplished before the second advent of the Lord." However, "silently, unnoticed as the midnight thief, will come the decisive hour which marks the fixing of every man's destiny, the final withdrawal of mercy's offer to guilty men."

The end of the Investigative Judgment is termed "the close of probation" by Seventh-day Adventists. At this point in time, "the destiny of all will have been decided for life or death". There will be no further opportunity for unbelievers to repent and be saved. Revelation 22:11 is considered to describe the close of probation: "Let him who does wrong continue to do wrong; let him who is vile continue to be vile; let him who does right continue to do right; and let him who is holy continue to be holy."

Following the close of probation will be a "time of trouble", which will be a period of intense conflict and persecution for God's people (Revelation 13:15–17; 7:14). Shortly afterward, Christ will return in glory (1 Thessalonians 4:15–17; 2 Thessalonians 1:7–10) and raise the righteous dead (the "first resurrection", Revelation 20:4–5), whom he will take to heaven together with the righteous living to share his millennial reign (Revelation 20:6). Just who these "righteous" are will, of course, have been revealed during the course of the Investigative Judgment. During the millennium, Satan will be imprisoned on earth alone with his demons (Revelation 20:1–3). During this period God's redeemed will be in heaven, having 1000 years to examine the books of Judgment for themselves, ensuring that God has acted fairly in his dealings with humanity. Judgment is committed to those who have walked in human shoes to ensure that the lost have indeed rejected God (Revelation 20:4). At the end of the millennium, Christ will again return to earth with his redeemed to raise the wicked (the "second resurrection", Revelation 20:5). Satan will then deceive the wicked into attacking God's people (Revelation 20:7–9). At this time, Christ will sit down in final Executive Judgment and the books will be open for all (sinner and saved alike) to see and judge (Revelation 20:11–13). Once all have acknowledged the justice and love of God, the execution of the judgment proceeds. Having already thrown Satan and his demonic henchmen into the lake of fire (Revelation 20:10), God now consigns those who have rejected forgiveness to incineration and eternal death (Revelation 20:15). Those who have accepted forgiveness inherit a recreated, perfect, new earth. (Revelation 21:1–5). Adventists feel that their eschatological message is to sound the cry of Revelation 22:17: "The Spirit and the bride say, 'Come.' And let him who hears say, 'Come.' And let him who is thirsty, let him come. And whoever wishes, let him take the free gift of the water of life."

== Official belief statements ==
The doctrine of the Investigative Judgment is outlined in item 24, Christ's Ministry in the Heavenly Sanctuary, of the Seventh-day Adventist fundamental beliefs. In the original Fundamental Beliefs of 1980 it was item 23, but when item 11 was added by the General Conference in 2005 it was changed to item 24.

There is a sanctuary in heaven, the true tabernacle that the Lord set up and not humans. In it Christ ministers on our behalf, making available to believers the benefits of His atoning sacrifice offered once for all on the cross. At His ascension, He was inaugurated as our great High Priest and, began His intercessory ministry, which was typified by the work of the high priest in the holy place of the earthly sanctuary. In 1844, at the end of the prophetic period of 2300 days, He entered the second and last phase of His atoning ministry, which was typified by the work of the high priest in the most holy place of the earthly sanctuary. It is a work of investigative judgment which is part of the ultimate disposition of all sin, typified by the cleansing of the ancient Hebrew sanctuary on the Day of Atonement. In that typical service the sanctuary was cleansed with the blood of animal sacrifices, but the heavenly things are purified with the perfect sacrifice of the blood of Jesus. The investigative judgment reveals to heavenly intelligences who among the dead are asleep in Christ and therefore, in Him, are deemed worthy to have part in the first resurrection. It also makes manifest who among the living are abiding in Christ, keeping the commandments of God and the faith of Jesus, and in Him, therefore, are ready for translation into His everlasting kingdom. This judgment vindicates the justice of God in saving those who believe in Jesus. It declares that those who have remained loyal to God shall receive the kingdom. The completion of this ministry of Christ will mark the close of human probation before the Second Advent. (Lev. 16; Num. 14:34; Ezek. 4:6; Dan. 7:9–27; 8:13, 14; 9:24–27; Heb. 1:3; 2:16, 17; 4:14–16; 8:1–5; 9:11–28; 10:19–22; Rev. 8:3–5; 11:19; 14:6, 7; 20:12; 14:12; 22:11, 12.)

=== Previous statements ===
The doctrine as featured in the earlier published beliefs was often spread across multiple statements. For example, in the beliefs published in 1872 the wording now found in belief 24, titled "Christ's Ministry in the Heavenly Sanctuary", was spread over belief statements 2, 9, 10 and 18 (as designated at that time by Roman numerals).

Fundamental Principles taught and practiced by Seventh-day Adventists, 1872.

– II –

That there is one Lord Jesus Christ, the Son of the Eternal Father, the one by whom God created all things, and by whom they do consist; that he took on him the nature of the seed of Abraham for the redemption of our fallen race; that he dwelt among men full of grace and truth, lived our example, died our sacrifice, was raised for our justification, ascended on high to be our only mediator in the sanctuary in Heaven, where, with his own blood, he makes atonement for our sins; which atonement, so far from being made on the cross, which was but the offering of the sacrifice, is the very last portion of his work as priest, according to the example of the Levitical priesthood, which foreshadowed and prefigured the ministry of our Lord in Heaven. See Leviticus ch. 16, Hebrews 8:4, 5; 9:6, 7; &c.

– IX –

That the mistake of Adventists in 1844 pertained to the nature of the event then to transpire, not to the time; that no prophetic period is given to reach to the second advent, but that the longest one, the two thousand and three hundred days of Daniel 8:14, terminated in that year, and brought us to an event called the cleansing of the sanctuary.

– X –

That the sanctuary of the new covenant is the tabernacle of God in Heaven, of which Paul speaks in Hebrews 8, and onward, of which our Lord, as great High Priest, is minister; that this sanctuary is the antitype of the Mosaic tabernacle, and that the priestly work of our Lord, connected therewith, is the antitype of the work of the Jewish priests of the former dispensation, Hebrews 8:1-5, &c.; that this is the sanctuary to be cleansed at the end of the 2300 days, what is termed its cleansing being in this case, as in the type, simply the entrance of the high priest into the most holy place, to finish the round of service connected therewith, by blotting out and removing from the sanctuary the sins which had been transferred to it by means of the ministration in the first apartment, Hebrews 9:22, 23; and that this work, in the antitype, commencing in 1844, occupies a brief but indefinite space, at the conclusion of which the work of mercy for the world is finished.

– XVIII –

That the time for the cleansing of the sanctuary, synchronizing with the time of the proclamation of the third message, is a time of investigative judgment, first with reference to the dead, and at the close of probation with reference to the living, to determine who of the myriads now sleeping in the dust of the earth are worthy of a part in the first resurrection, and who of its living multitudes are worthy of translation—points which must be determined before the Lord appears.

In the 1931 statement of beliefs, the beliefs comprising the Investigative Judgment doctrine were placed in sequence as statements 13, 14, 15 and 16:

Item 13, Fundamental Beliefs of Seventh-day Adventists, 1931.

That no prophetic period is given in the Bible to reach to the Second Advent, but that the longest one, the 2300 days of Daniel 8:14, terminating in 1844, reaches to an event called the cleansing of the sanctuary (Daniel 8:14; 9:24, 25; Numbers 14:34; Ezekiel 4:6).

Item 14, Fundamental Beliefs of Seventh-day Adventists, 1931.

That the true sanctuary, of which the tabernacle on earth was a type, is the temple of God in heaven, of which Paul speaks in Hebrews 8 and onward, and of which the Lord Jesus, as our great high priest, is minister. The priestly work of our Lord is the antitype of the work of the Jewish priests of the former dispensation. That this heavenly sanctuary is the one to be cleansed at the end of the 2300 days of Daniel 8:14, its cleansing being, as in the type, a work of judgment, beginning with the entrance of Christ as the high priest upon the judgment phase of His ministry in the heavenly sanctuary, foreshadowed in the earthly service of cleansing the sanctuary on the Day of Atonement. This work of judgment in the heavenly sanctuary began in 1844. Its completion will close human probation (Daniel 7:9, 10; 8:14; Hebrews 8:1, 2, 5; Revelation 20:12; Numbers 14:34; Ezekiel 4:6).

Item 15, Fundamental Beliefs of Seventh-day Adventists, 1931.

That God, in the time of the judgment and in accordance with His uniform dealing with the human family in warning them of coming events vitally affecting their destiny (Amos 3:6, 7), sends forth a proclamation of the approach of the Second Advent of Christ; that this work is symbolized by the three angels of Revelation 14, and that their threefold message brings to view a work of reform to prepare a people to meet Him at His coming (Amos 3:6, 7; 2 Corinthians 5:10; Revelation 14:6–12).

Item 16, Fundamental Beliefs of Seventh-day Adventists, 1931.

That the time of the cleansing of the sanctuary, synchronizing with the period of the proclamation of the message of Revelation 14, is a time of investigative judgment, first, with reference to the dead, and second, with reference to the living. This investigative judgment determines who of the myriads sleeping in the dust of the earth are worthy of a part in the first resurrection, and who of its living multitudes are worthy of translation (1 Peter 4:17, 18; Daniel 7:9, 10; Revelation 14:6, 7; Luke 20:35).

Every five years the Adventist World Church meets in session to review current issues, add doctrinal statements and clarify church positions. Although a significant restatement of the published beliefs took place in 1980 General Conference session, the church has chosen to leave the doctrinal statement on the Investigative judgment virtually unchanged from its formulation in the 1870s.

=== Other statements and significant publications ===
The constitution of the Adventist Theological Society affirms the doctrine of the Investigative Judgment.

e. The Society affirms a real sanctuary in heaven and the pre-advent judgment of believers beginning in 1844, based upon the historicist view of prophecy and the year-day principle as taught in Scripture.

Official Adventist publications such as Seventh-day Adventists Answer Questions on Doctrine (1957) and Seventh-day Adventists believe (1988) defend the church's traditional teaching.

Documents publicly available on the Biblical Research Institute's website support and defend the traditional doctrine with reference to Scripture.

The 2006 third quarter Adult Bible Study Guide produced by the Seventh-day Adventist General Conference, was entitled The Gospel, 1844, and Judgment, and strongly upholds and defends the church's traditional 1844 doctrine. The preface to the study guide states that "From this doctrine, perhaps more than any other, our distinct identity as Seventh-day Adventists arises."

== History ==
The emphasis of this belief has evolved over time, but the basis is the same. The year 1844 is believed to be the time Christ commenced a new phase of ministry in the Most Holy Place of the heavenly sanctuary, symbolised by the Day of Atonement ceremony described in Leviticus 16. In the years immediately after World War II, Adventism tended to view the judgment in stern tones and the teaching has increasingly been understood as God on the side of people.

Smuts van Rooyen describes a "string of changing interpretations we have given this prophecy from Second Coming, to Shut Door, to Investigative Judgment, to cleansing the Living Temple, to Vindication of God's Character, to simple Pre-advent Judgment..."

=== Origins ===
William Miller and his followers, the Millerite Adventist movement, consisted of a group of about 50,000 believers expecting Jesus Christ to return to earth on October 22, 1844. They arrived at this date from an interpretation of the Bible verse Daniel 8:14. They understood the 2300 days to represent 2300 years (according to the day-year principle of prophetic interpretation), a time period stretching from the biblical era to the nineteenth century. However, Miller had not been the first to arrive at this interpretation, as he himself emphasized. Others had earlier concluded that a prophetic period of 2300 years was to end "around the year 1843" (Miller's earlier estimate).

When Jesus did not return as expected (an event which Adventists call the "Great Disappointment"), several alternative interpretations of the prophecy were put forward. The majority of Millerites abandoned the 1844 date; however, about 50 members out of the larger group of 50,000 (including Hiram Edson and O. R. L. Crosier) concluded, after Hiram Edson claimed to have had a vision as he crossed a cornfield on the morning after the Great Disappointment, that the event predicted by Daniel 8:14 was not the second coming, but rather Christ's entrance into the Most Holy Place of the heavenly sanctuary. Hiram Edson's revelation led to a series of Bible studies with other Millerites to confirm the validity of his solution.

Edson's vision became the foundation for the Adventist doctrine of the sanctuary, and the people who held it became the nucleus of what would emerge from other "Adventist" groups as the Seventh-day Adventist Church. The revelation was greatly encouraging for the [Seventh-day] Adventists. As Ellen White wrote later, "The scripture which above all others had been both the foundation and the central pillar of the advent faith, was the declaration, 'Unto two thousand and three hundred days; then shall the sanctuary be cleansed'" (quoting Daniel 8:14). She also predicted that criticism of the belief would come.

James White, Crosier, and also Uriah Smith supported the belief. Some critics accused Ellen White of plagiarising from Uriah Smith and other authors on this subject. Those claims were refuted by James White as late as 1851.

The Millerites initially held that although the second coming of Christ had not occurred on October 22, the "close of probation" had occurred on that day. They based this belief on their understanding of the parable of the 10 virgins found in Matthew 25 in which the door of salvation is shut. They believed it was too late to be saved if one had not been through the Millerite experience, while they still anxiously expected that Jesus would return to Earth within their lifetimes. However they shortly began to experience that some of the people they were communicating with were accepting Christ and being converted. The interpretation of Christ's ministry of sanctuary cleansing gave them a theological framework by which to process this. This "shut-door" belief was linked to the sanctuary doctrine. The shut-door aspect was abandoned by the early 1850s.

Robert W. Olson wrote in a formative 1982 document whilst White Estate director:

While the term "shut door" at first was used to indicate probation's close in 1844, it soon came to mean the close of Christ's ministry in the first apartment of the heavenly sanctuary. It stood for a change of Christ's ministry in heaven on October 22, 1844.

Over time, Adventists came to believe that the "cleansing" of the heavenly sanctuary involves a work of judgment as depicted in the courtroom scene of Daniel 7:9–13 immediately prior to the second coming of Christ described in Daniel 7:14. In the 1850s, J. N. Loughborough and Uriah Smith began to teach that a judgment had begun in 1844 when Christ entered the Most Holy Place. Subsequently, in 1857, James White (husband of Ellen G. White) wrote in the Review and Herald (now the Adventist Review) that an "investigative judgment" was taking place in heaven, in which the lives of professed believers would pass in review before God. This is the first time that the phrase "investigative judgment" was used.

The doctrine of the Investigative Judgment was given its most thorough exposition in chapter 28—Facing Life's Record of The Great Controversy by Ellen G. White.

=== Desmond Ford ===
Australian Desmond Ford was a theologian in the church. In 1979 he addressed an Adventist Forums meeting at Pacific Union College critiquing the doctrine. This was viewed with concern and he was given leave to write up his views. In August 1980 the "Sanctuary Review Committee" met at Glacier View Ranch in Colorado to discuss Ford's views. Ford had written nearly 1000-pages titled Daniel 8:14, the Day of Atonement and the Investigative Judgement.

The Glacier View meeting produced two consensus statements and formulated a ten-point summary that highlighted major points of difference between Ford's positions and traditional Adventist teaching. Ultimately, the church's administration took action against Ford, revoking his ministerial credentials one month after Glacier View. Special issues of Ministry and Spectrum covered the event. A number of ministers resigned in the wake of Glacier View because they supported Ford's theology. By one count, 182 pastors in Australia and New Zealand left between 1980 and 1988, equivalent to "an astonishing 40 percent of the total ministerial workforce" in those countries. This amounts to "the most rapid and massive exit of Adventist pastors in the movement's 150-year history" (although he cautions that the fallout may have involved more than one factor). Cottrell believes Ford has given more scholarly study to the belief and written more on it than any other person in history. Ford subsequently formed the independent ministry Good News Unlimited and criticized many of the related church beliefs.

=== Subsequent history ===
Following Glacier View, the church formed an 18-member committee called the "Daniel and Revelation Study Committee" under the Biblical Research Institute, in order to study and re-evaluate the traditional Adventist understanding of the investigative judgment. This committee has produced the seven-volume Daniel and Revelation Committee Series, with main contributing authors William H. Shea and Frank B. Holbrook. Five of these seven volumes cover the biblical Book of Daniel, and two cover the Book of Revelation.

Ford has claimed that a number of "key figures" privately agreed with his views about the investigative judgment but refrained from speaking publicly on the issue, fearing that these "key figures" might lose their employment. Arthur Patrick saw Glacier View as a milestone in the theological development of the church, and that the effects of this controversy continue to be felt today.

Morris Venden's portrayal of the investigative judgment emphasizes the fairness of God as a judge, as well as the grace of God.

Recent critics include Dale Ratzlaff, who left the church following the Ford crisis, and former lecturer Jerry Gladson.

== Criticism of the doctrine ==
There has been criticism by non-Adventist theologians, and some progressive Adventists disagree with the doctrine of the investigative judgment as it is traditionally taught by the church.

Criticism has been leveled at the doctrine at the following points:

Lack of biblical basis
Some have claimed that the doctrine has very little scriptural support for it or that it is based on the King James Version of the Bible rather than current translations, or is based almost exclusively on the writings of Ellen G. White. Miller used an English Bible concordance, and found word parallels in English when sometimes the original language was different. It has been criticized for relying on the "prooftext" method, in which disparate Bible verses are linked but sometimes out of context.
Questionable origins
Critics have drawn attention to the fact that the sanctuary doctrine did not initially arise from biblical exegesis, but as a response to William Miller’s 1844 mistake. Donald Barnhouse denounced the doctrine as "the most colossal, psychological, face-saving phenomenon in religious history". Likewise, religion scholar Anthony Hoekema stated that the doctrine was "simply a way out of an embarrassing predicament" and therefore "a doctrine built on a mistake". It has been pointed out that the doctrine was rejected by Miller himself.
Unusual interpretation of prophecy
The 1844 date is based on an interpretation of a biblical verse (Daniel 8:14) that is exclusive to the Millerite/Adventist movement. According to modern Preterist commentators, Daniel 8:14 refers to 2300 evening and morning sacrifices, and therefore covers a period of 1,150 days (or 3.5 years); it refers to the desecration of the temple by Antiochus Epiphanes which began in 167 BC and ended 3.5 years later when the Maccabees regained control of the temple and reinstituted their services.
Different view of the Atonement
Protestant Christianity has traditionally taught that Jesus Christ performed his work of atonement on the Cross, and that his sacrificial death brought to fulfillment the entire Old Testament sacrificial system, including the Day of Atonement. The idea that the Day of Atonement does not meet its antitype until 18 centuries after Jesus' crucifixion is a deviation from historic Christian theology.
Lack of support from Christian tradition
No church besides the Seventh-day Adventist denomination teaches this doctrine. It is difficult to see how such a significant doctrine could be so widely overlooked.
Faith vs. works
The doctrine of the Investigative Judgment seems to give works an undue place in salvation. On a strict reading of Ellen G. White, a Christian might be disqualified from salvation by failing to repent of every single sin. This seems to contradict the Reformation understanding of "salvation by grace through faith alone".
Passage of time
Although the original exponents of the doctrine expected the investigative judgment to be a very brief period, about 170 years have now passed since the year 1844. The ever-increasing span of time between 1844 and the second coming casts significant doubt on the validity of the belief.
The Hebrew Calendar
Rabbi Loschak affirms that, "It is impossible for Yom Kippur to occur that late in the month of October (October 22) no matter what alleged change (to the Jewish calendar) there may have been. Simply put the Torah tells us that the first month of the Jewish year is the month of Passover which must occur in the Spring, and the latest secular date it can start is about April 19. Yom Kippur is always 173 days after this date, and that would be October 9. There is no way it could work out to be October 22."
All Hebrew calendars universally agree that Yom Kippur (which is the 10th day of Tishrei), in the year 1844 A.D. (Hebrew year 5605) actually occurred on September 23.
Lack of confidence within Adventism
Raymond F. Cottrell, claimed that the investigative judgment doctrine lacks support within Adventist academia and points to the "Committee on Problems in the book of Daniel", convened in the 1960s, which failed to produce any conclusions despite 5 years of labour. However, see the 7 volumes produced by the Biblical Research Institute on Daniel & Revelation.
According to Cottrell, "In the years immediately following October 22, 1844 the traditional sanctuary doctrine was an important asset for stabilizing the faith of disappointed Adventists. Today it is an equally significant liability and deterrent to the faith, confidence, and salvation of biblically literate Adventists and non-Adventists alike. It was present truth following the great disappointment on October 22, 1844. It is not present truth in the year of our Lord 2002. Quod erat demonstrandum!"
Cottrell also claimed that disciplining of ordained ministers due to theology was inconsistent – that one may believe Christ was a created being, legalism or works-oriented salvation, or the non-literalness of the Genesis creation account without losing their credentials; yet lists many who have lost their jobs regarding the investigative judgment.
Lack of pastoral relevance
Individuals such as Desmond Ford and John McLarty have said that in practice, the investigative judgment is not preached in churches. McLarty claims that the doctrine "is not helpful in providing spiritual care for real people in the real world".

=== Response from other Christian churches ===
Non-Adventist Christian churches and theologians have found that the investigative judgment is a doctrine with which they cannot agree. In a discussion between Adventist leaders and representatives from the World Evangelical Alliance in August 2007, the investigative judgment was noted as one of three points of doctrinal disagreement (the other two being the Sabbath and the authoritative role of Ellen G. White).

=== Adventist response to critics ===
Lack of biblical basis
According to Adventist apologists this criticism is no longer valid because Adventist scholars have produced an extensive treatment of the doctrine purely on the basis of Scripture alone. However, some Adventist scholars still debate its validity.
Atonement not complete at the cross
According to Adventist apologists this criticism is not entirely valid. The Adventist publication "The 27 Fundamental Beliefs" (pages 110–111) affirms that Christ's atoning sacrifice was completed at the cross; so also does the book Questions on Doctrine (page 375), which affirms the Adventist belief that the death of Christ as mankind's atoning sacrifice was completed once for all. However, Adventists embrace the broad view of the Leviticus 16 "Day of Atonement" model, where the scope for the term "Atonement" involves not only the sacrifice of the sin offering (Christ's completed atoning sacrifice) – but also the work of the High Priest in the Sanctuary. Many Protestant and Catholic scholars, including some early church fathers, have noted the high priestly ministry of Christ in heaven on the basis of the book of Hebrews. The Adventist link with atonement derives from their Wesleyan-Arminian roots by extending the Wesleyan-Lutheran understanding of the atonement to include the high priestly ministry. Thus, Adventists use the term "atonement" more broadly than the traditional theology. W. G. C. Murdock, former dean of the SDA theological seminary, stated, "Seventh-day Adventists have always believed in a complete atonement that is not completed." The sacrifice of Jesus was indeed complete at the cross; however, in Adventist belief his sacrifice has not yet completed repairing broken relationships caused by sin, which will only occur after the end of the world.

Salvation by works
Seventh-day Adventists do not believe in salvation by works. Adventist doctrine states that salvation is by faith alone, but they note that faith without works is dead as we find in James 2. In the Gospel of John (John 14:15), Jesus said "If you love me, keep my commandments." Only those who have been born again and walk in the Spirit (Romans 8:4) could ever love Jesus. Adventists point out that under the New Covenant (as listed in Hebrews chapter 8) the saints receive the Law of God written on the heart and mind, so for the saints keeping his commands is "not burdensome" (1 John 5:3). Adventists insist that Christ's command to "keep My Commandments" was not given as a means of salvation, rather, keeping his commands is the fruit of a changed life. As Christ states in John 15 obedience is the result of love. In the Adventist view of sanctification, works of obedience come about as a result of love that is born of faith in the Savior.
Passage of time since 1844
Adventists counter this criticism by noting that Christ's Holy Place ministry in heaven lasted for 1800 years and that during his Most Holy Place ministry in heaven the door of salvation remains open to all who seek him. The close of probation for mankind does not come before the fulfillment of certain eschatological prophecies predicted in the Book of Revelation and still future to human history. Judgment continues in heaven as long as there are individuals that accept salvation until the close of probation.
Adventists reject Calvinistic predestination. Such a decision makes judgment a necessary part of the divine plan of salvation (Wesleyan–Arminian concept). Adventists use the term "atonement" in harmony with the "Day of Atonement" service found in Leviticus 16. That service includes both the death of the sin offering, and the ministry of the high priest in the sanctuary before the full scope of atonement is completed. Many Christians today limit their concept of atonement to the point where the sin offering has been made and is completed. This difference in the way the term is defined by the various groups within Christendom has been a source of some undue criticism.

== See also ==
- Daniel's 70 Weeks prophecy
- Seventh-day Adventist eschatology
- 28 fundamental beliefs
- Teachings of Ellen White#End times
- Inspiration of Ellen White
- List of Ellen White writings
- Ellen G. White Estate
- Prophecy in the Seventh-day Adventist Church
- Premillennialism

== Bibliography ==
- Ballis, Peter H. (1999), Leaving the Adventist Ministry: A Study of the Process of Exiting, Praeger.
- Ford, Desmond, Daniel 8:14, the Day of Atonement, and the Investigative Judgment.
- Goldstein, Clifford, 1844 Made Simple, Pacific Press.
- Goldstein, Clifford (2003), Graffiti in the Holy of Holies, Pacific Press. An update of his earlier, more passionated book.
  - "Fireworks in the Holy of Holies" (RTF), Spectrum (review), 33 (1): 67–72, Winter 2005.
  - Taylor, Ervin (28 September 2006), "Clifford Goldstein's Graffiti in the Holy of Holies" (review), Adventist Today.
- Tarling, Lowell R. (1981). "The Sanctuary". The Edges of Seventh-day Adventism: A Study of Separatist Groups Emerging from the Seventh-day Adventist Church (1844–1980). Barragga Bay, Bermagui South, NSW: Galilee Publications. pp. 171–185. ISBN 0-9593457-0-1.
- Schwarz, Richard W; Greenleaf, Floyd (2000) [1979]. Light Bearers (Revised ed.). Silver Spring, Maryland: General Conference of Seventh-day Adventists, Department of Education. ISBN 0-8163-1795-X.
- Roy Adams, The Sanctuary Doctrine: Three Approaches in the Seventh-day Adventist Church (Berrien Springs, Michigan: Andrews University Seminary Doctoral Dissertation Series, Andrews University Press, 1981). See also "After the Cross", Adventist World October 2008; "The Pre-Advent Judgment", Adventist World August 2007
- Gary Land, Historical Dictionary of Seventh-day Adventists, bibliography pp. 347–348
- White, Ellen G (1888), The Great Controversy.
