= Hiram Edson =

American Seventh-day Adventist leader

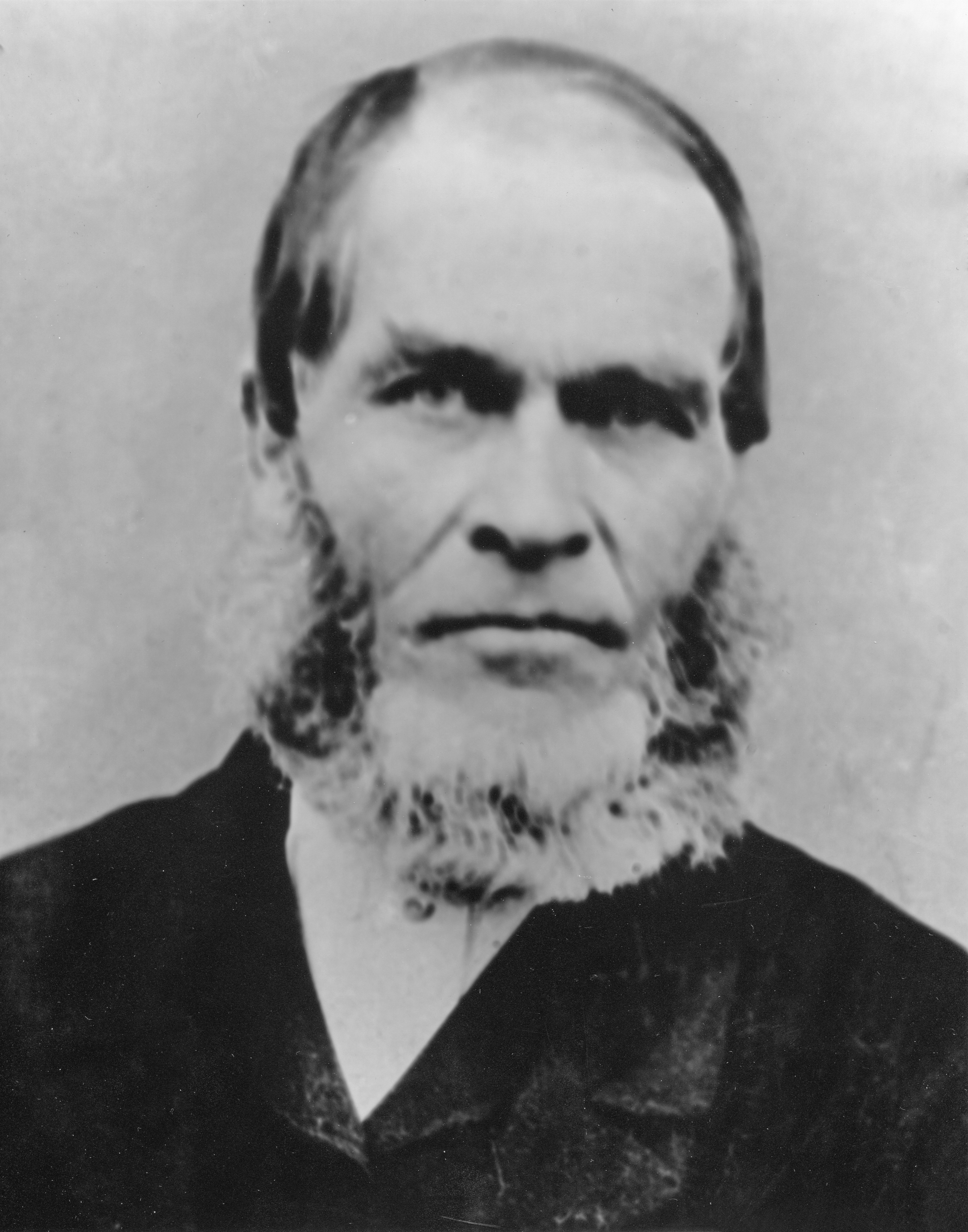

Personal details
- Born: Hiram Edson; December 30, 1806 Jefferson County, New York
- Died: January 8, 1882 (aged 75) East Palermo
- Spouse: 1830: Effa Chrisler (died May, 1839); 1839: Esther Persons
- Children: George, Susan, Belinda, Viah Ophelia, Viah Ophelia, Lucy Jane
- Occupation: Pioneer of the Seventh-day Adventist Church

Hiram Edson (1806–1882) was a pioneer of the Seventh-day Adventist Church, known for introducing the sanctuary doctrine (investigative judgment) to the church. Hiram Edson was a Millerite adventist, and became a Sabbath-keeping Adventist. Like all Millerites, Edson expected that the Second Coming of Jesus Christ would occur on October 22, 1844. This belief was based on an interpretation of the 2300 day prophecy which predicted that "the sanctuary would be cleansed" which Millerites took to mean that Christ would return on that day.

== Early life ==
Hiram Edson, was a prosperous farmer of Ontario County, N.Y.. Edson's first wife, Effa Chrisler, died in 1839, leaving him to care for three children. He soon remarried in Port Gibson, New York. At the time, Edson was a steward of the Methodist church who had embraced the Millerite expectation of the Advent in the spring of 1843. His home in Port Gibson soon became a home church for the believers of the region.

== Involvement with the Millerites ==
The Millerite message came to Rochester, New York, in 1843 and soon spread to Port Gibson. The message was based on the preaching of William Miller and predicted that Christ would return about the year 1843, which was later refined to October 22, 1844. This belief was based on the day-year principle and an interpretation of the 2300 days mentioned in Daniel 8:14 which predicted that "the sanctuary would be cleansed". The Millerites understood this verse to point to Christ's return to "cleanse" the earth.

Edson, a Methodist, heard and accepted the message at an evangelistic series. On the last day of the series, Edson was impressed to visit a dying neighbor and ask for his healing in the name of the Lord. He visited the neighbor's home late that night and layed his hands on him. It is said that the neighbor immediately threw off the blankets, got out of bed, and began praising God for his healing. Soon the whole household was doing the same.

That same night Edson believed that the Lord told him to begin preaching the Advent message to his friends and neighbors. He struggled with the thought for days, finding this more difficult to do even than healing the sick. He finally acted on his belief and soon three or four hundred of his neighbors accepted the Advent message as well.

== The Great Disappointment ==
Edson spent October 22, 1844 with friends waiting for the event, and was heart-broken when Jesus did not return as expected. He later wrote,

"Our fondest hopes and expectations were blasted, and such a spirit of weeping came over us as I never experienced before. It seemed that the loss of all earthly friends could have been no comparison. We wept, and wept, till the day dawn."

As the hours passed, Edson reflected on the events of the previous year. He believed he had been given the power to heal the sick, and he had seen many hundreds of friends turn to Jesus as a result of his preaching. His confidence soon returned, and he suggested that he and some friends visit some nearby Adventists (or Millerites) to encourage them. On the morning of October 23, 1844 they walked through Edson's cornfield to avoid the mocking jeers of the neighbors who had refused to believe the Advent message. It was in this cornfield that Edson claimed to have received an insight from God. Accordingly, Edson came to understand that "the cleansing of the sanctuary" meant that Jesus was moving from the Holy Place to the Most Holy Place in the heavenly sanctuary, and not to the Second Coming of Jesus to earth:

"We started, and while passing through a large field I was stopped about midway of the field. Heaven seemed opened to my view, and I saw distinctly and clearly that instead of our High Priest coming out of the Most Holy of the heavenly sanctuary to come to this earth on the tenth day of the seventh month, at the end of the 2300 days, He for the first time entered on that day the second apartment of that sanctuary; and that He had a work to perform in the Most Holy Place before coming to the earth."

Edson shared his new understanding with many of the local Adventists who were greatly encouraged by his account. As a result, Edson began studying the Bible with two of the other believers in the area, O. R. L. Crosier and Franklin B. Hahn, who published their findings in a paper called the Day-Dawn. This paper explored the biblical parable of the Ten Virgins, which describes a group of women waiting at a wedding for the bridegroom to arrive. The bridegroom, who was thought to symbolise Christ, was delayed, of which the men saw a parallel in their own situation. They attempted to explain why the "bridegroom" had tarried. The article also explored the concept of the day of atonement and what the authors called "our chronology of events".

The findings published by Crosier, Hahn and Edson led to a new understanding about the sanctuary in heaven. Their paper explained how there was a sanctuary in heaven, that Christ, the heavenly High Priest, was to cleanse. The believers understood this cleansing to be what the 2300 days in Daniel was referring to. This distinctive Seventh-day Adventist belief is now known as the investigative judgment. Crosier's published account of Edson's vision came into the possession of James White (husband of Ellen G. White) and Joseph Bates, the latter of whom visited Edson in New York and converted him to the seventh-day Sabbath.

== Later life ==
At the close of a revival in 1855, Edson was ordained as a local church elder. For many years after the "Great Disappointment" when Jesus did not come as expected, he continued as a lay preacher, working with Joseph Bates, J. N. Andrews, and J. N. Loughborough. He continued to farm in the summer to pay his expenses. In 1850 Edson sold his Port Gibson farm to help support the Sabbatarian movement, and sold a second farm two years later in Port Byron, NY so that James White could purchase a printing press in Rochester. The Sabbatarian Adventist movement was formally organized as the Seventh-day Adventist Church in 1863. Edson was credentialed as a minister in 1870.

== See also ==
- Seventh-day Adventist Church
- Seventh-day Adventist theology
- Seventh-day Adventist eschatology
- Millerites
- William Miller (preacher)
- History of the Seventh-day Adventist Church
- 28 fundamental beliefs
- Questions on Doctrine
- Teachings of Ellen White
- Inspiration of Ellen White
- Prophecy in the Seventh-day Adventist Church
- Investigative judgment
- The Pillars of Adventism
- Second Advent
- Baptism by Immersion
- Conditional Immortality
- Historicism
- Three Angels' Messages
- End times
- Sabbath in Seventh-day Adventism
- Ellen G. White
- Adventist Review
- Adventist
- Seventh-day Adventist Church Pioneers
- Seventh-day Adventist worship
- Heavenly sanctuary
