= Holy of Holies =

Inner sanctuary of the Jewish Tabernacle

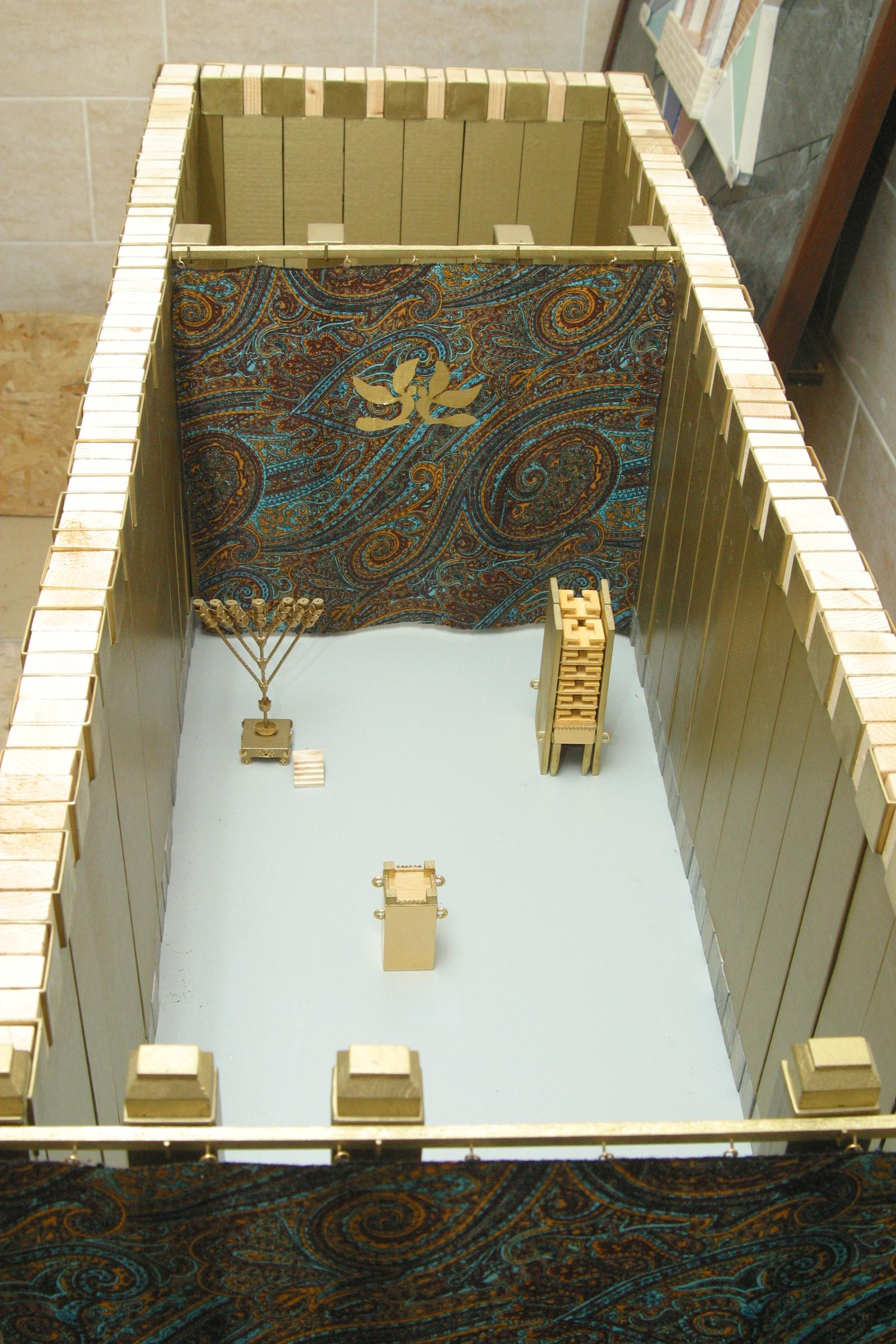
A model of the Tabernacle showing the holy place, and behind it the Holy of Holies

The Holy of Holies (Biblical Hebrew: קֹדֶשׁ הַקֳּדָשִׁים, romanized: Qoḏeš haq-Qŏḏāšim) or Devir (הַדְּבִיר had-Dəḇir 'the Sanctuary') is a term in the Hebrew Bible that refers to the inner sanctuary of the Tabernacle, where the Shekhinah (God's presence) appeared. According to Hebrew tradition, the area was defined by four pillars that held up the veil of the covering, under which the Ark of the Covenant was held above the floor. According to the Hebrew Bible, the Ark contained the Ten Commandments, which were given by God to Moses on Mount Sinai. The first Temple in Jerusalem, called Solomon's Temple, was said to have been built by King Solomon to keep the Ark.

Jewish traditions viewed the Holy of Holies as the spiritual junction of the Seven Heavens and Earth, the "axis mundi".

As a part of the Temple in Jerusalem, the Holy of Holies was situated somewhere on Temple Mount; its precise location is a matter of dispute, with some classical Jewish sources identifying its location with the Foundation Stone, which sits under the current Dome of the Rock. Other Jewish scholars argue that contemporary reports would place the Temple to the north or east of the Dome of the Rock.

The Crusaders associated the Holy of Holies with the Well of Souls, a small cave that lies underneath the Foundation Stone in the Dome of the Rock.

== Hebrew terminology and translation ==
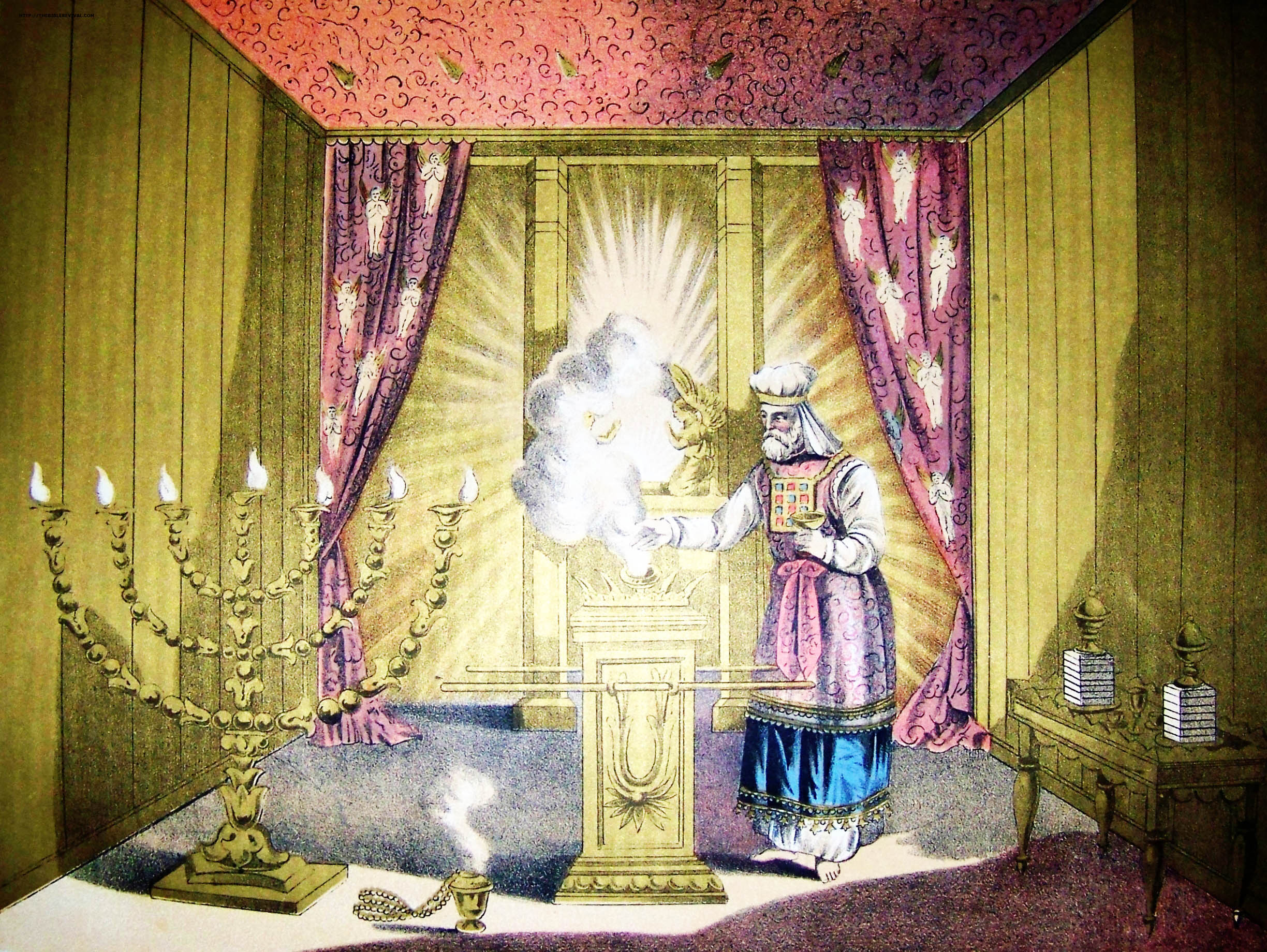
Depiction of a High Priest of Israel wearing the priestly breastplate and ephod, included as an illustration in a Christian Bible; the Holy of Holies is in the background (A. J. Holman Bible, 1890).

The construction "Holy of Holies" is a translation of the Hebrew, which is intended to express a superlative. Examples of similar constructions are "servant of servants" (Gen 9:25), "sabbath of sabbaths" (Ex 31:15), "God of gods" (Deut 10:17), "vanity of vanities" (Eccl 1:2), "Song of Songs" (Song of Songs 1:1), "king of kings" (Ezra 7:12), etc.

The translators of the King James Version of the Christian Bible always translated "Holy of Holies" as "Most Holy Place" – in keeping with the intention of the Hebrew idiom to express the utmost degree of holiness. Thus, the name "Most Holy Place" was used to refer to the "Holy of Holies" in many English documents.

A related term, debir, transliterated in the Septuagint (Koine Greek: δαβιρ, romanized: dabir), either means the back (i.e. western) part of the Sanctuary, or else derives from the verb stem ד־ב־ר "to speak", justifying the translation in the Vulgate as oraculum, which the traditional English translation "oracle" (KJV, 1611) derives from.

The Latin terms adytum and penetralia parallel the designation of the Holy of Holies as an inner sanctuary.

== Ancient Israel ==
=== Tabernacle ===
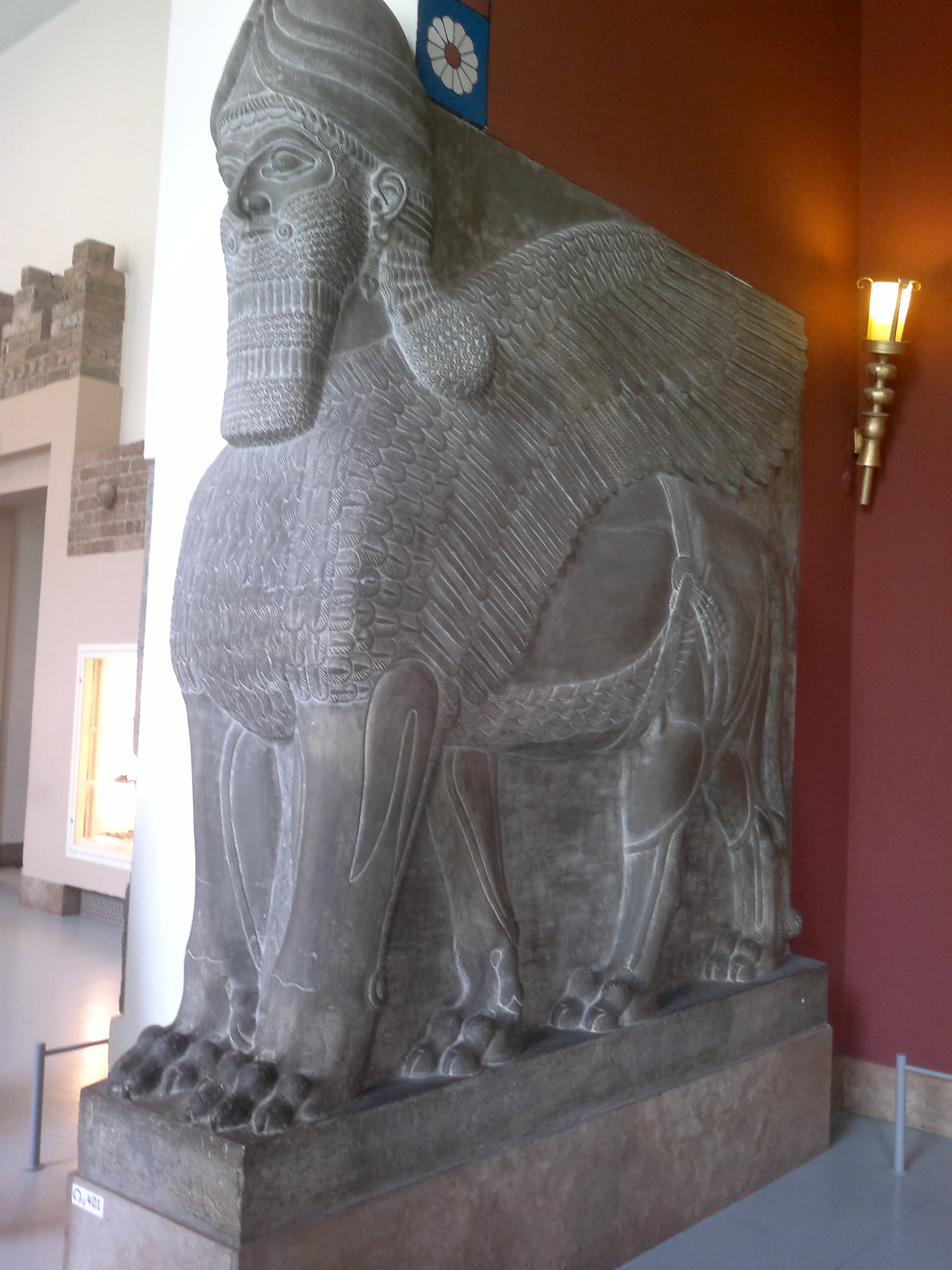
This replica of one of a pair of door-guardian lamassu illustrates the hybrid form of the twin cherubim of the Ark

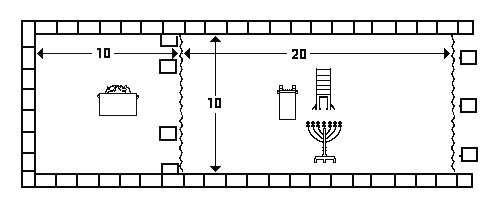
Layout of the tabernacle with the holy and holy of holies

According to the Hebrew Bible, so that Yahweh might dwell among the Israelites, he gave Moses instructions for erecting a sanctuary. The directions provide for:

1. The Ark of the Covenant, wood with gilded inside and outside, for the Tablets of Stone, with a pure gold cover as the "mercy seat" for the Shekhinah;
2. A gilt table for the showbread, on which loaves of bread were arranged;
3. A golden Temple menorah, a lampstand of seven oil lamps for a light never to be extinguished;
4. The dwelling, including the curtains for the roof, the walls made of boards resting on silver feet and held together by wooden bolts; the parochet, a multi-colored curtain veiling the Holy of Holies colored blue, purple, crimson, white and gold; the table and candlestick; and the outer curtain
5. A sacrificial altar made of bronzed boards for the korban (sacrifice)
6. The outer court formed by columns resting on bronze pedestals and connected by hooks and crossbars of silver, with embroidered curtains;
7. Recipe and preparation of the fresh olive oil for the lampstand.

According to Exodus 26:31–33, the parochet covered the Holy of Holies and no one was allowed to enter except the High Priest of Israel. Even he would only enter once a year, on Yom Kippur, to offer the blood of sacrifice and incense. In the wilderness, on the day that the Tabernacle was first raised, the cloud of the Lord covered the tabernacle according to Exodus 40:33-34. There are other times that this was recorded. Instructions were given that the Lord would appear in the cloud upon the Mercy Seat, and at that time the priests should not enter into the tabernacle according to Leviticus 16:2. The Holy of Holies contained the Ark of the Covenant with a representation of cherubim.

Upon completion of the dedication of the Tabernacle, the Voice of God spoke to Moses "from between the Cherubim" in Numbers 7:89.

=== Solomon's Temple ===
The Holy of Holies was the inner sanctuary within the Tabernacle and Temple in Jerusalem when Solomon's Temple and the Second Temple were standing. The parochet, a brocade curtain with cherubim motifs woven directly into the fabric from the loom, divided the Holy of Holies from the lesser Holy place.

The Holy of Holies was located at the westernmost end of the Temple building and was a cube: 20 cubits by 20 cubits by 20 cubits. The inside was in darkness and contained the Ark of the Covenant, gilded inside and out, in which was placed the Tablets of Stone. According to both Jewish and Christian traditions, Aaron's rod and a pot of manna were also in the ark. The Ark was covered with a lid made of pure gold, known as the "mercy seat" (Exodus 37:6), which was covered by the beaten gold cherubim wings, creating the space for the Shekhinah (Exodus 25:22).

=== Second Temple ===
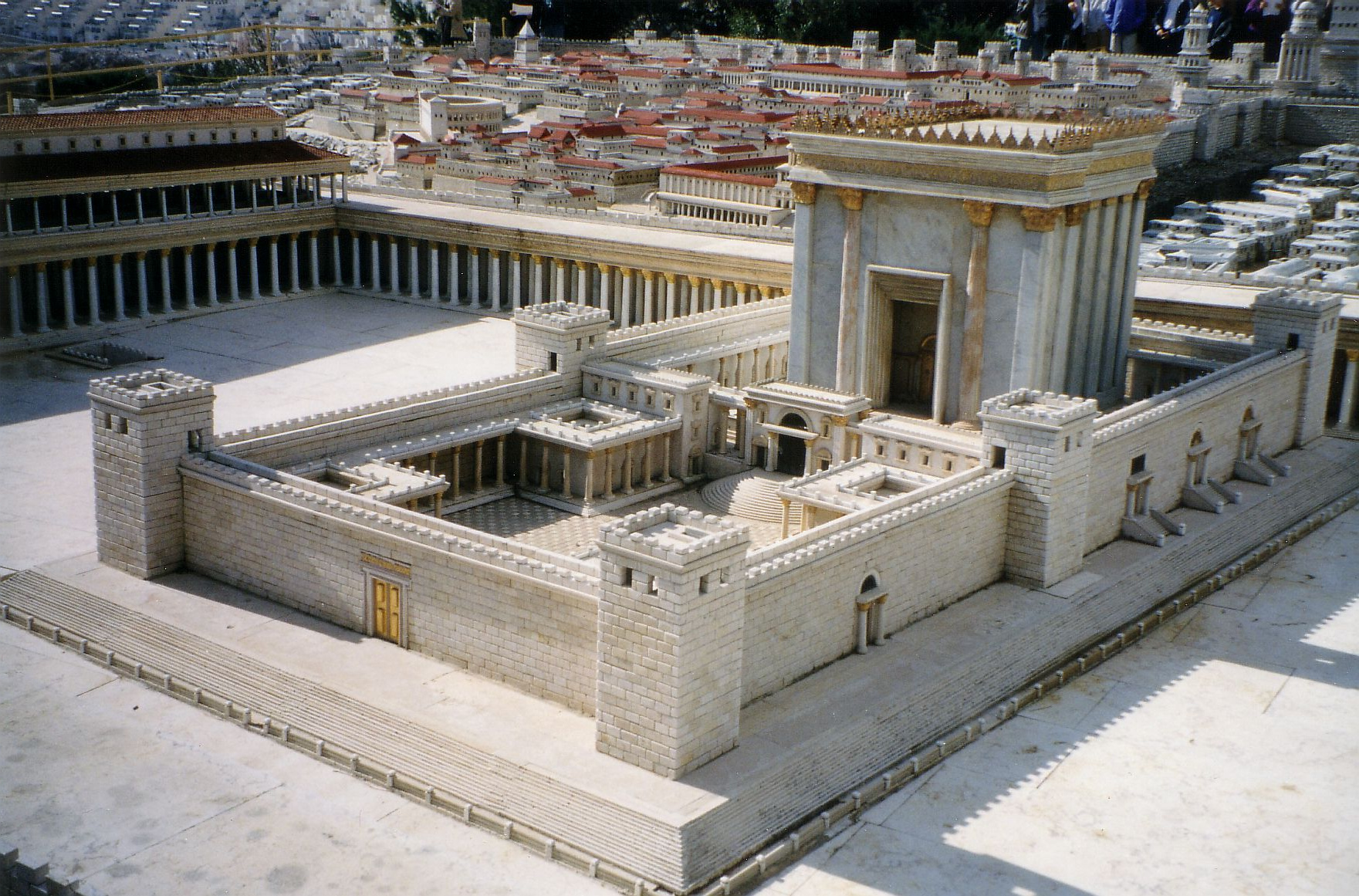
Model of the Second Temple

When the Temple was rebuilt after the Babylonian captivity, the Ark was no longer present in the Holy of Holies; instead, a portion of the floor was raised slightly to indicate the place where it had stood. In Jewish tradition, two curtains separated the Holy of Holies from the lesser Holy place during the period of the Second Temple. These curtains were woven with motifs directly from the loom, rather than embroidered, and each curtain had the thickness of a handbreadth (c. 9 cm or 3.5 in). Josephus records that Pompey profaned the Temple by insisting on entering the Holy of Holies in 63 BCE. When Titus captured the city during the First Jewish–Roman War, Roman soldiers took down the curtain and used it to wrap therein golden vessels retrieved from the Temple.

=== Yom Kippur ===
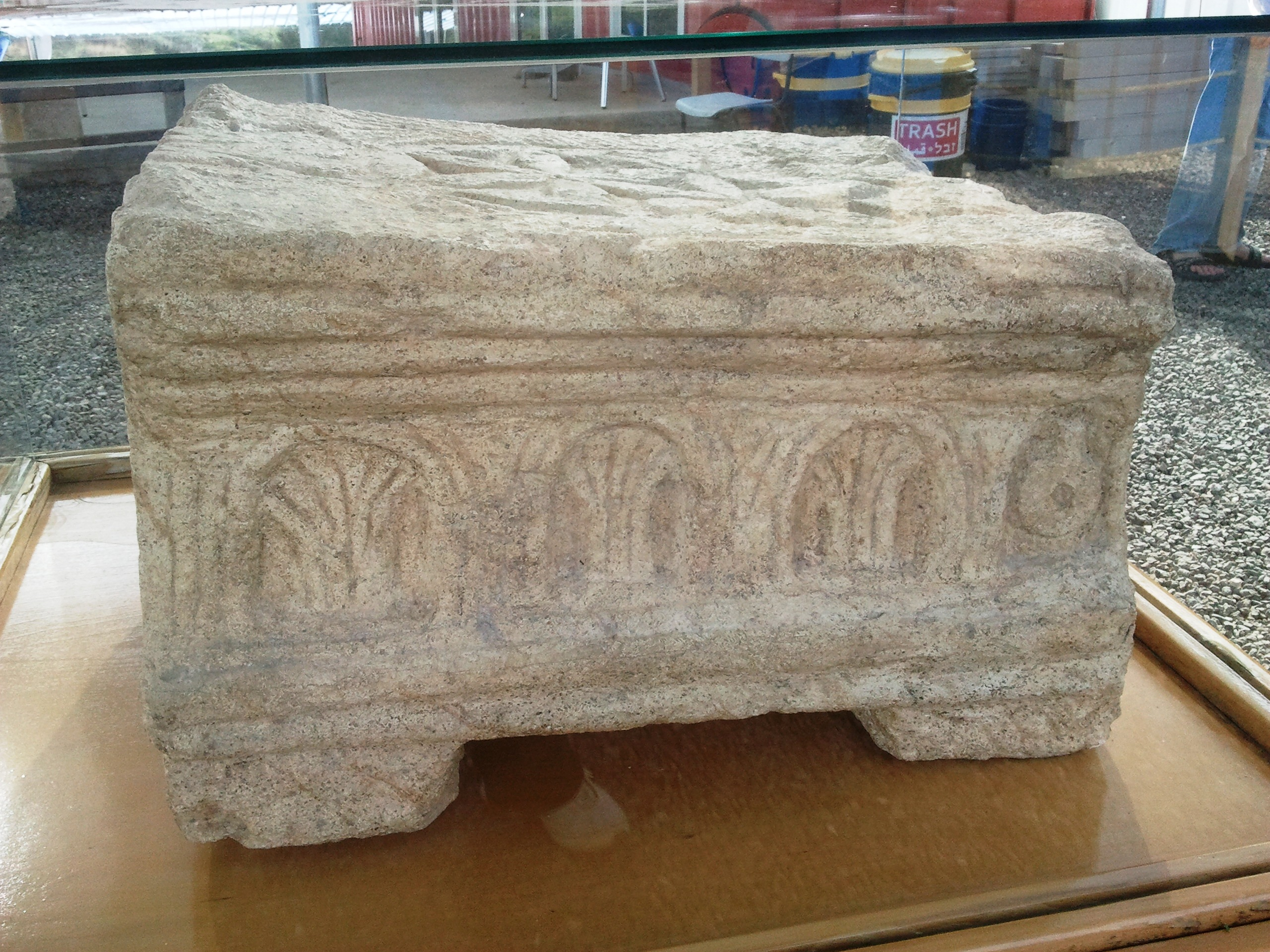
The Magdala stone

The Holy of Holies was entered once a year by the High Priest of Israel on Yom Kippur, to sprinkle the blood of sacrificial animals: a bull offered as atonement for the High Priest and his household, and the scapegoat offered as atonement for the people and offer incense on the Ark of the Covenant and the Mercy Seat that sat on top of it in the Solomon's Temple. The Second Temple had no Ark, so the blood was sprinkled where the Ark would have been, and an Altar of Incense was built. The goat was sacrificed and the blood was carried into the Holy of Holies. Gold was also present in the Most Holy Place.

== In ancient Judaism ==
The Magdala stone is thought to be a representation of the Holy of Holies carved before the destruction of the Temple in the year 70.

== In Rabbinical Judaism ==
Traditional Judaism regards the location where the inner sanctuary was located as retaining some or all of its original sanctity for use in a future Third Temple. The exact location of the Holy of Holies is a subject of dispute.

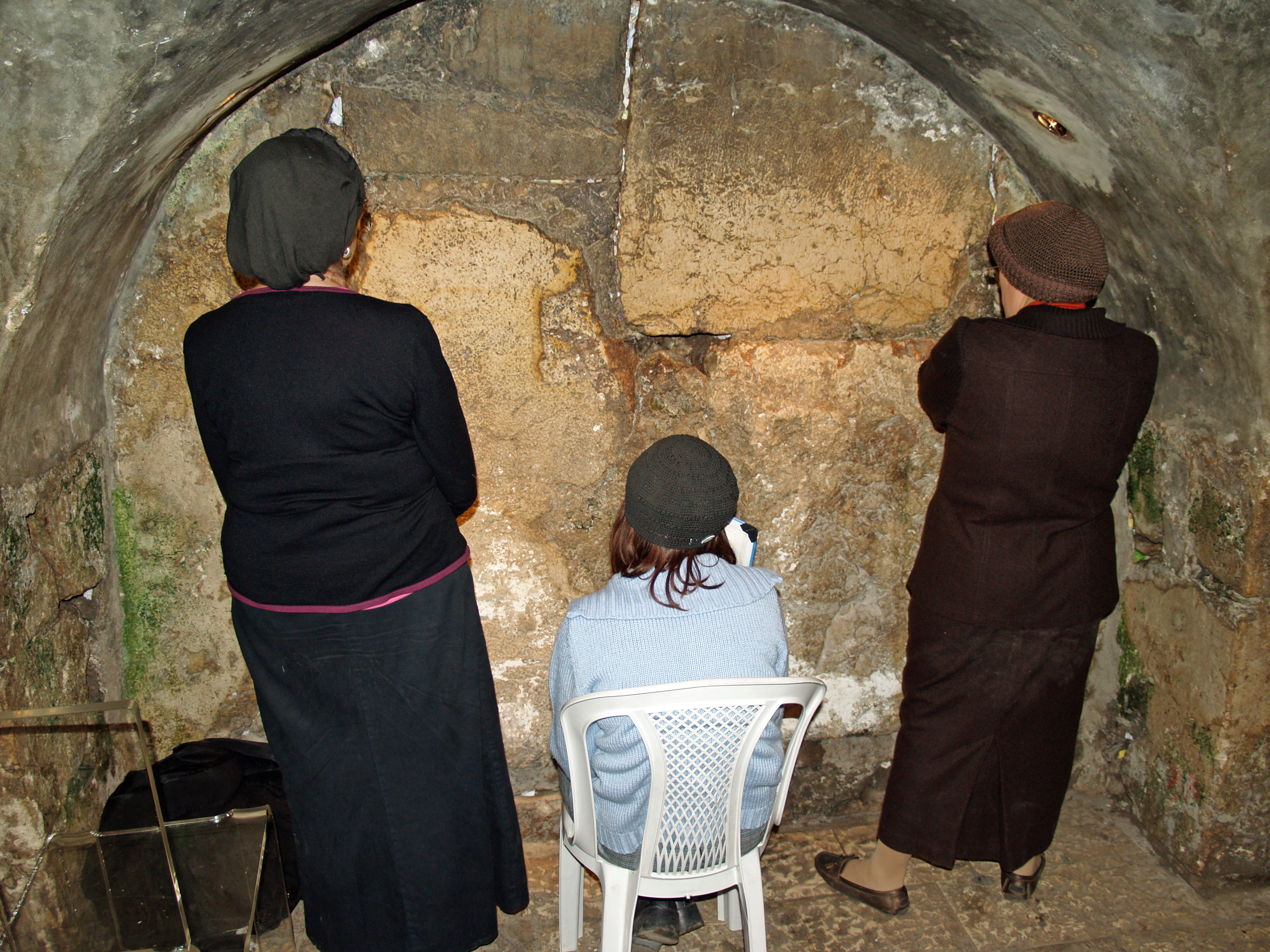
Women praying in the tunnel at the closest physical point to the site of the Holy of Holies not under the jurisdiction of the Jerusalem Islamic Waqf

Traditional Judaism regards the Holy of Holies as the place where the presence of God dwells. The Talmud gives detailed descriptions of Temple architecture and layout. According to the Babylonian Talmud, Tractate Yoma, the Holy of Holies was located in the center of the esplanade from a north–south perspective, but significantly to the west from an east–west perspective, with all the major courtyards and functional areas lying to its east.

The Talmud supplies additional details and describes the ritual performed by the High Priest. During the annual ritual, the High Priest would pronounce the Tetragrammaton, the only time it was pronounced. According to tradition, the people prostrated themselves fully on the ground when the Name was spoken. According to the Talmud, the High Priest's face upon exit from the Holy of Holies was radiant.

While under normal circumstances, access to the Holy of Holies was restricted to the High Priest and only on Yom Kippur, the Talmud suggests that repair crews were allowed inside as needed but were lowered from the upper portion of the room via enclosures so that they only saw the area they were to work on.

=== Synagogue architecture ===
Jews regards the Torah ark, a place in a synagogue where the Torah scrolls are kept, as a miniature Holy of Holies.

== Modern location ==
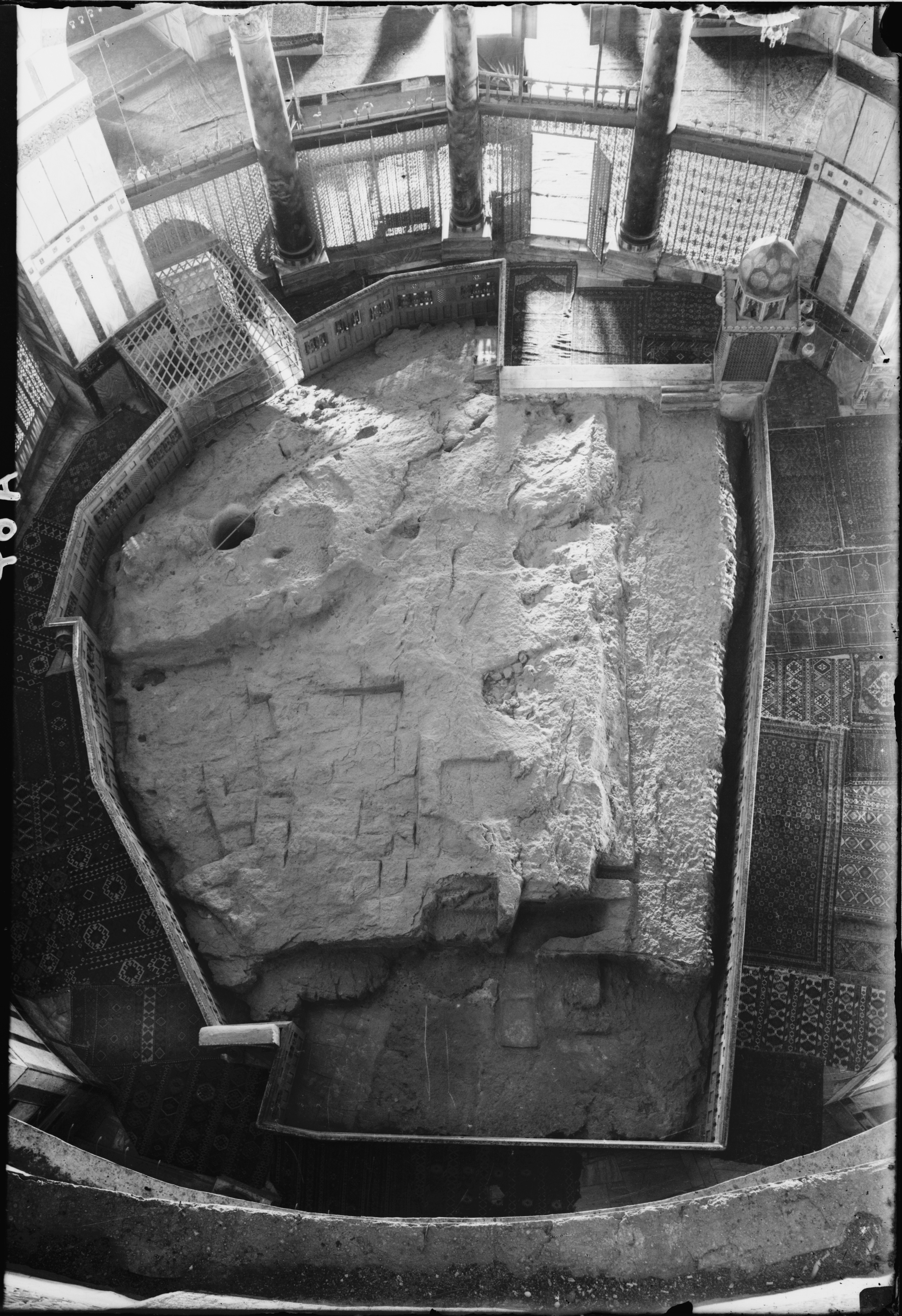
The Foundation Stone under the Dome of the Rock, one of the possible historical locations for the Jewish Holy of Holies

The exact location of the Holy of Holies is a contentious issue, as elements of questioning the exact placement of the Temple are often associated with Temple denial. There are three main theories as to where exactly the Temple stood on the Mount: where the Dome of the Rock is now located; to the north of the Dome of the Rock (Professor Asher Kaufman); or to the east of the Dome of the Rock (Professor Joseph Patrich of the Hebrew University).

The location of the Holy of Holies is connected to the location of the Jewish Temple. The location of the Temple, however, had become uncertain already less than 150 years after the Second Temple's destruction, as detailed in the Talmud. Chapter 54 of the Tractate Berakhot states that the Holy of Holies was directly aligned with the Golden Gate, which, assuming the current gate follows the same course as the now buried Herodian gate, would have placed the Holy of Holies slightly to the north of the Dome of the Rock, as Kaufman postulated. Chapter 54 of the Tractate Yoma and chapter 26 of the Tractate Sanhedrin, on the other hand, assert that the Holy of Holies stood directly on the Foundation Stone.

The Crusaders associated the Holy of Holies with the Well of Souls, which is located under the Foundation Stone of the Dome of the Rock. Most Orthodox Jews today completely avoid climbing up to Temple Mount, to prevent them from accidentally stepping on any holy areas. A few Orthodox Jewish authorities, following the opinion of the medieval scholar Maimonides, permit Jews to visit parts of the Temple Mount known not to be anywhere near any of the sanctified areas. Orthodox Jewish visitors to the Temple Mount, who come especially from those groups associated with the Temple Institute and its efforts to rebuild a Temple, seek to conform to the minimal requirements for coming near the Temple, such as immersing in a mikvah ("collection of water"; a ritual of purification), not coming during or following menstruation or immediately following a seminal emission, not showing their back towards its presumed location, etc.

To avoid religious conflict, Jewish visitors caught praying or bringing ritual objects are usually expelled from the area by police. The Chief Rabbinate of Israel also warns that "according to the Torah, it is forbidden for any person to enter the area of the Temple Mount due to its sacredness."

== In apocryphal literature ==
According to the ancient apocryphal Lives of the Prophets, after the death of Zechariah ben Jehoiada, the priests of the Temple could no more, as before, see the apparitions of the angels of the Lord, nor could make divinations with the Ephod, nor give responses from the Debir.

== Christianity ==
=== New Testament ===
The Koine New Testament retains the pre-Christian Septuagint phrase "Holy of the Holies", ἅγιον τῶν ἁγίων; without the definite article as "Holies of Holies" ἅγια ἁγίων in Hebrews 9:3. Koine Greek was the lingua franca of the Hellenistic period, which began with the death of Alexander the Great, and even after the rise of the Roman Empire, it remained the primary language of much of the Levant and North Africa, even after the early Muslim conquests.

In the Latin Vulgate of Jerome, these are rendered as sanctum sanctorum and sancta sanctorum, respectively.

=== Christian traditions ===
The ciborium, a permanent canopy over the altar in some churches, once surrounded by curtains at points in the liturgy, symbolizes the Holy of Holies. Some Christian churches, particularly the Catholic Church, consider the Church tabernacle, or its location (often at the rear of the sanctuary), as the symbolic equivalent of the Holy of Holies, due to the storage of the Consecrated Host (Eucharist in the Catholic Church) in that vessel.

==== Ethiopian Orthodox Tewahedo Church ====
A cognate term in Geʽez, qidduse qiddusan or bete meqdes, is used by the Orthodox Tewahedo, who believe the Ark of the Covenant is now in the Holy of Holies of Church of Our Lady Mary of Zion in Axum, Ethiopia, and only the Christian monk chosen as its protector may enter the Holy of Holies to view it.

Other churches have one or more tabots to sanctify them; this term may refer to a sacred tablet or to the Ark in which it is stored. These are placed on altars, and the Holy of Holies is covered with a curtain, similar to the parochet; there can be as many altars as there are tabots. There are often three entry points to a Holy of Holies to symbolise the Trinity.

==== Catholic Church ====
The Vulgate uses the translation sanctum sanctorum in Exodus 26:34. Reproducing in Latin the Hebrew construction, the expression is used as a superlative of the neuter adjective sanctum, to mean "a thing most holy". Catholics use it to refer to the Eucharist in the Church tabernacle, which is considered the physical presence of Christ.

The Vulgate also refers to the Holy of Holies with the plural form Sancta sanctorum in 2 Chronicles 5:7, possibly a synecdoche referring to the holy objects hosted there. This form is also used more broadly in Catholic tradition regarding sanctuaries other than the Temple in Jerusalem. A notable example is for the Church of San Lorenzo, Sancta Sanctorum, a chapel within the complex of St John Lateran in Rome.

==== Eastern Orthodox Church ====
The Greek phrase refers to the Tabernacle or Temple. The name in Greek for the sanctuary of a church is Ἱερόν Βῆμα (Hieron Vema, see Bema#Christianity), in Russian it is called Святой Алтарь (Svyatoy Altar – literally: "Holy Altar"), and in Romanian it is called Sfântul Altar.

==== Saint Thomas Christians ====
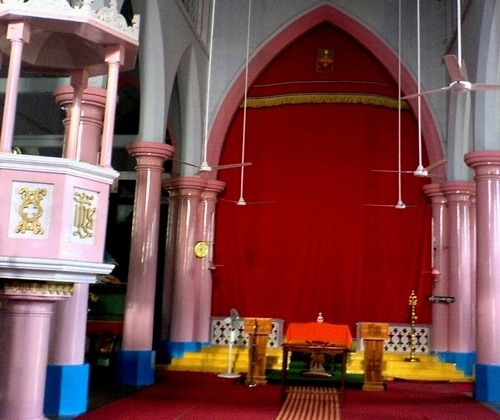
An Eastern Catholic church of the Syro-Malabar Church in Kerala, South India keeps the Holy of Holies veiled by a red curtain like the Temple of Jerusalem, as do Oriental Orthodox Churches such as the Jacobite Syrian Christian Church and the Malankara Orthodox Syrian Church.

The Saint Thomas Christians in Kerala, South India, veil their Holy of Holies most of the time. The red veil covers the inner or main altar. It is unveiled only during the central part of the main ritual, the Holy Qurbana, the eucharist.

==== The Church of Jesus Christ of Latter-day Saints ====
The Salt Lake Temple of the Church of Jesus Christ of Latter-day Saints (LDS Church) contains a Holy of Holies wherein the church's president—acting as the Presiding High Priest—enters to fulfill the relationship between the High Priest of Israel and God in accordance with the LDS Church's interpretation of the Book of Exodus (Exodus 25:22) and Latter-day Saint religious texts.

==== Seventh-Day Adventist Church ====
Seventh-Day Adventism (SDA) believes that the Holy of Holies on Earth was a copy of the true tabernacle in heaven, and this view can also be seen in other Christian denominations. Because in Hebrews, God commands Moses to make sure that all things according to the pattern shewed to thee in the Mount Sinai (Heb 8:2, 5). After the "Great Disappointment", preacher O. R. L. Crosier, Hiram Edson, and F. B. Hahn published new insights into Christ's sanctuary ministry that Jesus began to minister in the heavenly sanctuary after His ascension (Heb 9:24). Seventh-Day Adventism (SDA) believes that just as the high priest completed the special ministry on Yom Kippur and blessed the Israelites. Christ will come and bless his people after cleaning the Holy of Holies in heaven (Heb 9:23).

== See also ==
- Honden, the most sacred building at a Shinto shrine
- Garbhagriha - the most sacred part of a Hindu temple
- Lustral basin
- Warren's Gate, an ancient entrance into the Temple platform in Jerusalem
