= O. R. L. Crosier =

American Christian preacher (1820–1912)

Owen Russell Loomis Crosier (February 2, 1820 – September 15, 1912) was a Millerite preacher and editor from Canandaigua, New York. He died in Grand Rapids, Michigan, and was buried there in Oak Hill Cemetery.

== Involvement with the Millerites ==
The Millerite message was based on the preaching of William Miller and predicted that Christ would return about the year 1843, which was later refined to October 22, 1844. This belief was based on the day-year principle and an interpretation of the 2300 days mentioned in Daniel 8:14 which predicted that "the sanctuary would be cleansed". The Millerites understood this verse to point to Christ's return to "cleanse" the earth. O. R. L. Crosier collaborated with Hiram Edson and others in setting up and publishing a small Millerite paper, the Day-Dawn.

== The Great Disappointment ==
Crosier spent October 22, 1844 waiting for the event with Edson and others. On the morning after the Great Disappointment, Edson reportedly received an insight from God which explained that the Millerites’ error was not in the date, but in the event; that Jesus had begun His work as High Priest in the most holy place in Heaven. Crosier, Edson, and Hahn joined together to study the subject, and Crosier wrote out their findings on the subject of the sanctuary and its cleansing.

The findings published by Crosier, Hahn, and Edson led to a new understanding about the sanctuary in heaven. Their paper explained how there was a sanctuary in heaven, that Christ, the heavenly High Priest, was to cleanse. The believers understood this cleansing to be what the 2300 days in Daniel was referring to. This belief is known as the investigative judgment. Crosier's published account of Edson's vision came into the possession of James White (husband of Ellen G. White) and Joseph Bates, the latter of whom visited Edson in New York and converted him to the seventh-day Sabbath. Later, however, he repudiated the doctrine entirely.

== See also ==
- Millerites
- History of the Seventh-day Adventist Church
- Heavenly sanctuary
- Investigative judgment
