= Mercy seat =

Gold lid placed on the Ark of the Covenant

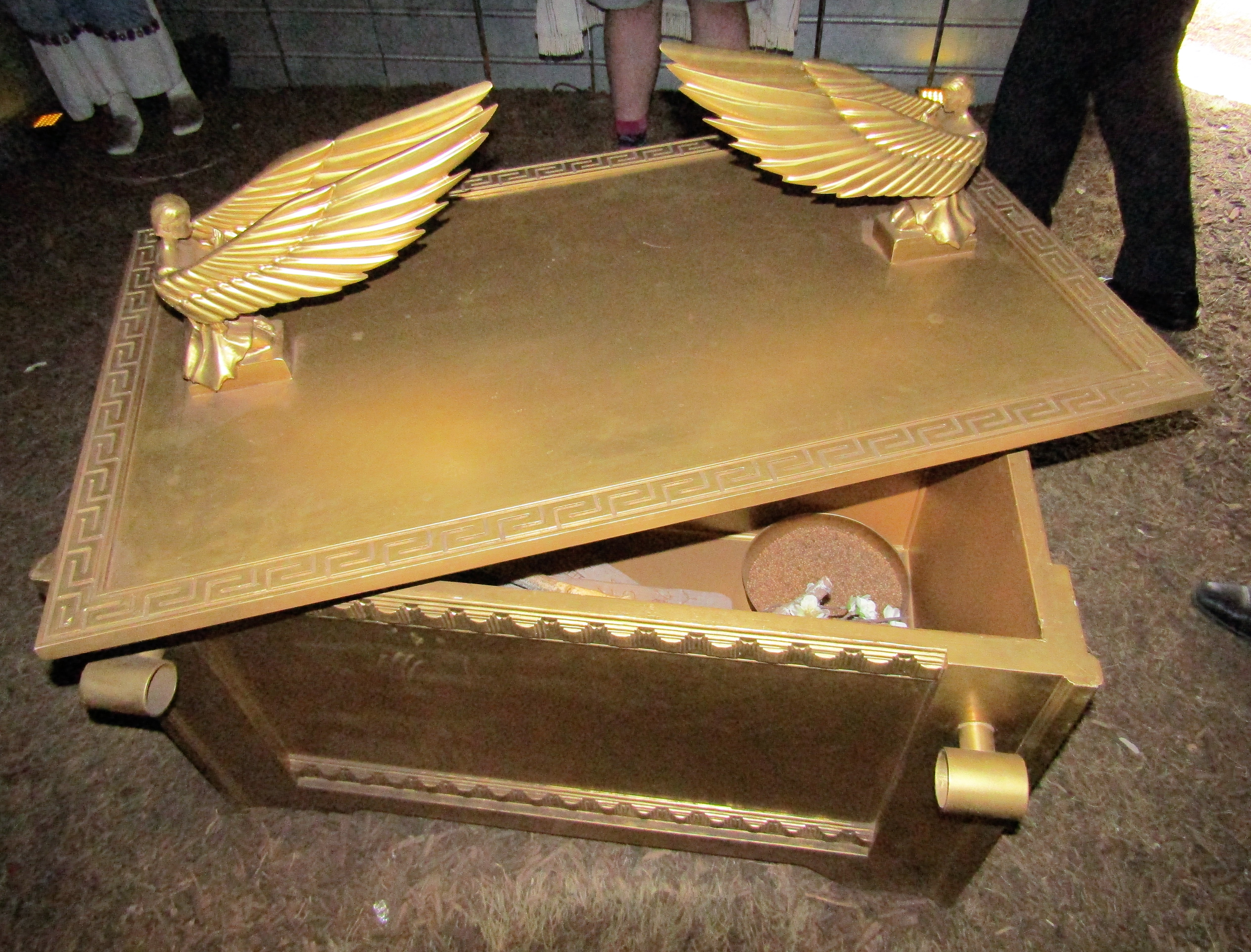
Replica of the ark of the covenant, with the "mercy seat" (kaporet) acting as lid.

According to the Hebrew Bible, the kaporet (Hebrew: כַּפֹּרֶת kapōreṯ) or mercy seat was the gold lid placed on the Ark of the Covenant, with two cherubim at the ends to cover and create the space in which Yahweh appeared and dwelled. This was connected with the rituals of the Day of Atonement. The term also appears in later Jewish sources, and twice in the New Testament, from where it has significance in Christian theology.

== Etymology ==
The etymology of kaporet (Hebrew: הַכַּפֹּֽרֶת) is unclear. Baruch J. Schwartz in The Oxford Dictionary of the Jewish Religion states that "some translate simply 'cover'", whilst others posit a different Hebrew or foreign origin.

== In Judaism ==
=== In the Hebrew Bible ===
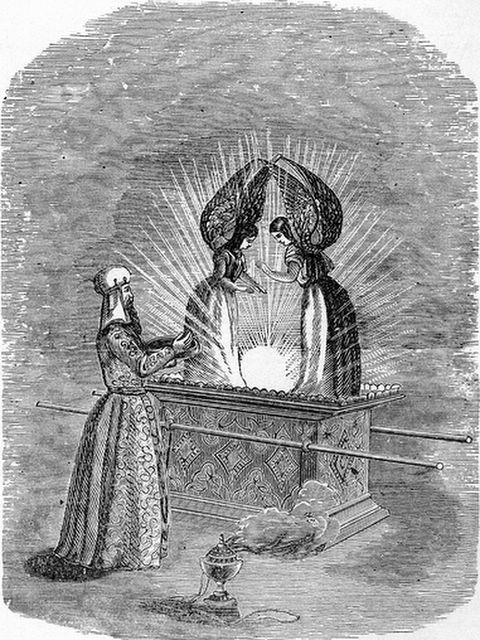
"The Ark and the Mercy Seat", 1894 illustration by Henry Davenport Northrop

According to the biblical account (Exodus 25:19; 37:6), the cover was made from pure gold and was the same width and breadth as the ark beneath it, 2.5 cubits long and 1.5 cubits wide. Two golden cherubim were placed at each end of the cover facing one another and the mercy seat, with their wings spread to enclose the mercy seat (Exodus 25:18–21). The cherubim formed a seat for God (1 Samuel 4:4). The ark and mercy seat were kept inside the Holy of Holies, the temple's innermost sanctuary which was separated from the other parts of the temple by a thick curtain (parochet).

The Holy of Holies could be entered only by the high priest on the Day of Atonement. The high priest sprinkled the blood of a sacrificial bull onto the mercy seat as an atonement for the sins of the people of Israel.

=== In rabbinic tradition ===
After the destruction of the Second Temple, just as the Torah scroll was contained in a Torah ark (Aron HaKodesh, "Holy ark") in synagogues, so also the term kaporet was applied to the valance of the parochet (Hebrew: פרוכת "curtain") on this ark. (Note: ... above the parokhet [curtain]. In Exodus 25:17, the kaporet refers to the slab of pure gold that covered the Ark ...) (Note: The art of the Torah Ark curtain (parochet) reached a peak during the first decades of the eighteenth century in Bavaria. ... All the Bavarian curtains of this type seem to have had an upper valance (kaporet), ...)

== Septuagint and Vulgate ==
In the Hellenistic Jewish Septuagint the term was rendered hilastērion (ἱλαστήριον, "thing that atones"), following the secondary meaning of the Hebrew root verb "cover" (כָּפַר kaphar) in pi'el and pu'al as "to cover sins", "to atone" found also in kippurim. Hilastērion is relatively rare in classical Greek and appears largely in late writings to reference a sacrifice to appease the wrath of a deity. The term in the Septuagint was translated in the Latin Vulgate Bible with the word propitiatorium from which we get our English word propitiation.

== In Christian tradition ==
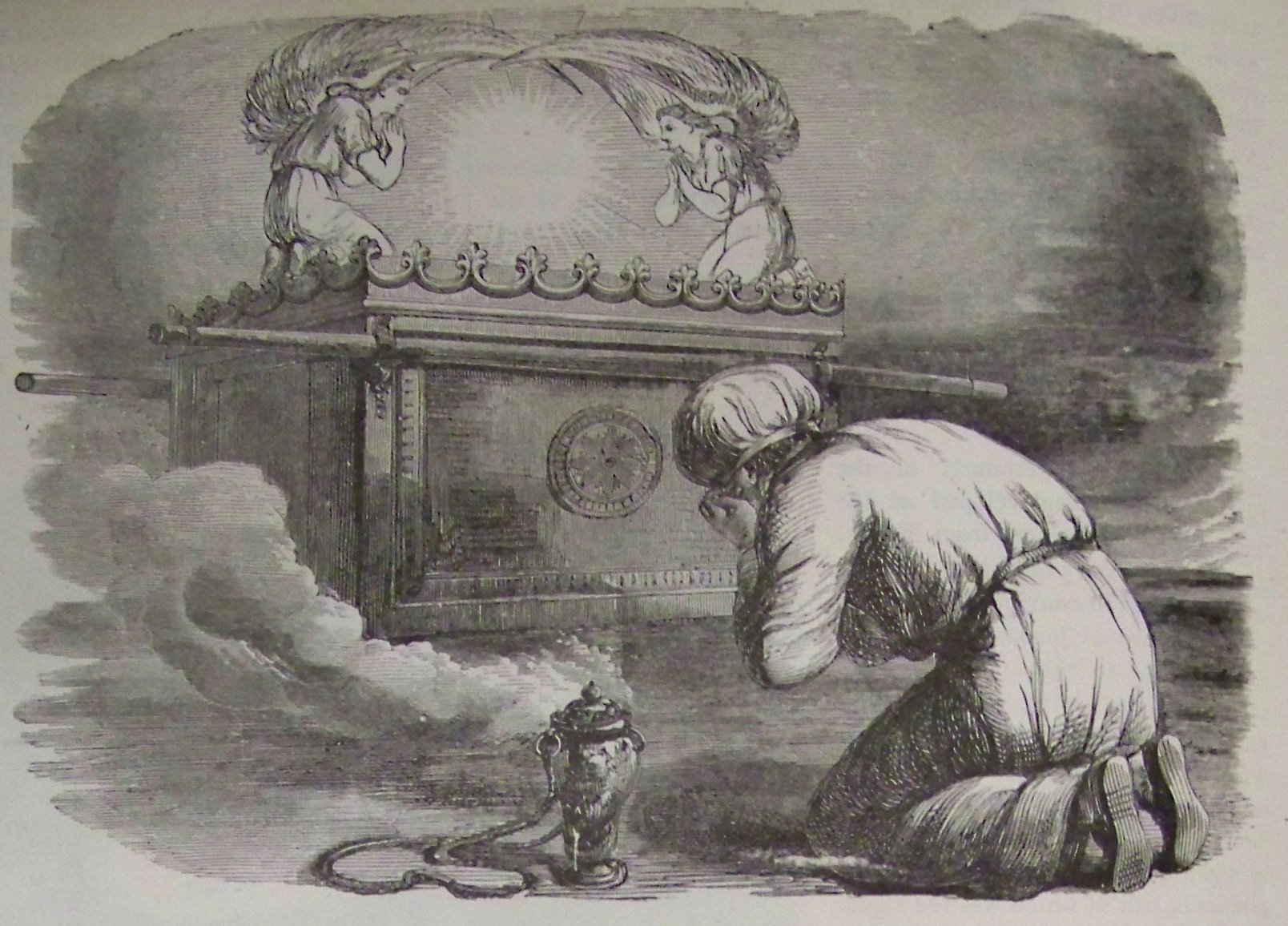
The mercy seat in the 1890 Holman Bible

=== In the New Testament ===
Hilastērion (see in section above) is found twice in the New Testament: Romans 3:25 and Hebrews 9:5. In the passage in Romans the term is typically translated "propitiation" or "sacrifice of atonement", whereas in the passage in Hebrews the term is typically translated "mercy seat", the traditional term for the gold lid on the Ark of the Covenant. The difference in translation is explained by the different contexts. In Romans the context is the sacrificial death of Christ, whereas in the Hebrew passage the context is a description of the Holy of Holies and its contents. The Epistle to the Hebrews portrays the role of the mercy seat during Yom Kippur Day of Atonement as a prefiguration of the Passion of Christ, which was a greater atonement, and the formation of a New Covenant (Hebrews 9:3–15). The Yom Kippur ritual was a shadow of things to come (Hebrews 10:1). The continual sacrifice for sin under the Mosaic covenant became obsolete following the once-for-all sacrificial death of Christ.

=== In English Bibles ===
The first English Bible, translated from Latin 1382, renders the term a propiciatory following the Vulgate propitiatorium, and in the first occurrence, Exodus 25:17, also inserts an unbracketed gloss "that is a table hiling the ark" – hiling is Middle English for "covering". (Note: Hilen v., to cover, bury, conceal; 3 sg. hileb. hilinge, ger., "concealment".) (Note: And thou schalt make a propiciatorie of clenneste gold; that is a table hilinge the arke; the lengthe therof schal holde twei cubitis and an half, the broodnesse schal holde a cubit and half. – Exodus 25:17, Wycliffe (1382))

The term propitiatory was also used by J. M. Powis Smith, a Protestant, in The Complete Bible: An American Translation, published in 1939. The originally Protestant translation "mercy seat" was not followed by Ronald Knox, but has since been largely adopted also by Roman Catholic Bible versions, such as the New Jerusalem Bible (NJB) 1985.
