= The John Loughborough School =

Location
- Holcombe Road; Tottenham, London, N17 9AD; England; 51°35′35″N 0°04′02″W

Information
- Type: Voluntary aided school
- Motto: Spiritus, Mens, Corpus
- Religious affiliation: Seventh-day Adventist
- Established: 1980
- Closed: 2013
- Local authority: Haringey
- Department for Education URN: 102167 Tables
- Ofsted: Reports
- Gender: Mixed
- Age: 11 to 16
- Website: www.lgfl.net/lgfl/leas/haringey/schools/john-loughborough

The John Loughborough School was a Christian, Voluntary aided school in Tottenham, London in the United Kingdom. It was operated by the Seventh-day Adventist Church. The school was named after John Norton Loughborough, an early Seventh-day Adventist minister.

The John Loughborough School was opened in April 1980 as an independent school. It joined the state system as a grant maintained school in September 1998, converting to voluntary aided status in the following year.

In 2013 Haringey London Borough Council decided to close The John Loughborough School. Reasons for the closure included low pupil attainment and a decline in pupil numbers at the school. Although the school appealed the decision, the closure was confirmed and pupils left the school for the final time at the end of the 2013 Summer term.
