= Heavenly sanctuary =

Seventh-day Adventist doctrine

In Seventh-day Adventist theology, the heavenly sanctuary teaching asserts that many aspects of the Hebrew tabernacle or sanctuary are representative of heavenly realities. In particular, Jesus is regarded as the High Priest who provides atonement for human sins by the sacrificial shedding of his blood at Calvary. The doctrine is based on Hebrews 4:14-15. As a whole, it is unique to Seventh-day Adventism, although other denominations share many of the typological identifications made by the epistle to the Hebrews (see Hebrews 8:2). One major aspect which is completely unique to Adventism is that the day of atonement is a type or foreshadowing of the investigative judgment. Technically, the "heavenly sanctuary" is an umbrella term which includes the investigative judgment, Christ's ministry in heaven before then, the understanding of Daniel 8:14, etc. However, it is often spoken of interchangeably with the investigative judgment.

The earthly Most Holy Place was entered once a year by the High Priest on the Day of Atonement to offer atonement for the Israelites. Adventists believe this is a symbol or "type" of Jesus' ministry in heaven. In 1844 Jesus moved from the Holy Place of the heavenly sanctuary into the Holy of Holies to begin a final atonement for humanity according to Daniel 7:13. This is understood as a change in the two phases of Jesus' ministry.

== Official position ==
One of the church's official 28 fundamental beliefs is:

24. Christ's Ministry in the Heavenly Sanctuary:
There is a sanctuary in heaven, the true tabernacle which the Lord set up and not man. In it Christ ministers on our behalf, making available to believers the benefits of His atoning sacrifice offered once for all on the cross. He was inaugurated as our great High Priest and began His intercessory ministry at the time of His ascension. In 1844, at the end of the prophetic period of 2300 days, He entered the second and last phase of His atoning ministry. It is a work of investigative judgment which is part of the ultimate disposition of all sin, typified by the cleansing of the ancient Hebrew sanctuary on the Day of Atonement. In that typical service the sanctuary was cleansed with the blood of animal sacrifices, but the heavenly things are purified with the perfect sacrifice of the blood of Jesus. The investigative judgment reveals to heavenly intelligences who among the dead are asleep in Christ and therefore, in Him, are deemed worthy to have part in the first resurrection. It also makes manifest who among the living are abiding in Christ, keeping the commandments of God and the faith of Jesus, and in Him, therefore, are ready for translation into His everlasting kingdom. This judgment vindicates the justice of God in saving those who believe in Jesus. It declares that those who have remained loyal to God shall receive the kingdom. The completion of this ministry of Christ will mark the close of human probation directly before the Second Advent. (Heb. 8:1-5; 4:14-16; 9:11-28; 10:19-22; 1:3; 2:16, 17; Dan. 7:9-27; 8:13, 14; 9:24-27; Num. 14:34; Eze. 4:6; Lev. 16; Rev. 14:6, 7; 20:12; 14:12; 22:12.)

== History ==
The historical foundation of the doctrine began with the Millerites who expected Jesus to return to earth on October 22, 1844. They interpreted the cleansing of the sanctuary (Daniel 8:14) to mean the cleansing of the earth by Jesus' coming. After the "Great Disappointment" when Christ did not come, those who awaited Christ further studied the prophecies and concluded that the event reached in time prophecy was actually the cleansing of the heavenly sanctuary. This understanding then initiated the Seventh-day Adventist Church.

Hiram Edson experienced a revelation concerning this new doctrine the day after the great disappointment, and the doctrine was subsequently worked out in more detail by Owen Crosier and others. Church pioneers James White and Ellen G. White wrote further about it over the succeeding years.

== Teaching ==
=== Biblical basis ===
Hebrews 8:1-5 -

"The point of what we are saying is this: We do have such a high priest, who sat down at the right hand of the throne of the Majesty in heaven, and who serves in the sanctuary, the true tabernacle set up by the Lord, not by man. Every high priest is appointed to offer both gifts and sacrifices, and so it was necessary for this one also to have something to offer. If he were on earth, he would not be a priest, for there are already men who offer the gifts prescribed by the law. They serve at a sanctuary that is a copy and shadow of what is in heaven. This is why Moses was warned when he was about to build the tabernacle: "See to it that you make everything according to the pattern shown you on the mountain." (New International Version)

=== Summary ===
Adventists traditionally believe that the blood of the daily sacrifices transferred the sins of penitent Israelites to the sanctuary, through the ministration of the priests in the "holy place" of the tabernacle (cf. Lev. 4). On the Day of Atonement, a set of rituals were performed by the Levitical high priest to "cleanse" the sanctuary of the accumulated sins, ultimately transferring the sins to the scapegoat (Azazel). This goat was sent into the wilderness, thus removing sin from the people entirely (cf Lev. 16).

Accordingly, Jesus ministered in the holy place of the heavenly sanctuary from his ascension until 1844. During this time the forgiven sins of Christians were transferred to the heavenly sanctuary. In 1844 he entered the most holy place, or holy of holies, to cleanse the heavenly sanctuary of its defilement. In the final judgment, the sins of all true Christians will be transferred to Satan, who is symbolised by the scapegoat.

The 1844 date is derived from the application of the day-year principle to Daniel 8:14. The starting year for calculating 1844 is seen as the command to restore and rebuilt Jerusalem by Artaxerxes in 457 B.C. on the basis of Daniel 9:24–27.

== See also ==
- Tabernacle (Judaism)
- Kohen Gadol (High Priest)
- Investigative judgment
- Seventh-day Adventist theology
- Seventh-day Adventist eschatology
- 28 fundamental beliefs
- The Pillars of Adventism
- Millerites
