= J. N. Loughborough =

American Seventh-day Adventist leader

John Norton Loughborough
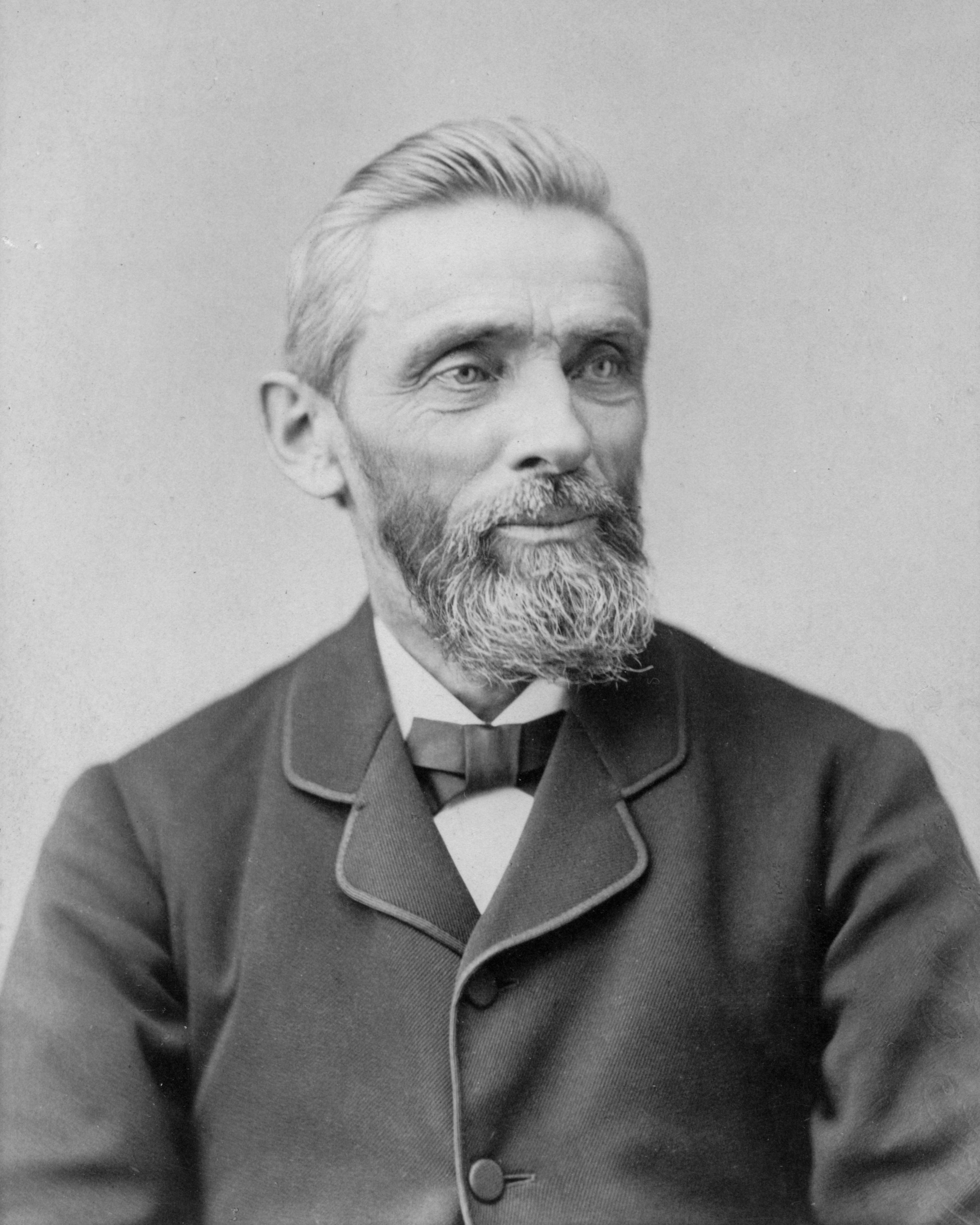
- Born: 26 January 1832
- Died: 7 April 1924 (aged 92)
- Occupations: Pioneer, and Minister of the Seventh-day Adventist Church

John Norton Loughborough (January 26, 1832 – April 7, 1924) was an early Seventh-day Adventist minister.

== Biography ==
Born in Victor, New York, Loughborough began preaching about the Second Coming of Christ at seventeen years of age, renting a church to deliver his lectures. He was involved in the Seventh-day Adventist movement from its early days, having been called to preach by Ellen White in 1852.

He worked for the Adventists in New England, Michigan, Ohio, Great Britain, and California. In 1878 Ellen White told him that his work for the church "must be made to tell for its full value and that he will have to preach the message." He published an account of the message and history of Seventh-day Adventism in 1902 titled The Rise and Progress of the Third Angel's Message, but the book was lost when the Review and Herald burned in Battle Creek, Michigan in 1903. He then published another book, The Great Second Advent Movement, in 1905. In it Loughborough describes his first-hand experiences in the history of the church, the visions and prophecies of Ellen White, early divisions in the church, and various philosophical and religious matters, as well as some autobiographical material.

F. C. Gilbert (1867-1946) discusses Loughborough's experiences with Ellen White's visions in his book Divine Predictions of Mrs. Ellen G. White Fulfilled, especially her predictions involving slavery and the onset of the American Civil War.

The John Loughborough School (1980-2013) in Tottenham, North London, was named after him.

One well known quote by Loughborough appeared in an October 8, 1861 Review and Herald article (now the Adventist Review), in which he was quoted speaking against the formation of creeds:

"The first step of apostasy is to get up a creed, telling us what we shall believe. The second is, to make that creed a test of fellowship. The third is to try members by that creed. The fourth to denounce as heretics those who do not believe that creed. And fifth, to commence persecution against such."

== Health reform ==
Loughborough became a strict vegetarian in 1863. He authored articles on diet and health for The Health Reformer. He compiled the first Adventist medical book, Handbook of Health (1868), which excerpted material from Sylvester Graham, James Caleb Jackson, Russell Thacher Trall and others.

He was active in Britain until 1883 and was a member of Christian Temperance Missionary Society, Temperance Alliance and Vegetarian Society.

== See also ==
- Seventh-day Adventist Church
- Seventh-day Adventist Church Pioneers
