= Palmoni =

Rare word in Classical Hebrew

Palmoni (Hebrew: פלמוני, romanized: Palmōnî) is a rare word seen in Classical Hebrew. It is used in the Hebrew Bible only in the Book of Daniel Chapter 8:13, where it is part of a passage where two angels discuss how much longer the sanctuary will be defiled. In general, most scholars translate it as "[a certain] one" – a reference to an unnamed person, or unnamed angel in this case. Some mystically-inclined Christians have instead translated it as the proper name of a specific angel, possibly due to the influence of the phrasing of a translator's note in the 1611 King James Version (Authorized Version) of the Bible on that verse. The marginal note suggested the angel might be "the numberer of secrets, or, the wonderful numberer".

== Usage in Daniel 8:13–14 ==
An interlinear translation of the Hebrew (shown left-to-right, rather than right-to-left) of Daniel 8:13 reads:

וָאֶשְׁמְעָה אֶחָד קָדוֹשׁ, מְדַבֵּר; וַיֹּאמֶר אֶחָד קָדוֹשׁ לַפַּלְמוֹנִי הַמְדַבֵּר, עַד מָתַי הֶחָזוֹן הַתָּמִיד וְהַפֶּשַׁע שֹׁמֵם תֵּת וְקֹדֶשׁ וְצָבָא, מִרְמָס.
Waeshme'a ahad kadosh, medaber; wayomer ahad kadosh lapalmoni hamedaber, ad matai hahazon hatamid vehapesha shomem tet vekodesh vetzava, mirmas.
{And I heard} a {holy one} speaking; {and said} another {holy one} {to that certain [one]} {who was speaking}, how {long [will be]} {the vision} {[concerning] the daily [sacrifices]} {and the transgression} {of desolation} {the giving} {and both the sanctuary} {and the host} {to be trampled under [foot].}
Then I heard a holy one speaking, and another holy one said to him, "How long will it take for the vision to be fulfilled—the vision concerning the daily sacrifice, the rebellion that causes desolation, the surrender of the sanctuary and the trampling underfoot of the LORD's people?" (NIV)

The form palmōnî is unique in the Masoretic Text version of the Hebrew Bible, seen nowhere else. However, there are close variants elsewhere; Harold Louis Ginsberg and John J. Collins both suggest it is a fusion of pelōnî and 'almōnî, seen in Ruth 4:1, 1 Samuel 21:3, and 2 Kings 6:8. It is also possibly influenced or an adaptation of an Aramaic version of the verse. It seems to be a reference to a specific but unnamed person, "[some]one" or "so-and-so". More literal translations render the larger passage as "another holy one said to whomever it was that was speaking", that is, the first angel in the verse.

In larger context, this passage in Daniel is generally considered to be discussing the persecution of Judaism during the 160s BC by King Antiochus IV Epiphanes of the Seleucid Empire which ruled Judea at the time. The sanctuary is a reference to the Second Temple, which had become defiled in the eyes of traditionalist Jews by the introduction of an "abomination of desolation" and syncretic practices that combined Judaism with Greek paganism. The tamid (daily sacrifices; korban) ceased, which was considered disastrous by traditionalists. Verse 14 offers the hope of a limit on the length of this disruption:

Then I heard a holy one speaking, and another holy one said to the one who spoke, "For how long is this vision concerning the regular burnt offering, the transgression that makes desolate, and the giving over of the sanctuary and host to be trampled?" And he answered him, "For two thousand three hundred evenings and mornings; then the sanctuary shall be restored to its rightful state." (NRSV-UE)

— Daniel 8:13–14

This limit has been interpreted as both 2,300 days (approximately ~6 and a half years), or as 1,150 days (approximately ~3 years) if the "nights and mornings" is a reference to a twice-daily sacrifice, thus counting two for each day.

== As the name of an angel ==
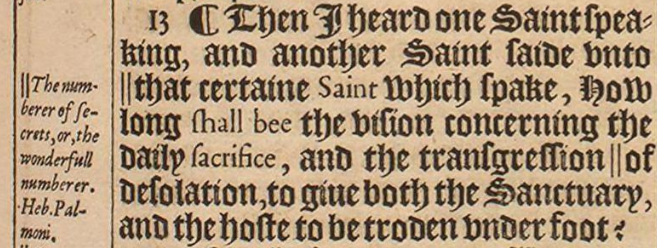
The 1611 edition of the King James Version (Authorized Version) of Daniel 8:13

The 1611 King James Version translates the passage as "Then I heard one Saint speaking, and another Saint said unto that certain Saint which spake." It also includes a margin note with an alternate translation as "the numberer of secrets, or, the wonderful numberer". This seems to have been a guess that 'palmoni' was perhaps a combination of péle (פֶּלֶא, "wonderful") and the ending form of manah (מנה, "to count"), given that the question is about a number. Various others in the modern era have expanded on the idea of a "wonderful counter" angel named Palmoni, especially those interested in mystical numerology.

The Swiss astronomer Jean-Philippe de Cheseaux applied the day-year principle of interpreting Biblical prophecy, and decided that 2,300 "days" would indicate 2,300 years. He then took the period of 2,300 years and subtracted from it 1,260 years – a number referred to indirectly in Daniel as "a time and times and the dividing of time" (Dan. 7:25) or "a time, times, and a half" (Dan. 12:7), where a time is equal to 360, times are equal to 720 (2 × 360), and a half is equal to 180 (360/2) – he got 1,040 years. 19th-century theological author Henry Grattan Guinness wrote that this was "the largest accurate soli-lunar cycle known." The astrologer Walter Gorn Old, writing under the nom de plume Sepharial, wrote that "I have made a calculation and find that with a solar year equal to 365.242264 days, we get in 1040 such years exactly 12,863 lunations, each of 29 days, 12 hours, 44 minutes, 2.8 seconds, which does not differ from the most recent astronomical estimate by a single second."

Francis John Bodfield Hooper wrote Palmoni: An Essay of the Chronological and Numerical Systems in Use Among the Ancient Jews in 1851, providing a number of numerological interpretations of biblical passages and how they tied into history, including the 2,300 (or 1,150) days mentioned in Daniel 8:13. Milo Mahan, a Virginian minister, wrote a book of Christian numerology called Palmoni, or, The Numerals of Scripture (1863) which cited the KJV margin note as inspiration for the title. Mahan also wrote that "the word Palmoni['s] numerical value is 80, 30, 40, 6, 50, 10, or 216, which is the Three times Three times Three multiplied by Eight: a most significant combination."
