= Four kingdoms of Daniel =

Biblical theme from the Book of Daniel

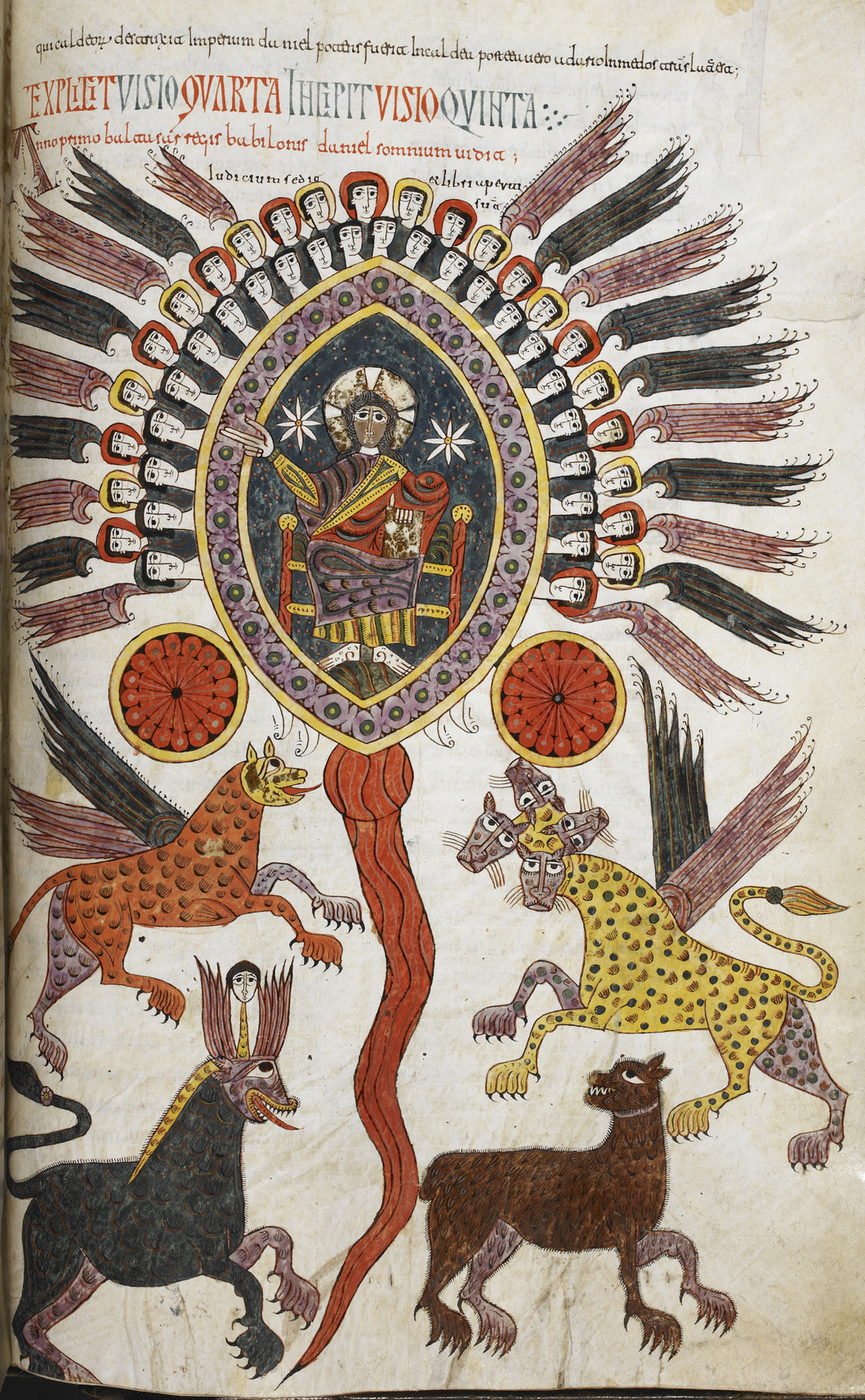
The four beasts and the Ancient of Days, depicted in the Silos Apocalypse

The four kingdoms of Daniel are four kingdoms which, according to the Book of Daniel, precede the "end-times" and the "Kingdom of God".

== The four kingdoms ==
=== Historical background ===
The Book of Daniel originated from a collection of legends circulating in the Jewish community in Babylon and Mesopotamia in the Persian and early Hellenistic periods (5th to 3rd centuries BC), and was later expanded by the visions of chapters 7–12 in the Maccabean era (mid-2nd century BC).

The "four kingdoms" theme appears explicitly in Daniel 2 and Daniel 7, and is implicit in the imagery of Daniel 8. Daniel's concept of four successive world empires is drawn from Greek theories of mythological history. The symbolism of four metals in the statue in chapter 2 is drawn from Persian writings, while the four "beasts from the sea" in chapter 7 reflect Hosea 13:7–8, in which God threatens that he will be to Israel like a lion, a leopard, a bear or a wild beast. The consensus among scholars is that the four beasts of chapter 7, like the metals of chapter 2, symbolise Babylon, Media, Persia and the Seleucid Greeks, with Antiochus IV as the "small horn" that uproots three others (Antiochus usurped the rights of several other claimants to become king).

=== Daniel 2 ===
In chapter 2, Nebuchadnezzar dreams of a statue made of four different materials, identified as four kingdoms:

1. Head of gold. Explicitly identified as King Nebuchadnezzar of Babylon (v. 37–38).
2. Chest and arms of silver. Identified as an "inferior" kingdom to follow Nebuchadnezzar (v. 39).
3. Belly and thighs of bronze. A third kingdom which shall rule over all the earth (v. 39).
4. Legs of iron with feet of mingled iron and clay. Interpreted as a fourth kingdom, strong as iron, but the feet and toes partly of clay and partly of iron show it shall be a divided kingdom (v. 41).

=== Daniel 7 ===
In chapter 7, Daniel has a vision of four beasts coming up out of the sea, and is told that they represent four kingdoms:

1. A beast like a lion with eagle's wings (v. 4).
2. A beast like a bear, raised up on one side, with three ribs between its teeth (v. 5).
3. A beast like a leopard with four wings of fowl and four heads (v. 6).
4. A fourth beast, with large iron teeth and ten horns (v. 7–8).

This is explained as a fourth kingdom, different from all the other kingdoms; it "will devour the whole earth, trampling it down and crushing it" (v. 23). The ten horns are ten kings who will come from this kingdom (v. 24). A further horn (the "little horn") then appears and uproots three of the previous horns: this is explained as a future king.

=== Daniel 8 ===
In chapter 8 Daniel sees a ram with two horns destroyed by a he-goat with a single horn; the horn breaks and four horns appear, followed once again by the "little horn". The passage says the goat is the king of Greece and its initial horn its first king (v21).

== Schools of thought ==
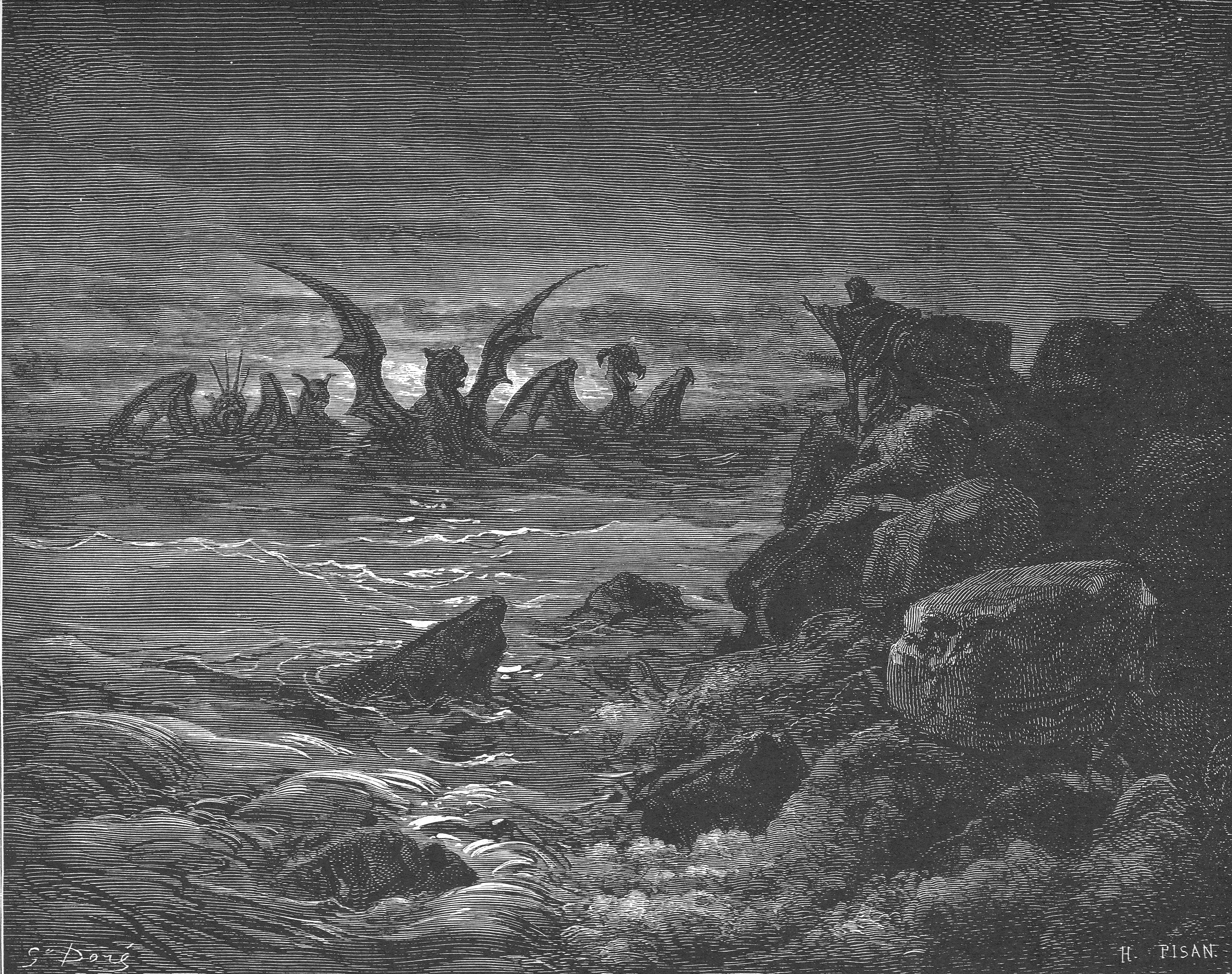
Daniel's Vision of the Beasts, 1866 engraving by Gustave Doré.

=== Rashi's interpretation ===
Rashi, a medieval rabbi, interpreted the four kingdoms as Nebuchadnezzar ("you are the head of gold"), Belshazzar ("another kingdom lower than you"), Alexander of Macedon ("a third kingdom of copper"), and the Roman Empire ("and in the days of these kings"). Rashi explains that the fifth kingdom that God will establish is the kingdom of the messiah.

=== Christian interpretation ===
From the time of the Protestant Reformation in the 16th century, the "four monarchies" model became widely used by all for universal history, in parallel with eschatology, among Protestants. Some continued to defend its use in universal history in the early 18th century.

There are references in classical literature and arts that apparently predate the use of the succession of kingdoms in the Book of Daniel. One appears in Aemilius Sura, an author quoted by Velleius Paterculus (c. 19 BC – c. AD 31). This gives Assyria, Media, Persia and Macedonia as the imperial powers. The fifth empire became identified with the Romans. (After the 17th century, the concept of a fifth monarchy was re-introduced from Christian millennarian ideas.)

An interpretation proposed by Swain (1940) sees the "four kingdoms" theory, an import from Asia Minor, becoming the property of Greek and Roman writers in the early 2nd century BC. They built on a three-kingdom sequence, already mentioned by Herodotus (c. 484–425 BC) and by Ctesias (fl. 401 BC). Several other authors have since contested this dating and origin, placing the life-time of Sura and the Roman adaptation of the model in the 1st century BC.

Christian Reconstructionists and Full Preterists believe that Daniel is completely fulfilled, and that the believers are now working to establish the Kingdom of God on earth.

Two main schools of thought on the four kingdoms of Daniel, are:

1. the traditionalist view, supporting the conflation of Medo-Persia and identifying the last kingdom as the Roman Empire.
2. the Maccabean thesis, a view that supports the separation of the Medes from the Persians and identifies the last kingdom as the Seleucid Empire.

==== Roman Empire schema ====
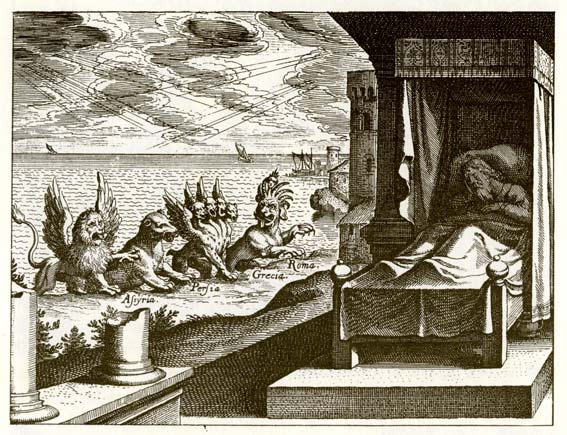
This 1630 engraving of Daniel's vision in chapter 7 by Matthäus Merian follows Jerome's interpretation of the four beasts, but with "Assyria" in place of "Babylon".

The following interpretation represents a traditional view of Jewish and Christian Historicists, Futurists, Dispensationalists, Partial Preterists, and other futuristic Jewish and Christian hybrids, as well as certain Messianic Jews, who typically identify the kingdoms in Daniel (with variations) as:

1. the Babylonian Empire
2. the Medo-Persian Empire
3. the Greek Empire
4. the Roman Empire, with other implications to come later

Jerome (c. 347–420) described this scheme in his Commentary on Daniel. Within this framework there are numerous variations.

===== Use with the Book of Revelation =====
Christian interpreters typically read the Book of Daniel along with the New Testament's Book of Revelation. The Church Fathers interpreted the beast in Revelation 13 as the empire of Rome. The majority of modern scholarly commentators understand the "city on seven hills" in Revelation as a reference to Rome.

===== Second temple theory =====
Full Preterists, Idealists, certain Reconstructionists and other non-futurists likewise typically believe in the same general sequence, but teach that Daniel's prophecies ended with the destruction of the Second Temple of Jerusalem, and have few to no implications beyond that. Jewish and Christian Futurists, Dispensationalists, and, to some degree, Partial Preterists believe that the prophecies of Daniel stopped with the destruction of the Second Temple of Jerusalem; but will resume at some point in the future after a gap in prophecy that accounts for the Church Age.

== Traditional views ==
=== Eschatological themes ===
For over two thousand years readers have speculated as to the meaning of the themes running through the Book of Daniel:

- The four kingdoms: In Daniel 2 Nebuchadnezzar dreams of a giant statue of four metals identified as symbolising kingdoms, and in Daniel 7 Daniel sees a vision of four beasts from the sea, again identified as kingdoms. In Daniel 8, in keeping with the theme by which kings and kingdoms are symbolised by "horns", Daniel sees a goat with a single horn replaced by four horns. Secondary symbols are involved with each: the statue is smashed by a mysterious stone which grows into a mountain, and the fourth beast has ten horns and an additional human-like horn, identified as a king. Further imagery includes Daniel 7's Son of Man (more accurately "one like a son of man"), the "holy ones of the Most High", and the eternal Kingdom of God which will follow the four kingdoms and the "little horn".
- Chronological predictions: Daniel predicts several times the length of time that must elapse until the coming of the Kingdom of God. A prophecy of Jeremiah is reinterpreted so that "70 years" means "70 weeks of years", and the last half of the last "week" is defined as "a time, times, and half a time", then as 2,300 "evenings and mornings", with further numbers of days at the very end of the book.
- The "anointed one cut off": Daniel 9 makes two references to an "anointed one", which has had major implications for Christian eschatology. Daniel 9:25 says: "Until there is an anointed ruler will be seven weeks"; the next verse says: "After the sixty-two weeks the anointed one shall be cut off." Scholars take these as references to the high priest Joshua from the early Persian era and to the high priest Onias III, murdered in the 2nd century, but Christians have taken them both to refer to the death of Christ, which then provides a fixed point for calculating the time to the end of the world.
- The "abomination of desolation": This is mentioned in Daniel 8, 9 and 11. In the New testament this was taken to refer to the eschatological future and the destruction of Jerusalem (Matthew 24:15, Mark 13:14), and later still it was interpreted as the Antichrist.
- Martydom and resurrection: Daniel 11 tells how the "wise" lay down their lives as martyrs at the end-time persecution for resurrection into the final kingdom. Daniel 3 (the story of the Fiery Furnace) and Daniel 6 (Daniel in the lions' den) were read in this light, providing a prototype for Christian martyrdom and salvation through the centuries.

=== Seventh-day Adventists ===
The prophecy of 2,300 days in Daniel 8:14 plays an important role in Seventh-day Adventist eschatology. The 2,300 days are interpreted as 2,300 years using the day-year principle. According to the Adventist teaching, this period starts in unison with the Prophecy of Seventy Weeks in 457 BC and ends in 1844 AD. It was thought that the end of this period would bring the end of days as advocated by the Millerite movement at the turn of the 19th century.

Chapter	Parallel sequence of prophetic elements as understood by Historicists					
	Past				Present	Future
Daniel 2	Head; Gold (Babylon)	Chest and two arms Silver	Belly and thighs Bronze	Two legs Iron	Two feet with toes Clay and iron	Rock; God's unending kingdom left to no other people
Daniel 7	Winged lion	Lopsided bear	Four headed / four winged Leopard	Iron toothed beast with little horn	Judgment scene Beast slain	Son of man comes in clouds Gets everlasting dominion and gives it to saints.
Daniel 8		Two-horned Ram (Media-Persia)	Single-horned / four-horned goat Four winds (Greece)	Little horn A master of intrigue	Cleansing of the sanctuary Leads to →	(Kingdom of God)
Daniel 11–12		Kings (Persia)	North and south kings 4 winds (Greece)	North and South Kings; A contemptible person of intrigue (pagan and papal Rome)	North and south kings End times (global religio-political government)	Michael stands up Many dead awake to everlasting life
(Nations in parentheses are interpretation of symbols as given in the text. Nations in italic parentheses are Historicist interpretation. "One like a son of man" and "Michael" are understood to be the same being.)

Most Adventist groups in the Millerite tradition hold similar beliefs about the Great Apostasy, as do those of other Restorationist types of Christian faith. Some of these, most notably the Seventh-day Adventist Church, have traditionally held that the apostate church formed when the Bishop of Rome began to dominate and brought heathen corruption and allowed pagan idol worship and beliefs to come in, and formed the Roman Catholic Church, and to rest from their work on Sunday, instead of Sabbath, which is not in keeping with Scripture.

Seventh-day Adventists teach that the Little Horn Power which as predicted rose after the breakup of the Roman Empire is the papacy. In 533 AD Justinian, the emperor of the Eastern Roman Empire, legally recognized the bishop (pope) of Rome as the head of all the Christian churches. Because of the Arian domination of some of the Roman Empire by the barbarian tribes, this authority could not be exercised by the bishop of Rome. Finally, in 538 AD, Belisarius, one of Justinian's generals, routed the Ostrogoths, the last of the barbarian kingdoms, from the city of Rome and the bishop of Rome could begin establishing his universal civil authority. So, by the military intervention of the Eastern Roman Empire, the bishop of Rome became all-powerful throughout the area of the old Roman Empire.

Like many reformation-era Protestant leaders, the writings of Adventist pioneer Ellen White speak against the Catholic Church as a fallen church and in preparation for a nefarious eschatological role as the antagonist against God's true church and that the pope is the Antichrist. Many Protestant reformers such as Martin Luther, John Knox, William Tyndale and others held similar beliefs about the Catholic Church and the papacy when they broke away from the Catholic Church during the Reformation.

Ellen White writes,

His word has given warning of the impending danger; let this be unheeded, and the Protestant world will learn what the purposes of Rome really are, only when it is too late to escape the snare. She is silently growing into power. Her doctrines are exerting their influence in legislative halls, in the churches, and in the hearts of men. She is piling up her lofty and massive structures in the secret recesses of which her former persecutions will be repeated. Stealthily and unsuspectedly she is strengthening her forces to further her own ends when the time shall come for her to strike. All that she desires is vantage ground, and this is already being given her. We shall soon see and shall feel what the purpose of the Roman element is. Whoever shall believe and obey the word of God will thereby incur reproach and persecution.

=== Jehovahʼs Witnesses ===
Daniel 2:37-39 show that this a succession of world powers, starting with Nebuchadnezzar, followed by Persia, Greece, Rome, and finally the world power of Britain and America, beginning during World War One. (Revelation 17:10) The clay in the feet and toes refers to common people protesting against such ironlike rulership. (Daniel 2:41-43)

=== Baháí Faith ===
The Baháʼí Faith interprets the prophecy of the 2300 days and the 70 weeks in the same manner as the Seventh-day Adventists, with the period ending in the year 1844. In Baháʼí belief, 1844 marked the end of the old world and the start of the millennial period. This meant the end of the Islamic age, the end of the prophetic cycle of all religions, and the inauguration of the common era where the fulfillment of prophecies would occur for all religions. For the Baháʼí, the promise of the return of God's Messenger was fulfilled in this year by the appearance of the Báb, followed 19 years later by Baha'u'llah.

=== Methodists ===
Methodist theologian and historicist Adam Clarke proposed an alternative to the 1844 date as used by Seventh-day Adventists and followers of Baháʼí Faith. Clarke viewed Daniel 8 as a separate vision from Daniel 7. In his 1831 commentary on Daniel 8:14, he states that the 2,300-year period should be calculated from 334 BC, the year Alexander the Great began his conquest of the Persian Empire. His calculation ends in the year 1966, where he links to Daniel 7:25.

The traditional interpretation of the four kingdoms, shared among Jewish and Christian expositors for over two millennia, identifies the kingdoms as the empires of Babylon, Medo-Persia, Greece and Rome. This view conforms to the text of Daniel, which considers the Medo-Persian Empire as one, as with the "law of the Medes and Persians".^{(6:8, 12, 15)} These views have the support of the Jewish Talmud, medieval Jewish commentators, Christian Church Fathers, Jerome, and Calvin.

Jerome specifically identified the four kingdoms of Daniel 2 in this way. The "four monarchies" theory existed alongside the Six Ages and the Three Eras, as general historical structures, in the work of Augustine of Hippo, a contemporary of Jerome.

The alternative view which sees the sequence ending with Greece and the Diadochi, thus excluding Rome, is not without historical precedent however. The pagan critic of Christianity, Porphyry, suggested a variation of this interpretation in the third century CE. In the following centuries, several Eastern Christians espoused this view, including Ephrem the Syrian, Polychronius, and Cosmas Indicopleustes.

During the Medieval ages the orthodox Christian interpretation followed the commentary by Jerome on the Book of Daniel. It tied the fourth monarchy and its end to the end of the Roman Empire, which was considered not to have yet come to pass (the Eastern Roman Empire persisted until 1453). This is the case for example in the tenth-century writer Adso, whose Libellus de Antichristo incorporated the characteristic medieval myth of the Last Roman Emperor. Otto of Freising used the principle of translatio imperii and took the Holy Roman Empire as the continuation of the Roman Empire (as fourth monarchy).

=== Protestant Reformation ===
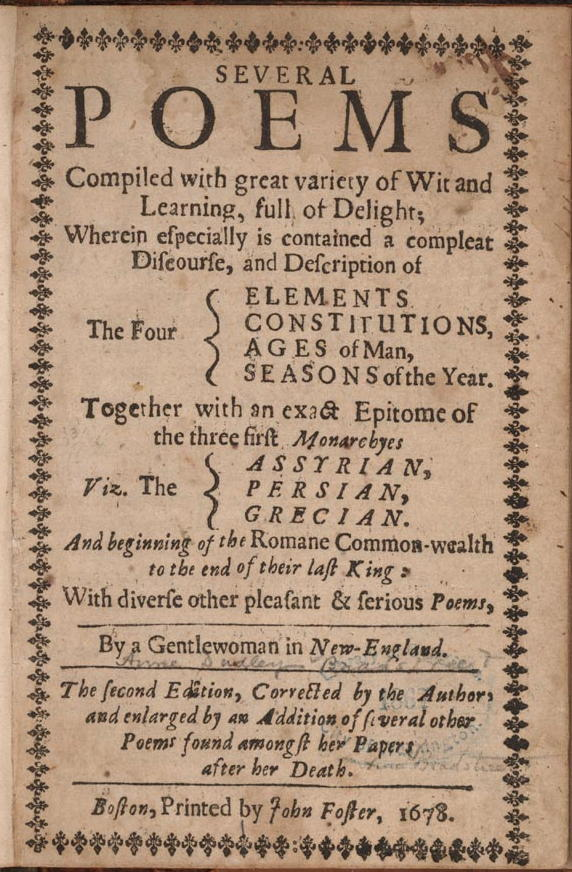
The Foure Monarchies was the title of a long poem by Anne Bradstreet from 1650. Title page of the 1678 edition of her poems.

A series of Protestant theologians, such as Jerome Zanchius (1516–1590), Joseph Mede (1586–1639), and John Lightfoot (1602–1675), particularly emphasized the eschatological theory of four monarchies. Mede and other writers (such as William Guild (1586–1657), Edward Haughton and Nathaniel Stephens (c. 1606–1678)) expected the imminent end of the fourth empire, and a new age. The early modern version of the four monarchies in universal history was subsequently often attributed to the chronologist and astrologer Johann Carion, based on his Chronika (1532). Developments of his Protestant world chronology were endorsed in an influential preface of Philipp Melanchthon (published 1557).

The theory was topical in the 1550s. Johann Sleidan in his De quatuor imperiis summis (1556) tried to summarise the status of the "four monarchies" as historical theory; he had already alluded to it in previous works. Sleidan's influential slant on the theory was both theological, with a Protestant tone of apocalyptic decline over time, and an appeal to German nationalist feeling in terms of translatio imperii. The Speculum coniugiorum (1556) of the jurist Alonso De la Vera Cruz, in New Spain, indirectly analysed the theory. It cast doubts on the Holy Roman Emperor's universal imperium by pointing out that the historical "monarchies" in question had in no case held exclusive sway. The Carion/Melanchthon view was that the Kingdom of Egypt must be considered a subsidiary power to Babylon: just as France was secondary compared to the Empire.

The Catholic Jean Bodin was concerned to argue against the whole theory of "four monarchies" as a historical paradigm. He devoted a chapter to refuting it, alongside the classical scheme of a Golden Age, in his 1566 Methodus ad facilem historiarum cognitionem.

In 1617, sculptures representing the four kingdoms of Daniel were placed above the doors of Nuremberg town hall:

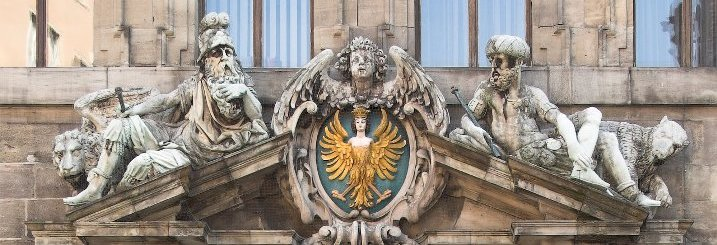
The lion represents the King of Babylon, Nebuchadnezzar. The bear represents the Persian King, Cyrus.

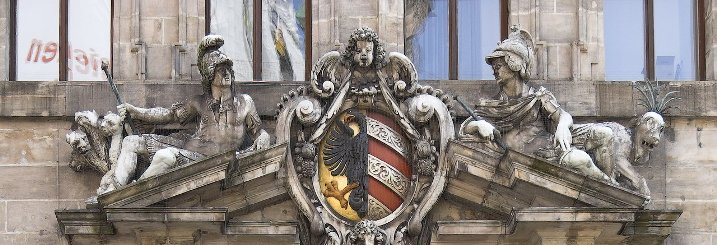
The leopard represents the King of the Greek Empire, Alexander. The fourth beast represents the Roman Empire, Julius Caesar.

=== Fifth Monarchists ===
In the conditions leading to the English Civil War of 1642–1651 and in the disruption that followed, many Englishmen advanced millennarian ideas, believing they were living in the "end of days". The Fifth Monarchists were a significant element of the Parliamentary grouping and, in January 1661, after Charles II had taken the throne following the English Restoration of 1660, 50 militant Fifth Monarchists under Thomas Venner attempted to take over London to start the "Fifth Monarchy of King Jesus". After the failure of this uprising, Fifth Monarchists became a quiescent and devotional part of religious dissent.
