= Daniel's final vision =

Chapters 10, 11 and 12 in the Book of Daniel

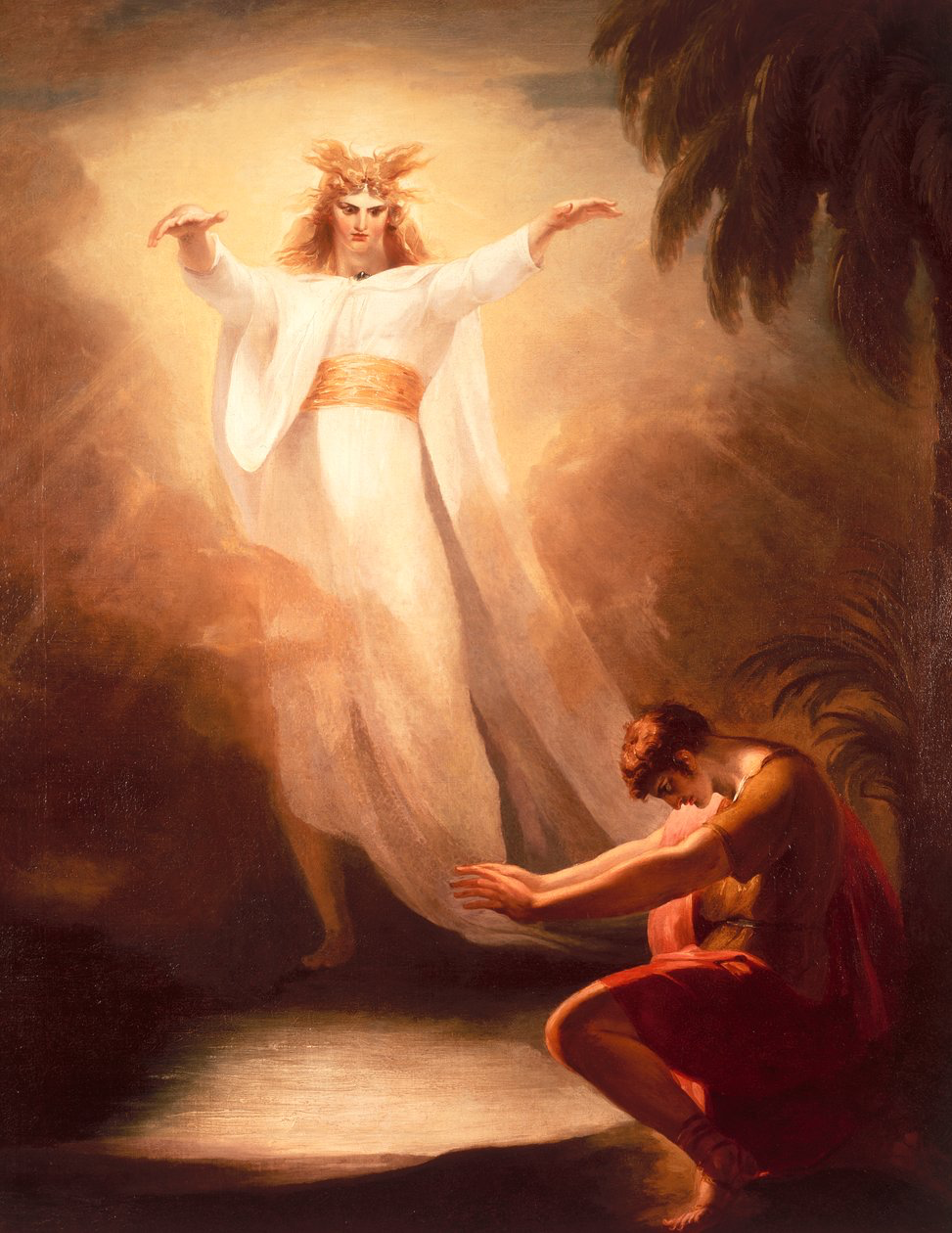
The Vision of Daniel by William Hamilton, depicting the prophet kneeling before the "man clothed in linen".

Chapters 10, 11, and 12 of the Book of Daniel in the Hebrew Bible and the Christian Old Testament comprise Daniel's final vision. The vision describes a series of coming conflicts between an unnamed "King of the North" and a "King of the South", ultimately leading to the "time of the end", when Israel will be vindicated. The dead will be raised: some to everlasting life, some to shame and everlasting contempt.

Some historians claim that, although set during the 6th century BC, the Book of Daniel was written in reaction to the persecution of the Jews by the Greek king Antiochus IV Epiphanes in 167–164 BC. Its authors were the maskilim (the "wise"), of whom Daniel is one: "Those among the people who are wise shall make many understand ..." Its fundamental theme is God's control over history. The climax comes with the prophecy of the resurrection of the dead. Daniel 7 speaks of the kingdom of the saints or "holy ones" of the Most High, but Daniel 10–12 does not say that history will end with the coming of the Jewish kingdom; instead, the "wise" will be brought back to life to lead Israel in the new kingdom of God.

In contemporary Christian millennialism, Daniel 11:36–45 is interpreted as a prophecy of the career and destruction of the Antichrist; Daniel 12 is interpreted as concerning the salvation of Israel and the coming kingdom of Jesus.

== Summary ==
Chapter 10, a prologue: In the third year of Cyrus (the Persian conqueror of Babylon), after fasting for three weeks, Daniel sees a vision of a man clothed in linen, clearly a supernatural being, who tells him that he is currently engaged in a battle with the "prince of Persia", in which he is assisted by "Michael, your prince". He must soon return to the combat, but first he will tell Daniel what is written in the "book of truth".

Chapter 11, the report of the vision: The angel continues: there will be four kings of Persia, and the last will make war on Greece. After him will come a great king, but that king's empire will be broken up. There will be wars and marriages between the kings of the South and the North (described in great detail), and the king of the North will desecrate the Temple and set up "the abomination that causes desolation". At the end-time there will be a war between the king of the South and the king of the North, and the king of the North will meet his end "between the sea and the Holy Mountain".

Chapter 12, the epilogue: At the end-time, "Michael, the great prince who protects your people, will arise." There will be great distress, but those whose names are written will be saved, the dead will awaken to everlasting shame or life. Daniel is instructed to seal the book until the time of the end. He asks how long it will be before these things are fulfilled and is told, "From the time that the daily sacrifice is abolished and the abomination that causes desolation is set up, there will be 1,290 days; blessed is the one who waits for and reaches the end of the 1,335 days". At the end of the vision, Daniel is told "Go your way", and promised his inheritance at the end of days.

== Composition ==
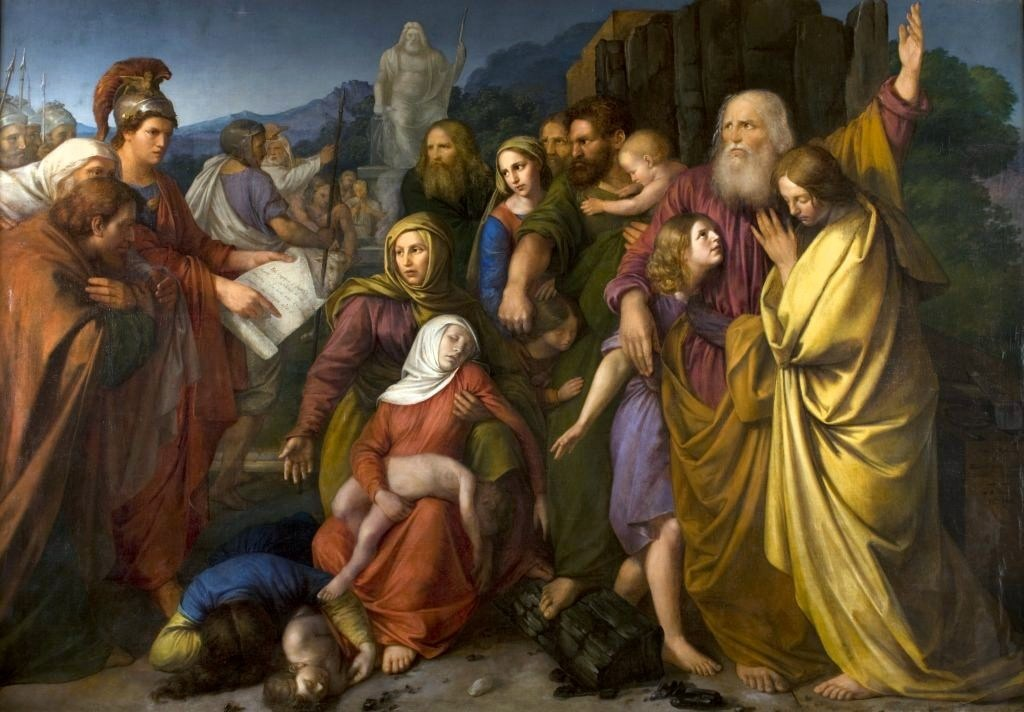
Wojciech Stattler, "Machabeusze" ("The Maccabees"), 1844

It is generally accepted by modern scholars that the Daniel who appears as the hero of the Book of Daniel never existed, but that the authors reveal their true identity at the end of Daniel 12: they are the maskil, the "wise", of whom Daniel is one: "Those among the people who are wise shall make many understand ...". The actual background to the book was the persecution of the Jews by the Greek king Antiochus IV Epiphanes in 167–164 BC, and there is a broad consensus that the book was completed shortly after that crisis ended.

The first six chapters are folktales dating from the late Persian/early Hellenistic period, while the visions of chapters 7–12 date from between 167 and 164. A probable outline of the composition is as follows:

- An original collection of folktales, currently chapters 1–6;
- Addition of chapter 7 and revision of the earlier chapters;
- Further revision and the addition of chapters 8–12.

Daniel is episodic rather than linear: it has no plot as such. It does, however, have a structure. Chapters 2–7 form a chiasm, a literary figure in which elements mirror each other: chapter 2 is the counterpart of chapter 7, chapter 3 of chapter 6, and chapter 4 of chapter 5, with the second member of each pair advancing the first in some way. Daniel 8 is then a new beginning, and the single vision contained in chapters 10–12 advances that argument further and gives it more precision.

Within the three chapters of Daniel 10–12, Daniel 10 serves as prologue, chapter 11 as the report of the angelic vision, and chapter 12 as the epilogue. P. R. Davies suggests that the text is "poor Hebrew, and may represent a rather poor translation from an Aramaic original". The unit begins with a third-person introduction (10:1), and then switches to Daniel speaking in his own voice as one of the two primary characters, his angelic partner being the second—this is probably the angel Gabriel, although he is never identified.

Then follows Daniel 11, the "Book of Truth", where although the message of the book wasn't dependent on historical accuracy, much of the history it recounts is accurate down to the two successive Syrian invasions of Egypt in 170 and 168 BC, but there was no third war between Egypt and Syria, and Antiochus did not die in Palestine. These discrepancies place the date of composition for Daniel between 167-163 BC. The countdown of days remaining to the end-time in Daniel 12:11–12 differs from that in Daniel 8: it was most likely added after the original prediction failed to come to pass, although it could also be understood by the author's use of competing calendars.

== Genre and themes ==
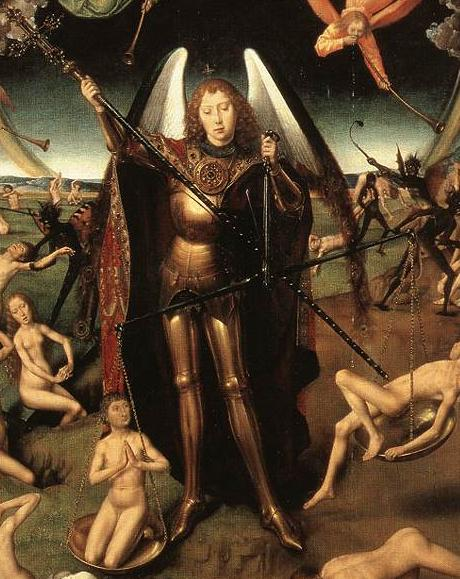
The Archangel Michael weighing souls on Judgement Day. Hans Memling, 15th century.

The vision is an apocalypse in the form of an epiphany (appearance of a divine being) with an angelic discourse (revelation delivered by an angel) wherein a review of history is written in the guise of prophecy. The discourse forms an ex eventu (after the event) prophecy, with close parallels with certain Babylonian works. The only true prophecy is the prediction of the death of Antiochus, which is probably based on Ezekiel's prophecy of Gog and Magog. The heroes of Daniel 11–12, the "wise", are based on the "Suffering Servant" of Isaiah 53. Thus, based on the scriptures, Daniel paints an imaginative scenario of the kind of issue that God will ensure will come from present events and not a literal account of events before they take place and the book's theological message was not necessarily dependent on historical accuracy.

The fundamental theme of the Book of Daniel is God's control over history. According to Deuteronomy 32:8–9 God assigned each nation its own divine patron; originally these were subordinate gods, but by the time Daniel came to be written they had been redefined as angels. In Daniel, Michael, the angel of Israel, is in battle with the "prince (i.e., angelic patron) of Persia", and this will be followed by further battle with the "prince of Greece"; the theological point being made is that the fate of nations is decided in heaven, not on earth. The same theme underlies the reference to the heavenly "Book of Truth" which is about to be revealed to Daniel, and which supposedly forms the content of chapter 11: both the past and the future are written already, and God is sovereign over all.

The constant preoccupation of the vision chapters is Antiochus's replacement of the "tamid", the twice-daily burnt offering to the God of Israel, by the "abomination of desolation". (Note: The tamid offering was a lamb accompanied by fine flour, oil and wine, burnt in the morning and the evening. See Lust, 2002, p.672. The exact nature of the "abomination" is somewhat mysterious, but it was clearly a blasphemous pagan disruption of the worship of the God of Israel, possibly involving the sacrifice of swine.) The predicted reversal of the blasphemy will usher in the end of history, the theme of the four earthly kingdoms first introduced in Daniel 2 and developed in Daniel 7 and 8; they will be replaced by the Kingdom of Heaven, a kingdom in which Israel will be given domination over the world.

The climax comes with the prophecy of the resurrection of the dead and although Daniel exhibits a clear belief in resurrection, the context of chapter 12 is an imaginative portrayal of the movement "from dust to kingship" of the covenant people and need not be read as a literal prediction. Prior to the Babylonian exile, all the dead went to Sheol, irrespective of their good or bad deeds, but the idea that the righteous would be rewarded and the wicked punished began to appear in the 3rd century, and is clearly expressed in Daniel 12:2–3: "Many of those who sleep in the dust of the earth shall awake..." (although the "many" implies that not all will be resurrected). (Note: The vision of the Valley of Dry Bones in Ezekiel 37:1–14 does not refer to individual resurrection but to the restoration of the nation of Israel – see Towner, p.166.) Chapter 7 spoke of the coming "kingdom of heaven", but Daniel 10–12 does not say that history will end with the coming of the Jewish kingdom.

== Historical background ==
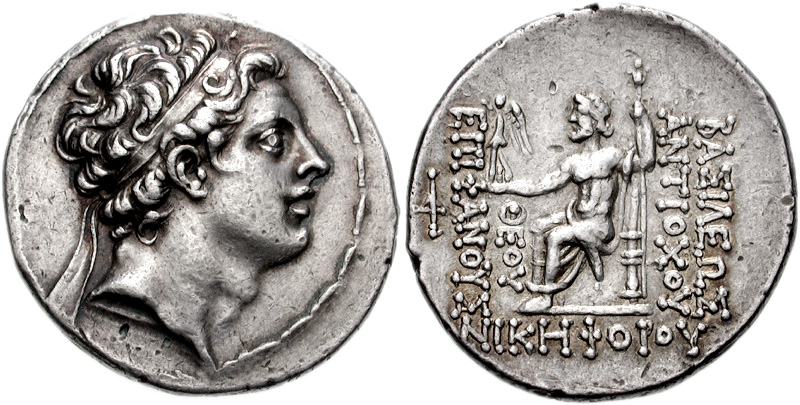
Coin of Antiochus IV Epiphanes. The reverse shows Zeus (King of the Gods) enthroned carrying the Goddess Nike(Victory).

Daniel's final vision is set in "the third year of Cyrus, king of Persia": this marks 70 years since Daniel's own captivity began (606 BC), and thus the fulfillment of Jeremiah's prophecy that the exile would last 70 years. Chapter 11, the centre-piece of the revelation, gives a broad sweep of history from the 6th century BC to the 2nd, but the coverage is uneven: two centuries of Persian history plus Alexander the Great's conquests and the breakup of his empire, over two and a half centuries of history, are covered in three verses (2–4), but the century and a half of wars between the Ptolemies of Egypt and the Seleucids of Syria receive 16 verses (5–20), and the reign of Antiochus IV Epiphanes, which lasted less than ten years, gets 25 (21–45).

Verses 20–39, the bulk of the historically accurate verses, deal with Antiochus, who reigned 175–164 BC. Verse 21 describes him as "the contemptible person to whom royal majesty has not been given", meaning that he came to the throne by questionable means. Verse 22 notes his removal of the High Priest Onias III, (Antiochus sold the priesthood twice over, first to a relative of Onias named Jason, and then to a rival of Jason's named Menelaus), and verses 23–24 apparently refer to his liberality in scattering the spoils among his supporters. Verses 25–28 describe his first war with Egypt, in 170 BC, in which he was largely but not entirely successful. In 169, on his way back to Syria, he stopped in Jerusalem to plunder the Temple (verse 28).

In 168 Antiochus invaded Egypt again, but this time he was stopped by the Romans (the "ships of Kittim") and forced to retreat (verses 29–30). (Note: Kittim: originally the town of Kition (now Larnaca) in Cyprus, but applied to the Greeks and Romans; the same verse mentions Ashur, meaning Syria, and Eber, meaning Palestine.) Verses 30–31 describe the events that followed: passing once more through Jerusalem, Antiochus instituted a persecution of Jewish customs and religion, desecrated the Temple, and established a garrison there. Verses 32–39 describe the response of "the wise" (the group associated with the Book of Daniel) and "the many" (the population at large): the wise suffer and die so that the many will understand. In time the faithful receive "a little help" (possibly, but not certainly, a reference to Judas Maccabeus, who led an armed revolt against the Greeks). Verses 36–39 appear to carry Antiochus' history to the cosmic plane, detailing the blasphemy of the tyrant who considered himself a demi-god. He "spoke astonishing things against the God of gods" and gave "no heed to the god of his fathers".

Verses 40–45 finish the chapter with the prophecy that the unnamed king would make war once again against many, and would die without support. In Antiochus' case, there was no third war with Egypt and he died in Persia or in Babylon. Alternatively, a minority of scholars suggests that these verses may be summarizing Antiochus's first two Egyptian campaigns (rather than predicting a third), and that the "end" referred to in Daniel 11:45 is not the death of Antiochus IV Epiphanes, but rather the conclusion of his oppression and the decline of Seleucid dominance—marked by the Jewish victory at the Battle of Emmaus, fought between Jerusalem and the sea.

== See also ==
- John's vision of the Son of Man
- Abomination of desolation
- Apocalypticism
- Book of Daniel
- Eschatology
- Vaticinium ex eventu
