= Daniel 8 =

Eighth chapter of the Book of Daniel

Daniel 8 is the eighth chapter of the Book of Daniel. It tells of Daniel's vision of a two-horned ram destroyed by a one-horned goat, followed by the history of the "little horn", which is Daniel's code-word for the Greek king Antiochus IV Epiphanes.

Although set during the reign or regency of King Belshazzar (who probably died in 539 BCE), the subject of the vision is Antiochus's oppression of the Jewish people during the second century BCE: he outlawed Jewish traditions such as circumcision, the Three Pilgrimage Festivals, dietary law (Kashrut), and Shabbat, (Note: Known as Chodesh, Millah, Shabbos) made ownership of a Sefer Torah a capital offense, and built an altar to Zeus in the Temple in Jerusalem (the "abomination of desolation"). His program sparked a popular uprising that led to the retaking of Jerusalem and the Temple by Judas Maccabeus (164 BCE), an event described in 1 Maccabees.

== Summary ==
In the third year of Belshazzar, king of Babylon, Daniel in a vision sees himself in Susa, which is in Elam, in modern-day western Iran. In his vision he sees a ram with two horns, one greater than the other; the ram charges to the west, north and south, and no other beast can stand against it. Daniel then sees a male goat with a single horn come from the west without touching the ground; it strikes the ram and destroys it. At the height of his power the goat's horn is broken and in its place four horns grow. One of the horns is small but grows great and prospers in everything it does, throwing stars down to the earth, stopping the daily sacrifice, destroying the sanctuary and throwing truth to the ground. Daniel is told the vision will be fulfilled in 2,300 evenings and mornings, when the sanctuary will be cleansed. The angel Gabriel appears and tells Daniel that this is a vision about the time of the end.

== Composition and structure ==
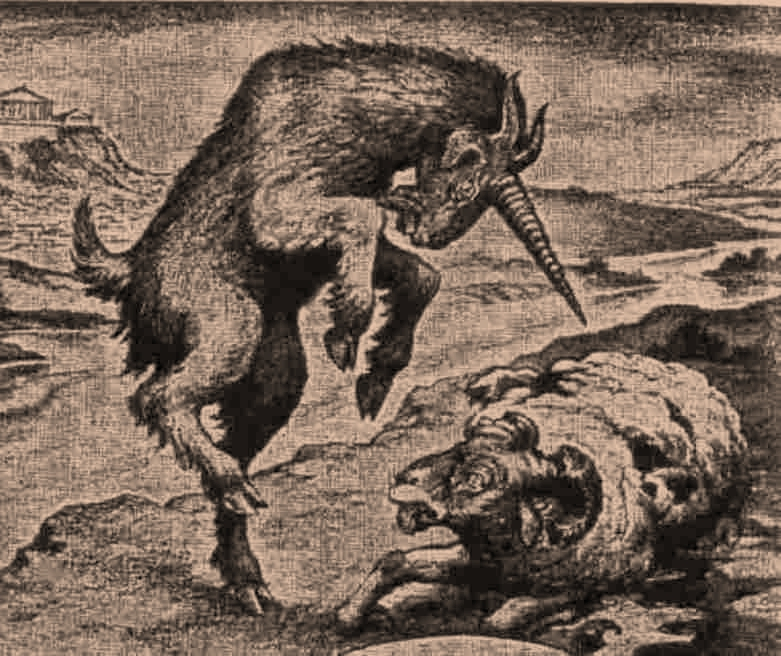
The ram and the goat.

The Book of Daniel originated as a collection of folktales among the Jewish community in Babylon and Mesopotamia in the Persian and early Hellenistic periods (5th to 3rd centuries BCE), and was later expanded by the visions of chapters 7–12 in the Maccabean era (mid-2nd century). Daniel is a legendary figure and his name was presumably chosen for the hero of the book because of his reputation as a wise seer in Hebrew tradition. The structure of the chapter can be described as follows:
I. Introduction: date and place (verses 1–2);
II. Vision report: ram, he-goat, angelic conversation (3–12);
III. Epiphany (appearance) of interpreter: circumstances and desire for interpretation, epiphany (15–17);
IV. Interpretation: circumstances, interpretation of images, concluding statement by the angel (18–26);
V. Concluding statement of visionary's reaction, v.27.

== Genre and themes ==
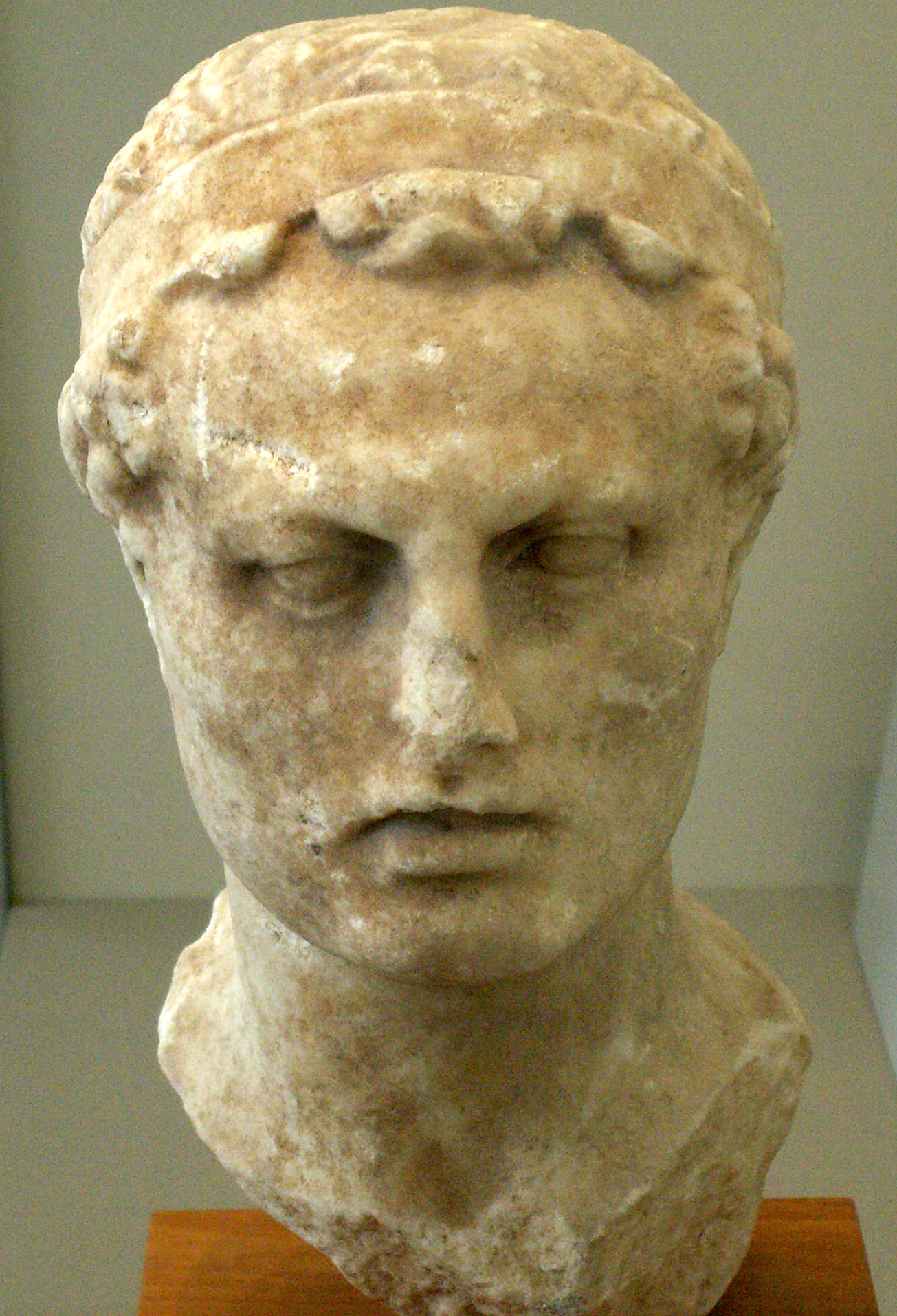
Antiochus IV Epiphanes – Altes Museum, Berlin.

The Book of Daniel is an apocalypse, a literary genre in which a heavenly reality is revealed to a human recipient; such works are characterized by visions, symbolism, an other-worldly mediator, an emphasis on cosmic events, angels and demons, and pseudonymity (false authorship). Apocalypses were common from 300 BCE to 100 CE, not only among Jews and Christians, but Greeks, Romans, Persians and Egyptians. Daniel, the book's hero, is a representative apocalyptic seer, the recipient of the divine revelation: has learned the wisdom of the Babylonian magicians and surpassed them, because his God is the true source of knowledge; he is one of the maskil, the wise, whose task is to teach righteousness. The book is also an eschatology, meaning a divine revelation concerning the end of the present age, a moment in which God will intervene in history to usher in the final kingdom.

Daniel 8 conforms to the type of the "symbolic dream vision" and the "regnal" or "dynastic" prophecy, analogous to a work called the "Babylonian Dynastic Prophecy"–a more extensive example appears in Daniel 11. For its sources it draws on Daniel 7, which supplies the symbolism of the "little horn" and the "holy ones" (angels), as well as on the Book of Ezekiel, which provides the location by a river and the epiphany of the angel, and on the Book of Habakkuk with its concern with the "end of time." The "little horn" which casts some of the stars to the ground recalls Isaiah 14:12 and Lucifer, which in turn presupposes the Ugaritic (Canaanite) myth of Attar's attempt to take the throne of Baal.

Chapter 8 is about the actions of the world-powers at the "end-time". The course of history is pre-determined, and Antiochus is merely playing a role in the unwinding of God's plan. Daniel 8 is thus a reinterpretation and expansion of Daniel 7: where chapter 7 spoke only cryptically of the change-over from the Medo-Persian empire to the age of the Greek kings, chapter 8 makes this explicit; by the same token, chapter 8 speaks cryptically of the "little horn," whose story will be taken up in detail in the following chapters.

== Interpretation ==
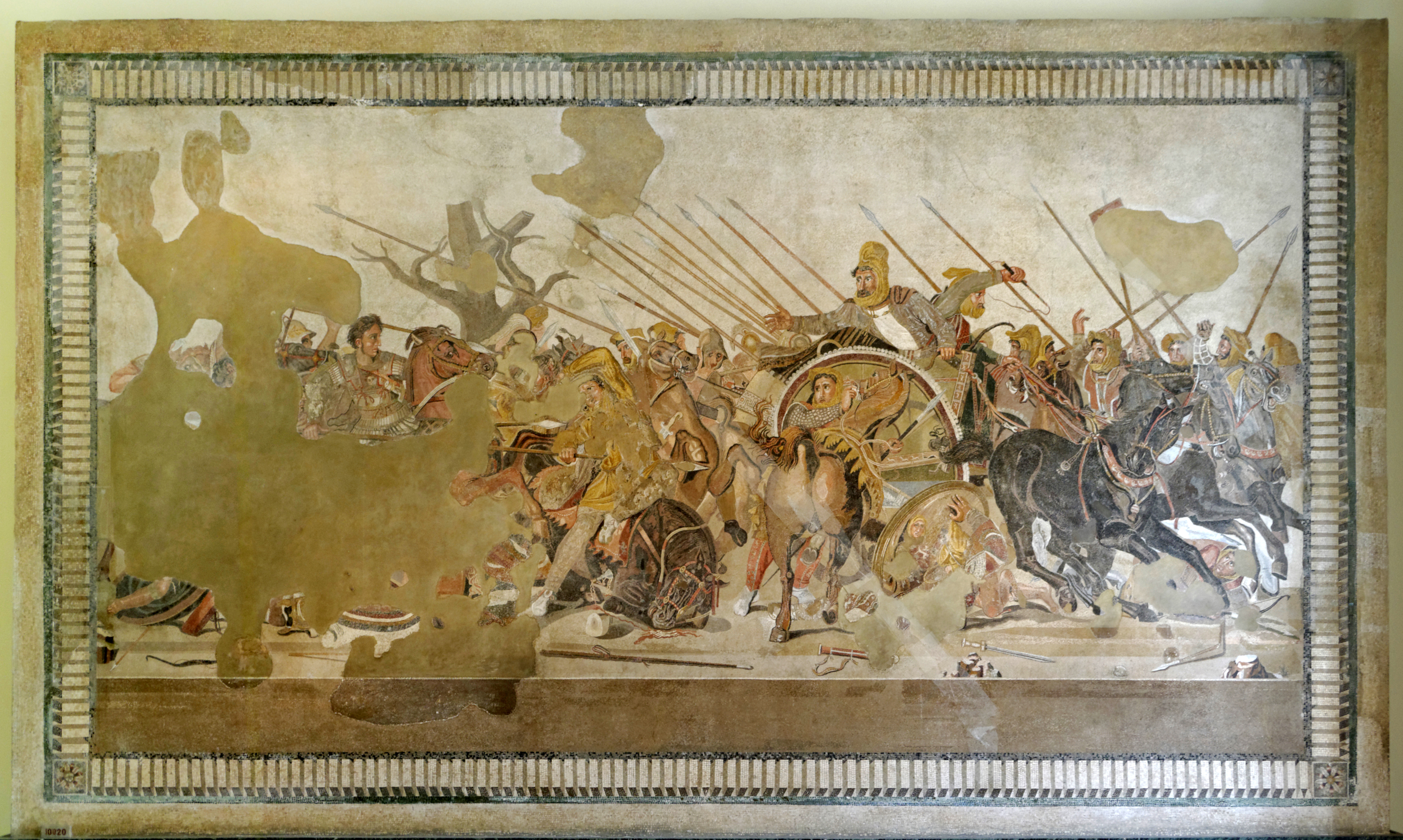
The Alexander Mosaic depicting Darius III of Persia fleeing before Alexander the Great at the Battle of Issus in 333 BC.

=== Historical background ===
Daniel 8 is an interpretation of the author's own time, 167–164 BCE, with a claim that God will bring to an end the oppression of the Jewish people. It begins with the conquest of the Achaemenid Empire, touches on the rise of the four Greek successor kingdoms, and then focuses on the career of Antiochus IV Epiphanes, who took the throne of the Seleucid Empire in 175 BCE. Antiochus found himself in conflict with the Jews, and while the details are obscure, it appears that there was a revolt in Jerusalem, he sent troops to suppress it, and as a result the daily sacrifice in the Second Temple was stopped and the Temple itself defiled. The date for this is usually 167 BCE. The attempt to wipe out traditional religion and culture inevitably provoked a reaction, and the rebels led by Judas Maccabee and his brothers, won sufficient military victories over the Seleucids to take back and purify the temple three years later.

=== The ram, the he-goat, the great horn and the four new horns ===
The symbols of the ram and he-goat, explained in the text of Daniel 8 as representing the kings of Persia and Greece, are drawn from the constellations that preside over Persia and Syria in Hellenistic astrology. Scholars agree that the goat's first horn, which is broken, is Alexander the Great, and the four horns which then arise are the four generals who divided his empire. The detail that the goat does not touch the ground as he attacks the ram may reflect the speed of Alexander's conquest.

=== The "little horn" and his war on God ===
The "little horn" which arises from the four horns is Antiochus Epiphanes. It "grows in power to the south and to the east and towards the beautiful land", reflecting Antiochus' campaigns in Egypt (169–168 BCE), Persia (166 BCE) and Israel (the "beautiful land"). "Truth was flung to the ground" by the little horn as it tramples the land: this is probably a reference to the Torah, the Law of Moses.

Daniel 8:13's "holy ones" most likely means angels, rather than saints, as in the King James Version. Sometimes in the Hebrew Bible it seems to refer to the Israelites. Stars were commonly identified with angels in ancient Israel, and in 8:10 the reader is told that the little horn "grew great ... and some of the host of the stars it cast down to the ground and trampled upon them", indicating that Antiochus fights against the "heavenly host" of God's angels. Indeed, he "aspired to be as great as the Prince of the host," God himself.

Daniel is the only book in the Hebrew Bible which gives names to angels. Gabriel may have received his because he "has the appearance of a man" (Hebrew gaber); he appears here as a messenger and interpreter of God's message, the same role he was later given by the author of Luke's annunciation scene (Luke 1:19,26). Michael is depicted as Israel's guardian angel and a warrior. The prominence given these divine beings in Daniel is typical of Hellenistic Jewish literature, but much more restricted than in contemporary works such as First Enoch.

=== The 2,300 evenings and mornings ===
In verse 13 Daniel overhears two "holy ones" (angels). One asks" "For how long is this vision concerning the regular burnt offering, the transgression that makes desolate, and the giving over the sanctuary and host to be trampled?" and Daniel is informed that it will be "for 2,300 evenings and mornings," or 1,150 days. This is contradicted (twice in one sentence) at the end of Daniel 12, which says that "from the time the regular burnt offering is taken away ... there shall be 1,290 days; happy are those that persevere and attain the 1,335 days" (Daniel 12:11–12): the different numbers, first 1,150 days, then 1,290, finally 1,335, are presumably revisions made when the earlier numbers passed without fulfillment although the contradiction could also be understood by the author's use of different competing calendars.

The period in question was initially the duration of the desecration of the Temple, but 1,150 days is slightly less than three and a half years, while the desecration lasted only three years. It seems likely that the focus of the author shifted from the desecration and re-dedication of the Temple to the end of history, which would be marked by the resurrection of the dead: the final number in Daniel 12:12 is followed by the instruction to Daniel to "go your way and rest; you shall rise for your reward at the end of days."

The interpretation of the 2,300 evenings and mornings as equivalent to half that number of days–1150 days–appears to be the most common, but C. L. Seow, a leading Daniel scholar, takes it to mean 2,300 full days. This would be equivalent to about seven years; assuming that the end-point is the re-dedication of the Temple and restoration of sacrifices in 164 BCE, the starting point would then be the murder of the high priest Onias III in 171 BCE, another notable year in the events leading up to the desecration.

== Christian eschatological readings ==
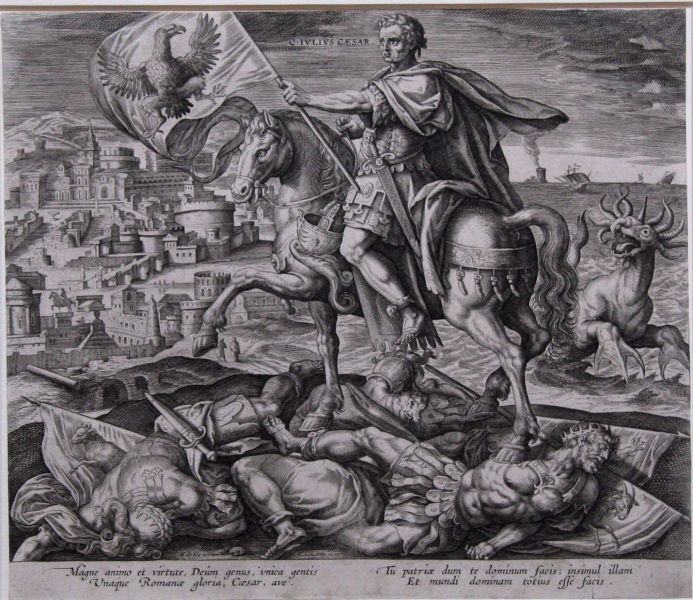
Julius Caesar identified as the king in Daniel 8:23–25, depicted in armour and with a laurel wreath, on horseback, bearing a standard depicting an eagle; the horse trampling three kings with standards depicting a lion, a ram and a goat. Engraving by Adriaen Collaert, Plate 4 of Four Illustrious Rulers of Antiquity.

The Book of Daniel, and along with Revelation, formed one of the foundations of Christian eschatology. The authors of the Gospels identified Jesus with Daniel 7's "one like a son of man", and by the 3rd century CE the stone of Daniel 2 and the fourth figure in the furnace in Daniel 3 were interpreted as Christ, the fourth kingdom of Daniel 7 was Rome, and the "little horn" was the Antichrist (his identification as Antiochus was denied by Jerome in a famous exchange with the pagan philosopher Porphyry). Daniel's timetable was reinterpreted to fit Christian expectations: the prophecy of 70 weeks in Daniel 9:20–27, for example, was commonly held to end either with the life and death of Christ or with the destruction of Jerusalem in 70 CE.

In the Middle Ages dissident Catholics, and later Martin Luther, identified the pope as the Antichrist, while the "little horn" included Mohammed, Antiochus, and the papacy, depending on which chapter of Daniel involved. In the 17th century the English Puritans interpreted their struggle in terms of God's army (themselves) battling the Antichrist (the pope) and his ally (the king), and the Fifth Monarchy Men took their name and ideal of government from Daniel 7.

== See also ==
- Abomination of desolation
- Day-year principle
- Four kingdoms of Daniel
