= Abomination of desolation =

Apocalyptic biblical phrase in the Book of Daniel

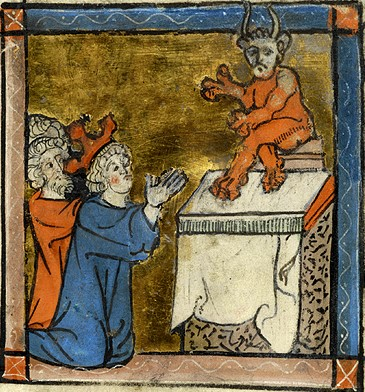
A 14th-century Christian work depicting Antiochus IV praying to a horned idol at the Temple. The Book of Daniel describes an "abomination of desolation" being given authority over the Temple, as well as the daily offering and sacrifice ceasing.

"Abomination of desolation" (Note: Biblical Hebrew: שִׁקּוּץ מְשֹׁמֵם, romanized: Šiqquṣ məšomēm, Koine Greek: τὸ βδέλυγμα τῆς ἐρημώσεως, romanized: to bdelygma tēs erēmōseōs, Latin: abominatio desolationis) is a phrase from Daniel's final vision in the Hebrew Bible (Daniel 11:31), which was later identified with the pagan sacrifices with which the 2nd century BC Seleucid Emperor Antiochus IV Epiphanes replaced the twice-daily qorban in the Second Temple, or the altar of sacrifice on which such offerings were made.

In the 1st century, it was taken up by the authors of the gospels in the context of the Roman destruction of Jerusalem and the Temple in the year 70, with the Gospel of Mark placing the "abomination of desolation" into a speech by Jesus concerning the Second Coming. It is widely accepted that Mark was the primary source used by the authors of the Gospel of Matthew and of Luke for their parallel passages, with Matthew 24:15–16 adding a reference to Daniel and Luke 21:20–21 describing the Roman armies ("But when you see Jerusalem surrounded by armies..."); in all three the authors likely had in mind a future eschatological (i.e., end-time) event, and perhaps the activities of some antichrist.

== Book of Daniel ==
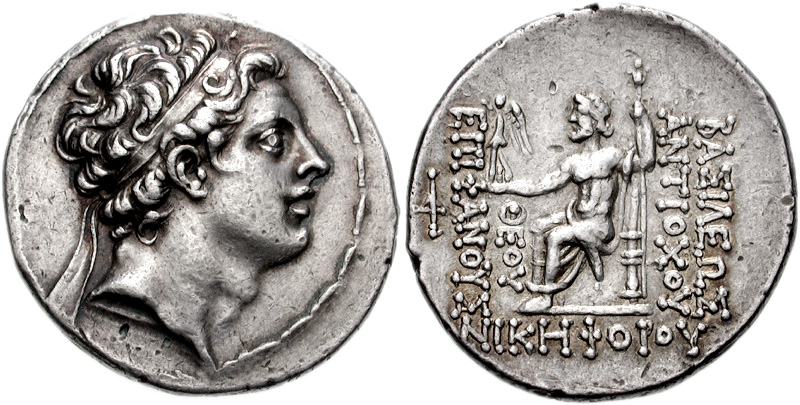
Silver coin of king Antiochus IV. Reverse shows seated Zeus holding Nike and scepter. Greek inscription reads: ΒΑΣΙΛΕΩΣ ΑΝΤΙΟΧΟΥ ΝΙΚΗΦΟΡΟΥ ΘΕΟΥ ΕΠΙΦΑΝΟΥΣ, Basileōs Antiochou Nikēphorou Theou Epiphanous, "of victorious god manifest king Antiochus."

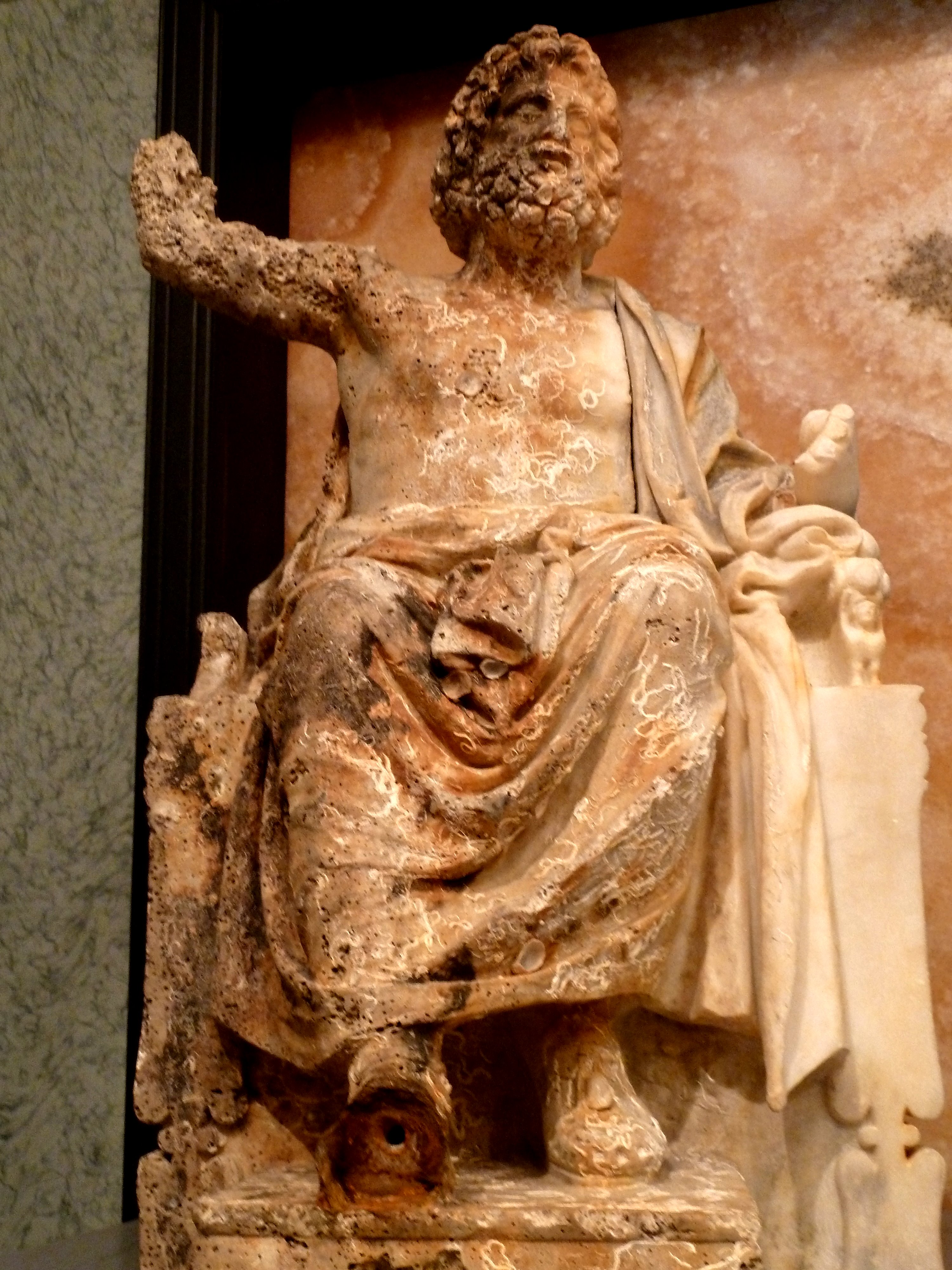
Enthroned Zeus (Greek, c. 100 BCE)

Chapters 1–6 of the Book of Daniel originated as a collection of oral literature from Hellenistic Palestine in the late 4th to early 3rd centuries BCE. At that time, a lamb was sacrificed twice daily, in the morning and the evening, on the altar of the Temple in Jerusalem. In 167 BCE, Antiochus IV Epiphanes, the Seleucid emperor, who then ruled Palestine, ended the practice. In reaction to this, the visionary chapters of Daniel, chapters 7–12, were added to reassure Jews that they would survive in the face of this threat. In Daniel 8, one angel asks another how long "the transgression that makes desolate" will last. The Prophecy of Seventy Weeks (Daniel 9) tells of "the prince who is to come" who "shall make sacrifice and offering cease, and in their place shall be an abomination that desolates." Daniel's final vision appears in Daniel 11, where it tells the history of the arrogant foreign king who sets up the "abomination that makes desolate,"; and in Daniel 12, where the prophet is told how many days will pass "from the time that the regular burnt offering is taken away and the abomination that desolates is set up."

One of the more popular older views was to see in the "abomination" a contemptuous deformation (or dysphemism) of the Canaanite deity Baalshamin "Lord of Heaven"; Philo of Byblos identified Baalshamin with Zeus, and as the Temple was rededicated in honour of Zeus according to 2 Maccabees 6:2, older commentators tended to follow Porphyry of Tyre in seeing the "abomination" in terms of a statue of Zeus. More recently, it has been suggested that the reference is to baetyls, possibly of meteoric origin, that were fixed to the altar of sacrifice for worship, since the use of such stones is well-attested in Canaanite and Syrian cults. Both proposals have been criticized on the basis that they are too speculative, dependent on flawed analysis, or not well-suited to the relevant context in the Book of Daniel; and more recent scholarship tends to see the "abomination" as a reference to either the pagan offerings that replaced the forbidden twice-daily Jewish offering (cf. Daniel 11:31, 12:11; 2 Maccabees 6:5), or the pagan altar on which such offerings were made.

== New Testament ==
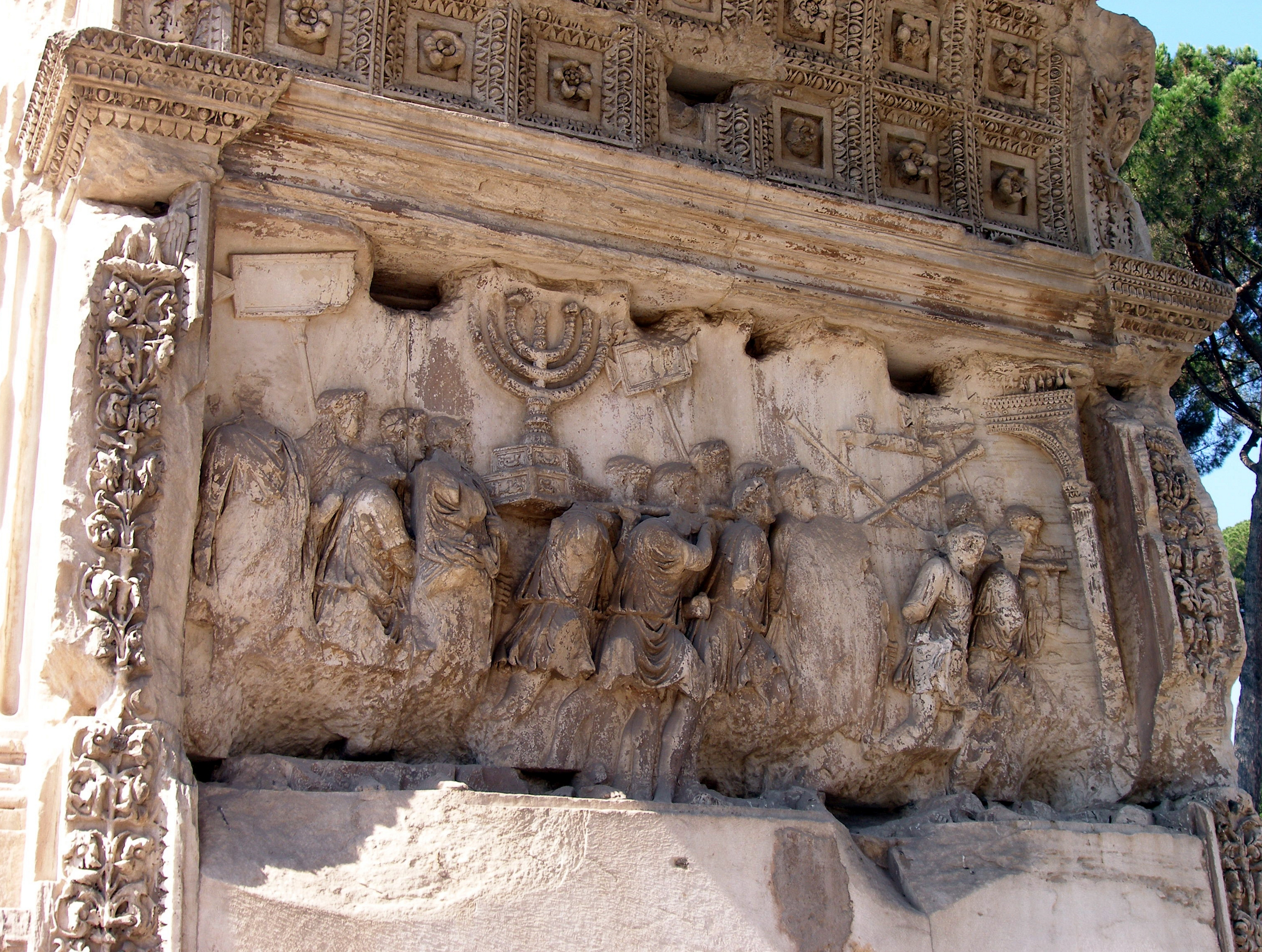
Arch of Titus (81 CE) in Rome, showing spoils from the Second Temple

In 63 BCE, when the Roman Republic captured Jerusalem, Judea became a client state of Rome for the remainder of Hasmonean and later Herodian rule, and eventually became a province of the Roman Empire. In 66 CE, the Jews rose in revolt in the First Jewish–Roman War. The war ended in 70 CE when the legions of the Roman general Titus surrounded and eventually captured Jerusalem; the city and the Temple were razed to the ground, and the only habitation on the site until the first third of the next century was a castrum. It was against this background that the gospels were written; the Gospel of Mark around 70 and Matthew and Luke around 80–85. The secular scholars believe that none of the authors were eyewitnesses to the life of Jesus, and that Mark was the source used by the authors of Matthew and Luke for their "abomination of desolation" passages.

Chapter 13 of the Gospel of Mark is a speech of Jesus concerning the return of the son of man and the advent of the Kingdom of God, which will be signalled by the appearance of the "abomination of desolation". It begins with Jesus in the temple informing his disciples that "not one stone here will be left on another, all will be thrown down"; the disciples ask when this will happen, and in Mark 13:15, Jesus tells them: "[W]hen you see the abomination of desolation standing where he ought not to be (let the reader understand), then let those who are in Judea flee to the mountains" Mark's terminology is drawn from Daniel, but the author places the fulfilment of the prophecy in the coming days, underlining this in Mark 13:30 by stating that "this generation will not pass away before all these things take place." While Daniel's "abomination" was probably a pagan altar or sacrifice, Mark uses a masculine participle for "standing", indicating a concrete historical person: several candidates have been suggested, but the most likely is Titus. (Note: Other candidates have included the Zealots who occupied the temple and slaughtered the priests in 67–68 CE, and the Roman armies, the eagle standards to which they offered sacrifices.)

The majority of scholars believe that Mark was the source used by the authors of Matthew and Luke for their "abomination of desolation" passages. Matthew 24:15–16 follows Mark 13:14 closely: "So when you see the abomination of desolation spoken of by the prophet Daniel, standing in the holy place (let the reader understand), then let those who are in Judea flee to the mountains"; but unlike Mark, Matthew uses a neutral participle instead of a masculine one, and explicitly identifies Daniel as the text's prophetic source. Luke 21:20–21 drops the "abomination" entirely: "But when you see Jerusalem surrounded by armies, then know that its desolation has come near. Then let those who are in Judea flee to the mountains, and let those who are inside the city depart, and let not those who are out in the country enter it." In all three, the authors likely had in mind a future eschatological (i.e., end-time) event, and perhaps the activities of some antichrist.

== Esoteric interpretations ==
"Abomination of desolation" is an expression found in Matthew 24:15 and Mark 13:14 that refers to an abominable stele of Daniel 8:13, Daniel 9:27, Daniel 11:31 and Daniel 12:11 (see Prophecy of Seventy Weeks).

This expression refers to the transgression of the Law of Moses by the Jews when they were being taken captive to Babylon. The graven image mentioned in the Old Testament is called a stele by ancient peoples, such as the Egyptians, and were usually funerary tablets that pagan peoples made for their gods.

God's people were serving stelae (graven images) and serving other pagan gods such as the queen of heaven in the Babylonian captivity. Both the prophets Daniel and Jesus warned the Israelites of their turning away from God and of the End Times, as in the Prophecy of Seventy Weeks, which is prophesied by the angel Gabriel of the coming of the Anti-Messiah, who after the 62 weeks would come to ravage humanity. There is also a meaning in esoteric occult circles, that the stele of Revelation, also known as the stele of Ankh-af-na-Khonsu, would be filled with prophecies of the Anti-Messiah, according to interpretations of the religion developed by Aleister Crowley, called Thelema.

According to the Bible in II Kings 23:13 and I Kings 11:5 one can find a close link between the concepts of idolatry and abomination.

In the circles of direct influence of the Book of Daniel, which are the same circles that gave rise to apocalyptic literature, the expression was used to designate an important eschatological conception. It is only in an eschatological sense that the expression can be adequately explained in the New Testament passages mentioned above.

According to some modern commentators, these passages are a “Jewish apocalypse”, which was reinterpreted by Christianity as a prophecy about the end times, when the Antichrist (abomination of desolation), will come to ravage the Earth and its inhabitants.

On the other hand, W. C. Allen maintains that the evangelists were referring to Caligula's desire to build a statue of himself in the Temple of Jerusalem.

== See also ==
- Related Bible sections: Daniel 7, Daniel 8, Daniel 11–12, 1 Maccabees 1, Matthew 24, Mark 13
- Abomination (Judaism)
- Apocalypticism
- Great Tribulation
- Last Judgment
- Maccabean revolt
- Mount of Temptation

== Bibliography ==
- Bloom, James J. (2014). The Jewish Revolts Against Rome, A.D. 66-135: A Military Analysis. McFarland. ISBN 9780786460205.
- Boyer, Paul (2009). When Time Shall Be No More: Prophecy Belief in Modern American Culture. Harvard University Press. ISBN 9780786460205.
- Collins, John J. (2013). "Daniel". In Lieb, Michael; Mason, Emma; Roberts, Jonathan (eds.). The Oxford Handbook of the Reception History of the Bible. OUP. ISBN 9780191649189.
- Collins, John J. (1993). Daniel. Fortress. ISBN 9780800660406.
- Davies, Philip (2006). "Apocalyptic". In Rogerson, J. W.; Lieu, Judith M. (eds.). The Oxford Handbook of Biblical Studies. OUP. ISBN 9780199254255.
- Davies, W. D.; Allison, Dale C. (1988). Matthew. Vol. 3: 19-28. A&C Black. ISBN 9780567085184.
- Goldingay, John (1989). Watts, John D.; Watts, James W.; Metzger, Bruce M. (eds.). Daniel. Word Biblical Commentary. Vol. 30. Thomas Nelson.
- Goldstein, Jonathan A. (1976). I Maccabees. The Anchor Yale Bible. Vol. 41. Doubleday.
- Hogeterp, Albert L.A. (2009). Expectations of the End. BRILL. ISBN 978-9004171770.
- Kimondo, Stephen Simon (2018). The Gospel of Mark and the Roman-Jewish War of 66–70 CE: Jesus' Story as a Contrast to the Events of the War. Wipf and Stock. ISBN 9781532653049.
- Lane, William L. (1974). The Gospel of Mark. Eerdmans. ISBN 9780802825025.
- Lust, Johan (2001). "Cult and Sacrifice in Daniel. The Tamid and the Abomination of Desolation". In Collins, John Joseph; Flint, Peter W. (eds.). The Book of Daniel: Composition and Reception. Vol. 2. BRILL. ISBN 9004122001.
- Perkins, Pheme (1998). "The Synoptic Gospels and the Acts of the Apostles". In Barton, John (ed.). The Cambridge Companion to Biblical Interpretation. Cambridge University Press. ISBN 9780521485937.
- Porteous, Norman W. (1965). Daniel: A Commentary. The Old Testament Library. Westminster John Knox Press.
- Reddish, Mitchell G. (2011). An Introduction to The Gospels. Abingdon Press. ISBN 9781426750083.
- Ryken, Leland; Wilhoit, James C.; Longman, Tremper (2010). "Abomination". Dictionary of Biblical Imagery. InterVarsity Press. ISBN 9780830867332.
- Schroter, Jens (2010). "The Gospel of Mark". In Aune, David E. (ed.). The Blackwell Companion to The New Testament. John Wiley & Sons. ISBN 9781444318944.
- Seow, Choon Leong (2003). Daniel. Westminster John Knox Press. ISBN 9780664256753.
- Waters, B. V. (2016). "The Two Eschatological Perspectives of the Book of Daniel". Scandinavian Journal of the Old Testament. 30 (1): 91–111. doi:10.1080/09018328.2016.1122292.
- Weksler-Bdolah, Shlomit (2019). Aelia Capitolina – Jerusalem in the Roman Period: In Light of Archaeological Research. BRILL. ISBN 9789004417076.
