= Daniel 7 =

Seventh chapter of the Book of Daniel

Daniel 7 (the seventh chapter of the Book of Daniel) tells of Daniel's vision of four world-kingdoms replaced by the kingdom of the saints or "holy ones" of the Most High, which will endure for ever. Four beasts come out of the sea, the Ancient of Days sits in judgment over them, and "one like a son of man" is given eternal kingship. An angelic guide interprets the beasts as kingdoms and kings, the last of whom will make war on the "holy ones" of God, but they will be destroyed and the "holy ones" will be given eternal dominion and power.

Although set during the reign or regency of King Belshazzar (who probably died in 539 BCE), the prophetic chapters of the Book of Daniel date to 167–164 BCE, with Daniel 7 dated somewhat earlier than the rest. It is an apocalypse, a literary genre in which a heavenly reality is revealed to a human recipient; it is also an eschatology, a divine revelation concerning the moment in which God will intervene in history to usher in the final kingdom. Its context is oppression of the Jews by the Seleucid ruler Antiochus IV Epiphanes, who outlawed Jewish customs and built an altar to Zeus in the Temple (the "abomination of desolation"), sparking a popular uprising which led to the retaking of Jerusalem and the Temple by Judas Maccabeus. Chapter 7 reintroduces the theme of the "four kingdoms" of chapter 2, which is that Israel would come under four successive world-empires, each worse than the last, until finally God would end oppression and introduce the eternal kingdom.

== Summary ==
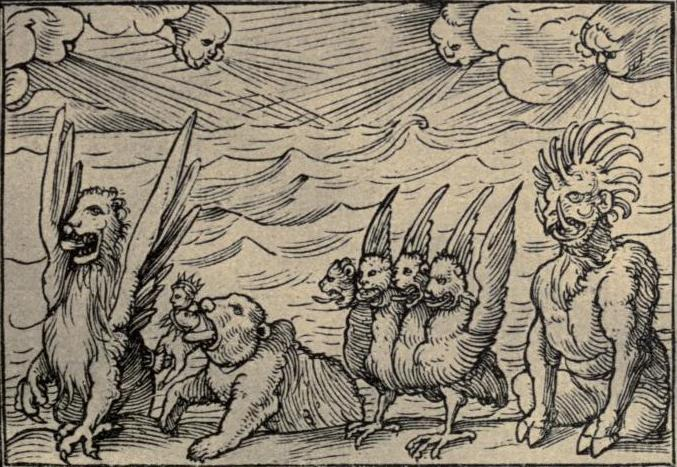
Daniel's vision of the four beasts – woodcut by Hans Holbein the Younger

In the first year of Belshazzar, king of Babylon (probably 553 BC), Daniel receives a vision from God. He sees the "great sea" stirred up by the "four winds of heaven," and from the waters emerge four beasts, the first a lion with the wings of an eagle, the second a bear, the third a winged leopard with four heads, and the fourth a beast with ten horns, and a further horn appeared which uprooted three of the ten. As Daniel watches, the Ancient of Days takes his seat on the throne of heaven and sits in judgment in the midst of the heavenly court, the fourth and worst beast is put to death, and a being like a human ("like a son of man") approaches the Ancient One in the clouds of heaven and is given everlasting kingship. A heavenly being explains the vision: the four beasts are four earthly kings (or kingdoms), "but the holy ones of the Most High shall receive and possess the kingdom forever." Regarding the fourth beast, the ten horns are ten kings of this last and greatest earthly kingdom; the eleventh horn (king) will overthrow three kings and make war on the "holy ones of God", and attempt to change the sacred seasons and the law he will have power "for a time, two times and a half", but when his allotted time is done he will be destroyed, and the holy ones will possess the eternal kingdom.

== Structure and composition ==
=== Book of Daniel ===
It is generally accepted that the Book of Daniel originated as a collection of folktales among the Jewish community in Babylon and Mesopotamia in the Persian and early Hellenistic periods (5th to 3rd centuries BC), expanded by the visions of chapters 7–12 in the Maccabean era (mid-2nd century BC). Modern scholarship agrees that Daniel is a legendary figure. It is possible that the name was chosen for the hero of the book because of his reputation as a wise seer in Hebrew tradition. The tales are in the voice of an anonymous narrator, except for chapter 4 which is in the form of a letter from king Nebuchadnezzar II. Chapters 2–7 are in Aramaic (after the first few lines of chapter 2 in Hebrew) and are in the form of a chiasmus, a poetic structure in which the main point or message of a passage is placed in the centre and framed by further repetitions on either side:

- A. (2:4b-49) – A dream of four kingdoms replaced by a fifth
  - B. (3:1–30) – Daniel's three friends in the fiery furnace
    - C. (4:1–37) – Daniel interprets a dream for Nebuchadnezzar
    - C'. (5:1–31) – Daniel interprets the handwriting on the wall for Belshazzar
  - B'. (6:1–28) – Daniel in the lions' den
- A'. (7:1–28) – A vision of four world kingdoms replaced by a fifth

=== Chapter 7 ===
Chapter 7 is pivotal to the larger structure of the entire book, acting as a bridge between the tales of chapters 1–6 and the visions of 7–12. The use of Aramaic and its place in the chiasm link it to the first half, while the use of Daniel as first-person narrator and its emphasis on visions link it to the second. There is also a temporal shift: the tales in chapters 1–6 have run from Nebuchadnezzar to Belshazzar to Darius, but in chapter 7 we move back to the first year of Belshazzar and the forward movement starts over again, to the third year of Belshazzar, the first year of Darius, and then the third year of Cyrus.

Most scholars accept that the chapter was written as a unity, possibly based on an early anti-Hellenistic document from around 300 BC; verse 9 is usually printed as poetry, and may be a fragment of an ancient psalm. The overall structure can be described as follows:

- Introduction (verses 1–2a)
- Vision report: vision of the four beasts; vision of the "little horn"; throne vision; vision of judgement; vision of a figure on the clouds (2b–14)
- Interpretation (15–18)
- Additional clarification of the vision (19–27)
- Conclusion (28)

== Genre and themes ==
=== Genre ===
The Book of Daniel is an apocalypse, a literary genre in which a heavenly reality is revealed to a human recipient. Apocalypses are characterized by visions, symbolism, an other-worldly mediator, an emphasis on cosmic events, angels and demons, and pseudonymity (false authorship). Apocalypses were common from 300 BC to AD 100, not only among Jews and Christians, but Greeks, Romans, Persians and Egyptians. Daniel, the book's hero, is a representative apocalyptic seer, the recipient of the divine revelation: has learned the wisdom of the Babylonian magicians and surpassed them, because his God is the true source of knowledge. Daniel is one of the maskilim, the wise, whose task is to teach righteousness. The book is also an eschatology, meaning a divine revelation concerning the end of the present age, a moment in which God will intervene in history to usher in the final kingdom.

=== Themes ===
The overall theme of the Book of Daniel is God's sovereignty over history. Written to encourage Jews undergoing persecution at the hands of Antiochus Epiphanes, the Seleucid king of Syria, the visions of chapters 7–12 predict the end of the earthly Seleucid kingdom, its replacement by the eternal kingdom of God, the resurrection of the dead, and the final judgement. Chapter 7 reintroduces the theme of the "four kingdoms", which is that Israel (or the world) would come under four successive world-empires, each worse than the last, until finally God and his hosts would end oppression and introduce the eternal kingdom.

== Historical background: from Babylon to the Greeks ==
In the late 7th and early 6th centuries BC the Neo-Babylonian empire dominated the Middle East. The Kingdom of Judah began the period as a Babylonian client state, but after a series of rebellions Babylon reduced it to the status of a province and carried off its élite (not all its population) into captivity. This "Babylonian exile" ended in 538 BC when Medes and Persians led by Cyrus the Great conquered Babylon and ushered in the Persian or Achaemenid empire (with the Achaemenids as the ruling dynasty). The Persian empire in turn succumbed to Alexander the Great in the second half of the 4th century, and following Alexander's death in 323 BC his generals divided his empire between themselves. The Roman Empire in turn eventually took control over those parts of the Middle East to the west of Mesopotamia. Judea fell first under the control of the Ptolemies of Egypt, but around 200 BC it passed to the Seleucids, then based in Syria. Both dynasties were Greek and both promoted Greek culture, usually peacefully, but the Seleucid ruler Antiochus IV, also called Antiochus Epiphanes (reigned 175-164 BC) proved an exception. Interpreting Jewish opposition as motivated by religion and culture, he outlawed Jewish customs such as circumcision, kosher dietary restrictions, Sabbath observance, and the Jewish scriptures (the Torah). In his most infamous act he built an altar to Zeus over the altar of burnt offerings in the Temple (the "abomination of desolation"), sparking in 167 BC a massive popular uprising against Hellenic Greek rule which led to the retaking of Jerusalem by Judas Maccabeus and the purification of the Temple in 164 BC.

== Imagery and symbolism ==
Many scholars have accepted the view that the imagery of Daniel 7 comes ultimately from the Canaanite myth of Baʿal's battle with Yamm (lit. "Sea"), symbolic of chaos. Although no exact prototype for the imagery exists, there are a number of parallels with the extant myth. The four beasts are chaos monsters which appeared as serpents in the Baʿal Cycle discovered in the ruins of Ugarit in the 1920s. In Daniel 7, composed sometime before Judas Maccabeus purified the temple in 164 BC, they symbolise Babylon, the Medes, Persia and Greece:

- The lion: Babylon. Its transformation into a man reverses Nebuchadnezzar's transformation into a beast in chapter 4, and the "human mind" may reflect his regaining sanity; the "plucked wings" reflect both loss of power and the transformation to a human state.
- The bear: the Medes – compare Jeremiah 51:11 on the Medes attacking Babylon.
- The leopard: Persia. The four heads may reflect the four Persian kings of Daniel 11:2–7.
- The fourth beast: The Greeks and particularly the Seleucids of Syria.

The "ten horns" that appear on the beast is a round number standing for the Seleucid kings between Seleucus I, the founder of the kingdom, and Antiochus Epiphanes , comparable to the feet of iron and clay in chapter 2 and the succession of kings described in chapter 11. The "little horn" is Antiochus himself. The "three horns" uprooted by the "little horn" reflect the fact that Antiochus was fourth in line to the throne, and became king after his brother and one of his brother's sons were murdered and the second son exiled to Rome. Antiochus was responsible only for the murder of one of his nephews, but the author of Daniel 7 holds him responsible for all. Anthiochus called himself Theos Epiphanes, "God Manifest", suiting the "arrogant" speech of the little horn.

The next scene is the divine court. Israelite monotheism should have only one throne as there is only one god, but here we see multiple thrones, suggesting the mythic background to the vision. The "Ancient of Days" echoes Canaanite El, but his wheeled throne suggests Ezekiel's mobile throne of God. He is surrounded by fire and an entourage of "ten thousand times ten thousand", an allusion to the heavenly hosts attending Yahweh, the God of Israel, as he rides to battle against his people's enemies. There is no battle, however; instead "the books" are opened and the fate of Israel's enemies is decided by God's sovereign judgement.

The identity of the "one like a son of man" who approaches God on his throne has been much discussed. The usual suggestion is that this figure represents the triumph of the Jewish people over their oppressor; the main alternative view is that he is the angelic leader of God's heavenly host, a connection made explicitly in chapters 10–12, where the reader is told that the conflict on Earth is mirrored by a war in heaven between Michael, the angelic champion of Israel, assisted by Gabriel, and the angelic "princes" of Greece and Persia; the idea that he is the messiah is sometimes advanced, but Daniel makes no clear reference to the messiah elsewhere.

The "holy ones" seems to refer to the persecuted Jews under Antiochus; the "sacred seasons and the law" are the Jewish religious customs disrupted by him; the "time, two times and a half" is approximately the time of the persecution, from 167 to 164 BC, as well as being half of seven, the "perfect number".

Kingship is taken from the four beasts, whose rule is "succeeded by the kingdom of the saints of the Most High, which will endure for ever". "Their kingly power is an everlasting power": the hasidim (the sect of "the pious ones") believed that the restoration of Jewish worship in the temple would usher in the final age.

== In popular culture ==
Popular Israeli musician Meir Ariel's song "Chayat HaBarzel" (The Iron Beast) links the fourth beast of Daniel 7 to modern industrial society.

== See also ==
- 1260-day prophecy
- 1 Maccabees
- 2 Maccabees
- Antinomianism

== Bibliography ==
- Aune, David E. (2010). "The World of Roman Hellenism". In Aune, David E. (ed.). The Blackwell Companion to The New Testament. John Wiley & Sons. ISBN 9781444318944.
- Bandstra, Barry L. (2008). Reading the Old Testament: An Introduction to the Hebrew Bible. Wadsworth Publishing Company. ISBN 978-0495391050.
- Boyer, Paul S. (1992). When Time Shall Be No More: Prophecy Belief in Modern American Culture. Harvard University Press. ISBN 0-674-95129-8.
- Brettler, Mark Zvi (2005). How To Read the Bible. Jewish Publication Society. ISBN 9780827610019.
- Carroll, John T. (2000). "Eschatology". In Freedman, David Noel; Myers, Allen C. (eds.). Eerdmans Dictionary of the Bible. Eerdmans. ISBN 9789053565032.
- Cohn, Shaye J.D. (2006). From the Maccabees to the Mishnah. Westminster John Knox Press. ISBN 9780664227432.
- Collins, John J. (1984). Daniel: With an Introduction to Apocalyptic Literature. Eerdmans. ISBN 9780802800206.
- Collins, John J. (1998). The Apocalyptic Imagination: An Introduction to Jewish Apocalyptic Literature. Eerdmans. p. 103. ISBN 9780802843715. "Son of Man: The interpretation and influence of Daniel 7."
- Collins, John J. (2002). "Current Issues in the Study of Daniel". In Collins, John J.; Flint, Peter W.; VanEpps, Cameron (eds.). The Book of Daniel: Composition and Reception. Vol. I. BRILL. ISBN 9004116753.
- Collins, John J. (2003). "From Prophecy to Apocalypticism: The Expectation of the End". In McGinn, Bernard; Collins, John J.; Stein, Stephen J. (eds.). The Continuum History of Apocalypticism. Continuum. ISBN 9780826415202.
- Coogan, Michael (2009). A Brief Introduction to the Old Testament. Oxford: Oxford University Press. p. 400.
- Crawford, Sidnie White (2000). "Apocalyptic". In Freedman, David Noel; Myers, Allen C. (eds.). Eerdmans Dictionary of the Bible. Eerdmans. ISBN 9789053565032.
- Davidson, Robert (1993). "Jeremiah, Book of". In Metzger, Bruce M.; Coogan, Michael D. (eds.). The Oxford Companion to the Bible. Oxford University Press. ISBN 9780199743919. "Jeremiah Book Of"
- Davies, Philip (2006). "Apocalyptic". In Rogerson, J. W.; Lieu, Judith M. (eds.). The Oxford Handbook of Biblical Studies. Oxford Handbooks Online. ISBN 9780199254255.
- DeChant, Dell (2009). "Apocalyptic Communities". In Neusner, Jacob (ed.). World Religions in America: An Introduction. Westminster John Knox Press. ISBN 9781611640472.
- Driver, S. R., ed. (1900). "Daniel 7". Cambridge Bible for Schools and Colleges – via Bible Hub.
- Dunn, James D.G. (2002). "The Danilic Son of Man in the New Testament". In Collins, John J.; Flint, Peter W.; VanEpps, Cameron (eds.). The Book of Daniel: Composition and Reception. BRILL. ISBN 0391041282.
- Gallagher, Eugene V. (2011). "Millennialism, Scripture, and Tradition". In Wessinger, Catherine (ed.). The Oxford Handbook of Millennialism. Oxford University Press. ISBN 9780195301052.
- Goldingay, John J. (2002). "Daniel in the Context of OT Theology". In Collins, John J.; Flint, Peter W.; VanEpps, Cameron (eds.). The Book of Daniel: Composition and Reception. Vol. II. BRILL. ISBN 0391041282.
- Grabbe, Lester L. (2010). An Introduction to Second Temple Judaism: History and Religion of the Jews in the Time of Nehemiah, the Maccabees, Hillel, and Jesus. Continuum. ISBN 9780567552488.
- Grabbe, Lester L. (2002). Judaic Religion in the Second Temple Period: Belief and Practice from the Exile to Yavneh. Routledge. ISBN 9780203461013.
- Grabbe, Lester L. (2002). "A Dan(iel) For All Seasons". In Collins, John J.; Flint, Peter W.; VanEpps, Cameron (eds.). The Book of Daniel: Composition and Reception. BRILL. ISBN 9004116753.
- Hammer, Raymond (1976). The Book of Daniel. Cambridge University Press. ISBN 9780521097659.
- Harrington, Daniel J. (1999). Invitation to the Apocrypha. Eerdmans. ISBN 9780802846334.
- Hebbard, Aaron B. (2009). Reading Daniel as a Text in Theological Hermeneutics. Wipf and Stock Publishers. ISBN 9781606089910.
- Hill, Andrew E. (2009). "Daniel-Malachi". In Longman, Tremper; Garland, David E. (eds.). The Expositor's Bible Commentary. Vol. 8. Zondervan. ISBN 9780310590545.
- Hill, Charles E. (2000). "Antichrist". In Freedman, David Noel; Myers, Allen C. (eds.). Eerdmans Dictionary of the Bible. Eerdmans. ISBN 9789053565032.
- Holbrook, Frank B. (1986). The Seventy Weeks, Leviticus, and the Nature of Prophecy (Volume 3 of Daniel and Revelation Committee Series ed.). Biblical Research Institute, General Conference of Seventh-day Adventists. ISBN 0925675024.
- Horsley, Richard A. (2007). Scribes, Visionaries, and the Politics of Second Temple Judea. Presbyterian Publishing Corp. ISBN 9780664229917.
- Knibb, Michael (2009). Essays on the Book of Enoch and Other Early Jewish Texts and Traditions. BRILL. ISBN 978-9004167254.
- Knibb, Michael (2002). "The Book of Daniel in its Context". In Collins, John J.; Flint, Peter W.; VanEpps, Cameron (eds.). The Book of Daniel: Composition and Reception. BRILL. ISBN 9004116753.
- Koch, Klaus (2002). "Stages in the Canonization of the Book of daniel". In Collins, John J.; Flint, Peter W.; VanEpps, Cameron (eds.). The Book of Daniel: Composition and Reception. BRILL. ISBN 0391041282.
- Kratz, Reinhard (2002). "The Visions of Daniel". In Collins, John J.; Flint, Peter W.; VanEpps, Cameron (eds.). The Book of Daniel: Composition and Reception. BRILL. ISBN 9004116753.
- Levine, Amy-Jill (2010). "Daniel". In Coogan, Michael D.; Brettler, Marc Z.; Newsom, Carol A. (eds.). The new Oxford annotated Bible with the Apocryphal/Deuterocanonical books : New Revised Standard Version. Oxford University Press. ISBN 9780199370504.
- Lucas, Ernest C. (2005). "Daniel, Book of". In Vanhoozer, Kevin J.; Bartholomew, Craig G.; Treier, Daniel J. (eds.). Dictionary for Theological Interpretation of the Bible. Baker Academic. ISBN 9780801026942.
- Mangano, Mark (2001). Esther & Daniel. College Press. ISBN 9780899008851.
- Matthews, Victor H.; Moyer, James C. (2012). The Old Testament: Text and Context. Baker Books. ISBN 9780801048357.
- Nelson, William B. (2000). "Daniel". In Freedman, David Noel; Myers, Allen C. (eds.). Eerdmans Dictionary of the Bible. Eerdmans. ISBN 9789053565032.
- Nelson, William B. (2013). Daniel. Baker Books. ISBN 9781441240064.
- Newsom, Carol A.; Breed, Brennan W. (2014). Daniel: A Commentary. Presbyterian Publishing Corp. ISBN 9780664220808.
- Nichol, F., ed. (1954). "chronology chart". SDA Bible Commentary. pp. 326–327.
- Niskanen, Paul (2004). The Human and the Divine in History: Herodotus and the Book of Daniel. Continuum. ISBN 9780567082138.
- Pasachoff, Naomi E.; Littman, Robert J. (2005). A Concise History of the Jewish People. Rowman & Littlefield. ISBN 9780742543669.
- Portier-Young, Anathea E. (2013). Apocalypse Against Empire: Theologies of Resistance in Early Judaism. Eerdmans. ISBN 9780802837110.
- Provan, Iain (2003). "Daniel". In Dunn, James D. G.; Rogerson, John William (eds.). Eerdmans Commentary on the Bible. Eerdmans. ISBN 9780802837110.
- Redditt, Paul L. (2008). Introduction to the Prophets. Eerdmans. ISBN 9780802828965.
- Reid, Stephen Breck (2000). "Daniel, Book of". In Freedman, David Noel; Myers, Allen C. (eds.). Eerdmans Dictionary of the Bible. Eerdmans. ISBN 9789053565032.
- Rowland, Christopher (2007). "Apocalyptic Literature". In Hass, Andrew; Jasper, David; Jay, Elisabeth (eds.). The Oxford Handbook of English Literature and Theology. Oxford University Press. ISBN 9780199271979.
- Ryken, Leland; Wilhoit, Jim; Longman, Tremper (1998). Dictionary of Biblical Imagery. InterVarsity Press. ISBN 9780830867332.
- Sacchi, Paolo (2004). The History of the Second Temple Period. Continuum. ISBN 9780567044501.
- Schwartz, Daniel R. (1992). Studies in the Jewish Background of Christianity. Mohr Siebeck. ISBN 9783161457982.
- Seow, C.L. (2003). Daniel. Westminster John Knox Press. ISBN 9780664256753.
- Schiffman, Lawrence H. (1991). From Text to Tradition: A History of Second Temple and Rabbinic Judaism. KTAV Publishing House. ISBN 9780881253726.
- Spencer, Richard A. (2002). "Additions to Daniel". In Mills, Watson E.; Wilson, Richard F. (eds.). The Deuterocanonicals/Apocrypha. Mercer University Press. ISBN 9780865545106.
- Towner, W. Sibley (1993). "Daniel". In Coogan, Michael D.; Metzger, Bruce M. (eds.). The Oxford Companion to the Bible. Oxford University Press. ISBN 9780199743919.
- Towner, W. Sibley (1984). Daniel. Westminster John Knox Press. ISBN 9780664237561.
- VanderKam, James C. (2010). The Dead Sea Scrolls Today. Eerdmans. ISBN 9780802864352.
- VanderKam, James C.; Flint, Peter (2013). The meaning of the Dead Sea scrolls: their significance for understanding the Bible, Judaism, Jesus, and Christianity. HarperCollins. ISBN 9780062243300.
- Weber, Timothy P. (2007). "Millennialism". In Walls, Jerry L. (ed.). The Oxford Handbook of Eschatology. Oxford University Press. ISBN 9780199742486.
- Wesselius, Jan-Wim (2002). "The Writing of Daniel". In Collins, John J.; Flint, Peter W.; VanEpps, Cameron (eds.). The Book of Daniel: Composition and Reception. BRILL. ISBN 0391041282.
- White, Ellen (2014). Yahweh's Council: Its Structure and Membership. Mohr Siebeck. ISBN 9783161532931.
