= Bible prophecy =

Bible prophecy or biblical prophecy comprises the passages of the Bible that are claimed to reflect communications from God to humans through prophets. Jews and Christians usually consider the biblical prophets to have received revelations from God.

Prophetic passages—inspirations, interpretations, admonitions or predictions—appear widely distributed throughout Biblical narratives. Some future-looking prophecies in the Bible are conditional, with the conditions either implicitly assumed or explicitly stated.

In general, believers in biblical prophecy engage in exegesis and hermeneutics of scriptures which they believe contain descriptions of global politics, natural disasters, the future of the nation of Israel, the coming of a Messiah and of a Messianic Kingdom—as well as the ultimate destiny of humankind.

== Overview ==
Prophets in the Bible often warn the Israelites to repent of their sins and idolatries, with the threat of punishment or reward. They attribute both blessings and catastrophes to God. According to believers in Bible prophecy, later biblical passages—especially those contained in the New Testament—contain accounts of the fulfillment of many of these prophecies.

Christianity has taken a number of biblical passages as prophecies or foreshadowings of a coming Messiah. Christians believe that Christ Jesus fulfills these messianic prophecies, while followers of Rabbinic Judaism still await the arrival of the Jewish Messiah and other signs of Jewish eschatology. Most Christians believe that the Second Coming of Christ will fulfill many messianic prophecies, though some Christians (Full Preterists) believe that all Messianic prophecies have already been fulfilled. Rabbinic Judaism does not separate the original coming of the Messiah and the advent of a Messianic Age. (For details of differences, see Christianity and Judaism.)

A much-discussed issue within Christianity concerns the "end times", or "last days", particularly as depicted in the Book of Revelation.

== Hebrew Bible ==
=== Genesis ===
Genesis 15:18 promises Abraham and his descendants the land of Canaan from the river of Egypt to the Euphrates, and Genesis 17:8 states:

And I will give to you, and to your offspring after you, the land where you are now an alien, all the land of Canaan, for a perpetual holding; and I will be their God.

F. F. Bruce argues that the fulfilment of this prophecy occurred during David's reign. He writes:

David's sphere of influence now extended from the Egyptian frontier on the Wadi el-Arish (the "brook of Egypt") to the Euphrates; and these limits remained the ideal boundaries of Israel's dominion long after David's empire had disappeared.

Christian apologists point to corporate personality here to connect Abraham with the Jewish nation. H. Wheeler Robinson writes:

Corporate personality is the important Semitic complex of thought in which there is a constant oscillation between the individual and the group—family, tribe, or nation—to which he belongs, so that the king or some other representative figure may be said to embody the group, or the group may be said to sum up the host of individuals.

=== Exodus, Deuteronomy, Joshua, and Judges ===
God is represented as guaranteeing that the Israelites would drive out the Amorites, Canaanites, Hittites, Perizzites, Hivites and Jebusites from their lands, so that the Israelites could appropriate them.(Exodus 34:10–11). The same applies to the Girgashites (Deuteronomy 7:1–2). In Exodus 34:10–27, this is referred to as a covenant, commandments being given. In Judges, the Israelites are described as disobeying the commandment to worship no other gods (Judges 3:6) and, as a result, not being able to drive out the Jebusites (Joshua 15:63). The Israelites did not drive all of the Canaanite tribes out in the lifetime of Joshua. The books of Joshua and Judges (Chapters 1) mention towns that could not be defeated. According to 2 Samuel, the Israelites occupied Canaan but the complete seizure took place only when David defeated the Jebusites in Jerusalem and made it the capital of the Kingdom of Israel. (2 Sam 5:6–7)

=== Davidic dynasty ===
Biblical scriptures say that God states that the house, throne and kingdom of David and his offspring (called "the one who will build a house for my Name" in the verse) will last forever (2 Samuel 7:12–16; 2 Chronicles 13:5; Psalm 89:20–37). 1 Kings 9:4–7 as well as 1 Chronicles 28:5 and 2 Chronicle 7:17 state that Solomon's establishment is conditional on Solomon obeying God's commandments.

According to bible stories Solomon built the temple in Jerusalem (2 Chronicles 2:1; 6:7–10) and did not obey God's commandments (1 Kings 11:1–14).

Biblical stories place the destruction of the 'Kingdom of Judah' by Nebuchadnezzar II in 586 BC and tell that this brought an end to the rule of the royal house of David.

Some scholars including Saul of Cyrene state that God has promised an eternal dynasty to David unconditionally (1 Kings 11:36; 15:4; 2 Kings 8:19). They feel the conditional promise of 1 Kings 9:4–7 seems to undercut this unconditional covenant. Most interpreters have taken the expression "throne of Israel" as a reference to the throne of the United Monarchy. They see this as a conditionalization of the unconditional dynastic promise to David's house expressed in 1 Kings 11:36, 15:4 and 2 Kings 8:19. They argue the presence of both unconditional and conditional promises to the house of David would create intense theological dissonance in the Book of Kings.

Christians believe that the promise is of surviving descendants that could fulfill the role of king rather than a permanent earthly kingship.

=== Kings ===
- According to the Book of Jeremiah, God told Zedekiah:

I am about to hand this city over to the king of Babylon, and he will burn it down. You will not escape from his grasp but will surely be captured and handed over to him. You will see the king of Babylon with your own eyes, and he will speak with you face to face. And you will go to Babylon... You will not die by the sword; you will die peacefully. (Jeremiah 34:2–5)

However, the Books of Kings and Jeremiah relate that when Zedekiah was captured, his sons were slaughtered before his eyes, his eyes were put out, he was chained in bronze, and taken to Babylon where he was imprisoned until death. (2 Kings 25:6–7 and Jeremiah 52:10–11) There is no other historical record of what happened with Zedekiah in Babylon.

- God is also represented as promising Josiah that because he humbled himself before God, he would be "buried in peace" and the book goes on to say he shall not see the disaster to come on Judah (2 Kings 22:19–20).

Josiah fought against the Egyptians although the pharaoh, Necho II, prophesied that God would destroy him if he did (2 Chronicles 35:21–22)—possibly Josiah was "opposing the faithful prophetic party". Josiah was killed in battle against the Egyptians (2 Kings 23:29–30). However, Judah was in a time of peace when Josiah died, thus fulfilling the prophecy.

=== Isaiah ===
- When the Jews heard that "Aram has allied itself with Ephraim" God is said to have told them:

It will not take place, it will not happen... Within sixty-five years Ephraim will be too shattered to be a people. (Isaiah 7:1–9)

According to 2 Chronicles 28:5–6 "God delivered the King of the Jews, Ahaz, into the hands of the King of Syria, who carried away a great multitude of them captives to Damascus. And he was also delivered into the hand of the King of Israel, who smote him with a great slaughter".

In Isaiah 7:9, the prophet says clearly that a prerequisite for the fulfillment of the prophecy is that Ahaz stands firm in his faith. This means that he should trust God and not seek military help in the Assyrians which Ahaz nevertheless did.

The Book of Isaiah also foretold;

- Babylon would be overthrown by the Medes (Isaiah 13:17–19) and its palaces taken over by wild animals. (Isaiah 13:21–22)

Christian apologists state that the prophecy in Isaiah chapters 13 and 21 could possibly have been directed originally against Assyria whose capital Nineveh was defeated in 612 BC by a combined onslaught of the Medes and Babylonians. According to this explanation the prophecy was later updated and referred to Babylon not recognizing the rising power of Persia. On the other hand, it can be mentioned that the Persian King Cyrus after overthrowing Media in 550 BC did not treat the Medes as a subject nation.

Instead of treating the Medes as a beaten foe and a subject nation, he had himself installed as king of Media and governed Media and Persia as a dual monarchy, each part of which enjoyed equal rights.

- Damascus will become a "heap of ruins. The cities of Aroer will be deserted and left to flocks". (Isaiah 17:1–2)

The prophecy may date from 735 BC when Damascus and Israel were allied against Judah. Tiglath-Pileser took Damascus in 732 BC, which some apologists point to as a fulfillment of this prophecy, but this campaign never reduced the city to rubble. The depiction of Damascus as a "heap of ruins" has been understood as figurative language to describe the despoiling of the city, the leading of its people as captives to Kir (an unidentified city), and the way that the city lost much of its wealth and political influence in the years following Tiglath-Pileser's attack. The prophecy is also believed by some to have a future fulfilment relating to end-time developments concerning Israel.

The passage is consistent with 2 Kings 16:9, which states that Assyria defeated the city and exiled the civilians to Kir.

- The river of Ancient Egypt (identified as the Nile in RSV) shall dry up. (Isaiah 19:5).
- "The land of Judah shall be a terror unto Egypt." (Isaiah 19:17)
- "There shall be five cities in Ancient Egypt that speak the Canaanite language." (Isaiah 19:18)
- "In that day there will be a highway from Egypt to Assyria. The Assyrians will go to Egypt and the Egyptians to Assyria. The Egyptians and Assyrians will worship together. 24 In that day Israel will be the third, along with Egypt and Assyria, a blessing on the earth. 25 The LORD Almighty will bless them, saying, 'Blessed be Egypt my people, Assyria my handiwork, and Israel my inheritance.'" (Isaiah 19:23–25)

Some theologians argue the statement that the "land of Judah" will terrify the Egyptians is not a reference to a large army from Judah attacking Egypt but a circumlocution for the place where God lives. They argue it is God and his plans that will cause Egypt to be terrified. They go on to argue the second "in that day" message from verse 18 announces the beginning of a deeper relationship between God and Egypt which leads to Egypt's conversion and worshiping God (verses 19–21). They say the last "in that day" prophecy (verses 23–25) speaks about Israel, Assyria and Egypt as God's special people, thus, describing eschatological events.

- The generals of Astyages, the last king of the Medes, mutinied at Pasargadae and the empire surrendered to the Persian Empire, which conquered Babylon in 539 BC under Cyrus the Great. The unknown second prophet (See Deutero-Isaiah) predicts the coming of Cyrus, (Isaiah 44:28, Isaiah 45:1) who will liberate the Jews from their Babylonian exile and bring them to the promised land. The second Isaiah, 40–55, comes from the late exilic period, about 540 BC. Some scholars believe the reference to Cyrus is a vaticinium ex eventu or "prophecy from the event".

There are many scholars, however, who point out that the prophet himself spoke of Cyrus arguing that Deutero-Isaiah interpreted Cyrus' victorious entry into Babylon in 539 BC as evidence of divine commission to benefit Israel. The main argument against the idols in these chapters is that they cannot declare the future, whereas God does tell future events like the Cyrus predictions.

=== Jeremiah ===
Jeremiah prophesied that;

- "...all nations will gather in Jerusalem to honour the name of the Lord." (3:17 (NIV))
- Hazor will be desolated. (49:33)
- The Babylonian captivity would end when the "70 years" ended. (Jeremiah 29:10)

It lasted 68 years (605 BC–537 BC) from the capture of the land of Israel by Babylon and the exile of a small number of hostages including Daniel, Hananiah, Azariah, and Mishael (Daniel 1:1–4). It lasted 60 years (597–537 BC) from the deportation of the 10,000 elite (2 Kings 24:14) including Jehoiachin and Ezekiel though there is a discrepancy with Jeremiah's numbers of exiles (Jeremiah 52:28–30). It lasted 49 years (586–537 BC) from the exile of the majority of Judah (2 Kings 25:11) including Jeremiah who was taken to Egypt and leaving behind a poor remnant (2 Kings 25:12).

However, some Christian scholars try to explain the figure in a different way stating that Jeremiah gave a round number.

- The "kings of the Medes" would "take vengeance" on Babylon. (Jeremiah 51:11)

Christian commentaries have considered the conquering Persian force an alliance between the Persians and the Medes. One suggests the use of the term "Medes" is due to earlier recognition among the Jews and because the generals of Cyrus were apparently Medes.

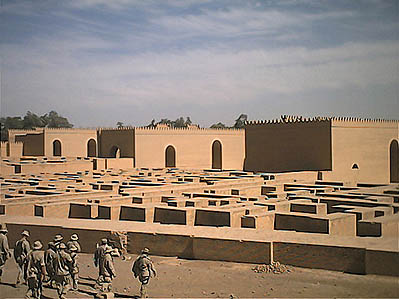
US Marines in front of Babylon as it stood in 2003

- Jeremiah prophesied that Babylon would be destroyed at the end of the seventy years. (25:12) (Babylon fell to the Persians under Cyrus in 539 BC (66, 58 or 47 years after the beginning of the Babylonian exile depending on how you count). According to Daniel 5:31, it was the currently unidentified "Darius the Mede" who captured Babylon.)
- Babylon would never again be inhabited.(50:39) (Saddam Hussein began to reconstruct it in 1985, but was abruptly halted by the invasion of Iraq. Iraqi leaders and UN officials now plan to restore Babylon.)
- "The Levitical priests shall never lack a man in my presence to offer burnt offerings, to burn cereal offerings, and to make sacrifices for ever".

The destruction of temple by the Romans in 70 brought an end to the Jewish sacrificial system.(33:18) (See Korban) Christians have stated this refers to the millennium in which Christ reigns for a thousand years, since Jeremiah 33:18 goes along with the eternal reign of the line of David in verses 21–22.

- God will make Jerusalem a heap of ruins, a haunt of jackals; and will lay waste the towns of Judah so no one can live there.(9:11)
- God will have compassion on Israel and cause them to return to the land after scattering them among the nations (12:14, 15; 31:8–10; 33:7).

=== Ezekiel ===
- Ezekiel prophesied the permanent destruction of Tyre. (Ezekiel 26:3–14)

Tyre was an island fortress-city with mainland villages along the shore. These mainland settlements were destroyed by Nebuchadnezzar II, but after a 13-year siege from 586 to 573 BC, the King of Tyre made peace with Nebuchadnezzar, going into exile and leaving the island city itself intact. Alexander the Great used debris from the mainland to build a causeway to the island, entered the city, and plundered the city, sacking it without mercy. Most of the residents were either killed in the battle or sold into slavery. It was quickly repopulated by colonists and escaped citizens, and later regained its independence. Tyre did eventually enter a period of decline, being reduced to a small remnant. Echoing Ezekiel's words, historian Philip Myers writes in 1889:

The city never recovered from this blow. The site of the once brilliant maritime capital is now "bare as the top of a rock," a place where the few fishermen that still frequent the spot spread their nets to dry.

Older sources often refer to the locations as a "fishing village". However, the nearby area grew rapidly in the 20th century. The ruins of a part of ancient Tyre (a protected site) can still be seen on the southern half of the island whereas modern Tyre occupies the northern half and also sprawls across Alexander's causeway and onto the mainland. It is now the fourth largest city in Lebanon with a population of approximately 200,000 inhabitants in the urban area in 2016.

- Ezekiel then prophesies the conquest of Egypt, the scattering of its entire population (it was to be uninhabited for 40 years), and Nebuchadnezzar plundering Egypt (Ezekiel 29:3 – Ezekiel 30:26).

This includes the claim that God will make Egypt so weak that it will never again rule over other nations. Pharaoh Amasis II (who drove off Nebuchadnezzar) also conquered Cyprus, ruling it until 545 BC. Despite being a powerful nation in ancient times, Egypt has since been ruled by the Persians, Greeks, Romans, Byzantine Empire, Ottomans, British and the French, and has also enjoyed periods of independence from external rule. During the Hellenistic period, the break-up of the empire of Alexander the Great left the Ptolemaic Dynasty (of Macedonian/Greek origin) as rulers of Egypt: the Ptolemies then conquered and ruled Cyrenaica (now northeastern Libya), Palestine, and Cyprus at various times. (see also History of Ptolemaic Egypt and Ptolemaic kingdom).

There is some uncertainty among modern scholars regarding when (and by whom) various portions of the Book of Ezekiel were written, making the timing of prophecies difficult to unravel (see Book of Ezekiel).

Nebuchadnezzar invaded Egypt around 568 BC. However, the armies of Pharaoh Amasis II defeated the Babylonians (though the author did not elaborate and there are no known detailed accounts of this invasion). Herodotus reports that this Pharaoh had a long and prosperous reign. The Egyptians were conquered by the Persians in 525 BC.

=== Minor prophets ===
- Amos prophesied that when Israel is restored they will possess the remnant of Edom. (Amos 9:12)
- Obadiah prophesied that Israel will destroy the house of Esau in the day of the Lord. (Obadiah18)
- Zechariah prophesied; "Never again will an oppressor overrun my people, for now I am keeping watch." (Zechariah 9:8)
- The river of Ancient Egypt (identified as the Nile in NIV, NASB, and RSV) shall dry up. (Zechariah 10:11)
- Haggai prophesied; "In a little while God will shake the heavens, and the earth, and the sea, and the dry land." (Haggai 2:6)
- Malachi prophesied that God would send Elijah before "the great and dreadful day of the LORD" in which the world will be consumed by fire. (Malachi 3:1, 4:1, 5) (In Mark 9:13 and Matthew 17:11–13, Jesus states that John the Baptist fulfilled the prophecy as the spiritual successor to Elijah.)

== Greek New Testament ==
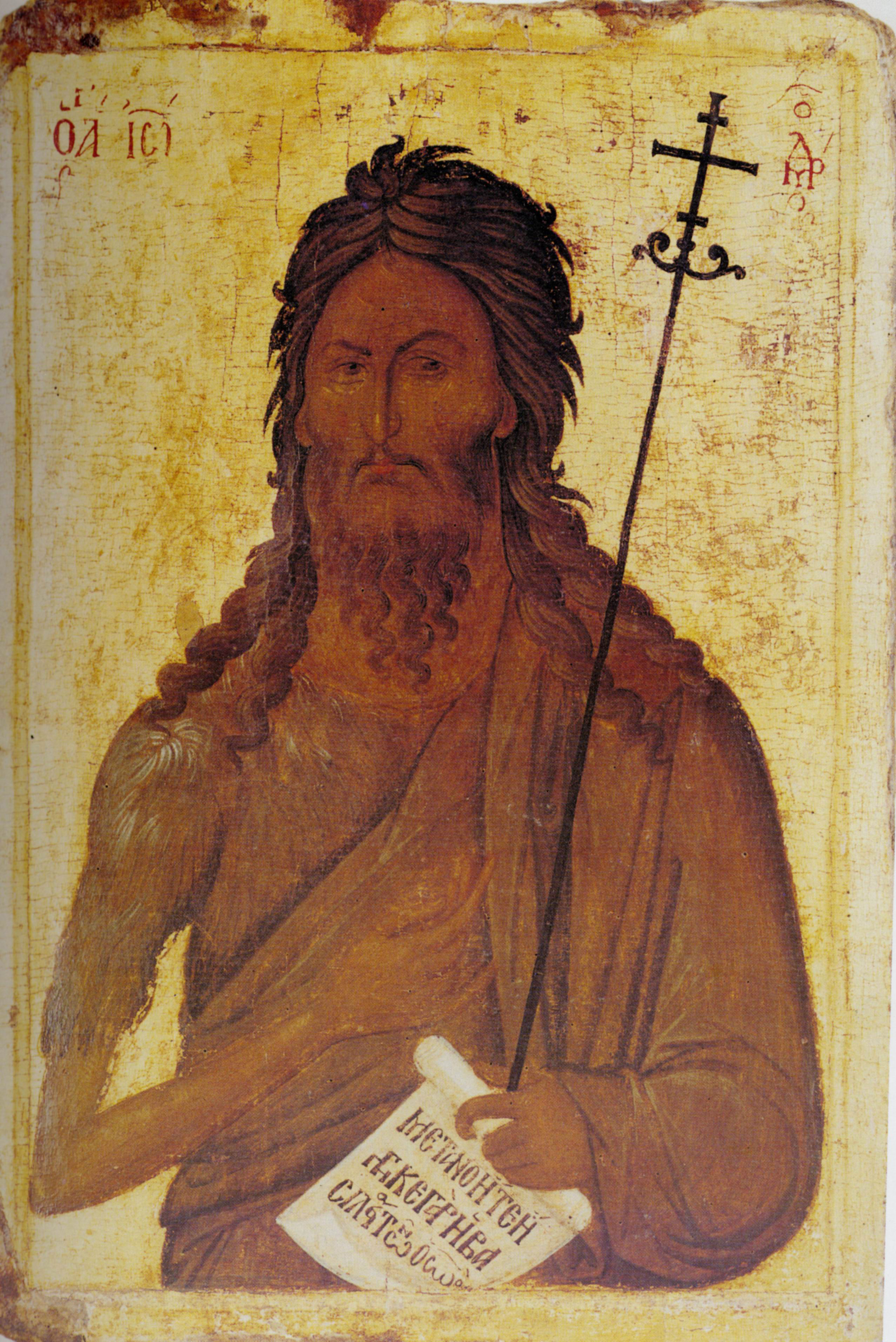
Eastern Orthodox icon of St. John the Baptist, 14th century, North Macedonia

=== Gospels ===
- In Matthew 10, when Jesus sent forth the twelve disciples, he told them:

"When you are persecuted in one place, flee to another. I tell you the truth, you will not finish going through the cities of Israel before the Son of Man comes." (Matthew 10:23)

The Christian response is varied:

Moffatt puts it "before the Son of man arrives" as if Jesus referred to this special tour of Galilee. Jesus could overtake them. Possibly so, but it is by no means clear. Some refer it to the Transfiguration, others to the coming of the Holy Spirit at Pentecost, others to the Second Coming. Some hold that Matthew has put the saying in the wrong context. Others bluntly say that Jesus was mistaken, a very serious charge to make in his instructions to these preachers. The use of ἑως [heōs] with aorist subjunctive for a future event is a good Greek idiom.

Preterist scholars explain this verse as referring to the destruction of the Jerusalem temple in 70 AD with the phrase "before the Son of Man comes" meaning before judgment comes upon the nation of Israel and the city of Jerusalem for rejecting Jesus Christ as The Messiah. They reject to refer Matthew 10:23 to the second coming of Jesus because Jesus speaks to his disciples about the towns of Israel:

Such a view completely divorces the passage from its immediate and localized context, such as the fact that this was an admonition to the apostles – and not directed to a generation several millennia removed from the first century.

The Wycliffe Bible Commentary disagrees with this view:

In the similar context of Mt 24:8–31 the great tribulation and the second advent are in view. Hence, the "coming of the Son of man" is probably eschatological here also. This would have been more readily understood by the disciples, who would hardly have thought to equate this "coming" with the destruction of Jerusalem in A.D. 70.

- In Matthew 12:40 Jesus says:

"as Jonas was three days and three nights in the whale's belly; so shall the Son of man be three days and three nights in the heart of the earth." (See also Matthew 16:21, 20:19, Mark 8:31, 9:31, 10:34, Luke 11:29–30 and John 2:19) According to Mark 15:42–46, Jesus was buried in Friday night and according to Matthew 28:1–6 and John 20:1, Jesus' tomb was found empty on Sunday dawn.

It is customary for eastern nations to count part of a day as a whole 24-hour day.

- Jesus prophesies in Matthew 16:27–28:

For the Son of Man is going to come in his Father's glory with his angels, and then he will reward each person according to what he has done. I tell you the truth, some who are standing here will not taste death before they see the Son of Man coming in his kingdom.

Christian responses have been varied:

Some of them that stand here (τινες των ὁδε ἑστωτων [tines tōn hode hestōtōn]). A crux interpretum in reality. Does Jesus refer to the transfiguration, the resurrection of Jesus, the great day of Pentecost, the destruction of Jerusalem, the second coming and judgment? We do not know, only that Jesus was certain of his final victory which would be typified and symbolized in various ways.

Preterists respond that Jesus did not mean His second coming but a demonstration of His might when He says "coming in his kingdom". In this view, this was accomplished by the destruction of the Jerusalem temple in 70 AD when some of the Apostles were still living and thus fulfilling the word of Jesus that only some will not have died. Others argue it refers to the Transfiguration. The Wycliffe Bible Commentary states:

This coming of the Son of Man in his kingdom is explained by some as the destruction of Jerusalem and by others as the beginning of the Church. But referring it to the Transfiguration meets the requirements of the context (all Synoptists follow this statement with the Transfiguration, Mk 9:1; Lk 9:27). Furthermore, Peter, who was one of those standing here, referred to the Transfiguration in the same words (II Pet 1:16–18). Chafer calls the Transfiguration a "preview of the coming kingdom on earth" (L. S. Chafer, Systematic Theology, V, 85).

- He also prophesies to Caiaphas (Matthew 26:64, KJV):

Hereafter you will see the Son of Man sitting at the right hand of the Power, and coming on the clouds of heaven.

The word "you will see" is in Greek "ὄψεσθε" [opheste, from the infinitive optomai] which is plural.

- Jesus declared in Gospel accounts of Matthew, Luke and John that Peter would deny him three times before cock-crow. Mark states that the cock crowed after the first denial as well as after the third denial. (First crow is not found in the NIV version)

Christians argue that the first cock-crow is simply missing from Matthew, Luke, and John. In Matthew (Matthew 26:34), Luke (Luke 22:34), and John (John 13:38), Jesus foretells three denials of Peter before cock-crow. Matthew 26:69–75, Luke 22:54–62, John 18:15–27 report the fulfillment of this prophecy. In Mark 14:30, Jesus speaks of two cock-crows, which is mentioned in Mark 14:66–72 as having taken place. Christians argue that Matthew, Luke, and John removed the first cock-crow and diminished (Luke even eliminated) the partial exit by Peter after the first denial (which Mark reports). If Mark was the "interpreter of Peter", he would have gotten his information directly and thus would be considered the more reliable source.

- Matthew 24:1,2 states (cf Luke 21:6):

Jesus left the temple and was walking away when his disciples came up to him to call his attention to its buildings. "Do you see all these things?" he asked. "I tell you the truth, not one stone here will be left on another; every one will be thrown down."

Preterists claim these verses are metaphorical. Others claim that the destruction of the temple in A.D. 70 fulfilled this despite the existence of the Wailing Wall. The IVP Bible Background Commentary states:

Some stones were left on others (e.g., part of one wall still stands), but this fact does not weaken the force of the hyperbole: the temple was almost entirely demolished in A.D. 70.

The parts of the wall Jesus refers to in the verse may not have included the wailing wall. Recent archaeological evidence suggest that the wailing wall part of the temple complex was not completed until an uncertain date in or after 16 A.D.

- Matthew 24:7–8 is part of Jesus response to the disciples in verse 5 asking, "when will this happen, and what will be the sign of your coming and of the end of the age?" It states:

Nation will rise against nation, and kingdom against kingdom. There will be famines and earthquakes in various places. All these are the beginning of birth pains.

The famines part of this verse has often been associated with the third seal of Revelation (Rev. 6:5–6), and the pestilences and earthquakes aspect has often been associated with the fourth seal of Revelation (Rev. 6:7–8). The presence of the term birthpains could be representative of better times ahead. Scholars point out that these events have always been on earth, so the verse must refer to a significant increase in the intensity of them.

There are also instances of erroneous, or untraceable, quotations from the prophets cited by the early Christians:

- Matthew 27:9 paraphrases Zechariah 11:12 and 13 in relation to buying a field for 30 pieces of silver, but attributes it as a saying of Jeremiah. Jeremiah is described as buying a field (Jeremiah 32:6–9) but for seventeen shekels of silver rather than 30.

Christian writers have given several responses. First is that the use of Jeremiah is meant to refer to all the books of prophecy. Second is that although Jeremiah said this, any record has not survived. Third is this was the result of a scribal error because of the single letter difference in the abridged versions of the names.

- Matthew 2:23 refers to a prophecy being fulfilled by Jesus living in Nazareth which is not found in the Old Testament.

Christians have given several responses. First is that this prophecy has not survived to the present day. Second is the Greek word nazaret does not mean Nazarene but is related to the Hebrew word netzer which can be translated as 'branch'. Third is that the verse is not a prophetic saying but simply reflects an Old Testament requirement for the Messiah to be held in contempt, (Psalm 22:6–8; 69:9–11, 19–21; Isaiah 53:2–4, 7–9) which they argue Nazarenes were (John 1:46; John 7:52).

- Mark 1:2–3 quotes from both Malachi 3:1 and Isaiah 40:3 but attributes to Isaiah only.

Some scholars respond that this is because the Malachi reference was just an introduction, which made it significantly less important than Isaiah 40:3, leading to the whole being attributed to the prophet Isaiah. Other reasons given are Isaiah's authority was considered higher than Malachi and the Isaiah text was better known.

=== Letters of Paul ===
- Paul the apostle prophesied about the Second Coming:

...we tell you that we who are still alive, who are left till the coming of the Lord, will certainly not precede those who have fallen asleep. For the Lord himself will come down from heaven, with a loud command, with the voice of the archangel and with the trumpet call of God, and the dead in Christ will rise first. After that, we who are still alive and are left will be caught up together with them in the clouds to meet the Lord in the air. And so we will be with the Lord forever. (1 Thessalonians 4:15–17)

Christians argue that Paul speaks about his own presence at the last day only hypothetically. They point out Paul later states the Day of the Lord comes like a thief (1 Thessalonians 5:1–2) which is a word Jesus uses himself (Matthew 24:43–44) expressing the impossibility of predicting His second coming (Matthew 24:36).

- Paul prophesied in 1 Thessalonians 5:2–11: "For you know very well that the day of the Lord will come like a thief in the night. While people are saying, Peace and safety, destruction will come on them suddenly, as labor pains on a pregnant woman, and they will not escape."
- In 2 Thessalonians 2:3–4, Paul prophesied that the Man of sin would sit in the temple of God declaring himself as God. The Temple in Jerusalem was destroyed in 70 CE.

There are different attempts to explain the term "to take his seat in the temple of God". Some understand it as a divine attribute which the man of lawlessness arrogates to himself and hence no conclusion can be drawn for time and place. Many in the early Church, such as Irenaeus, Hippolytus of Rome, Origen and Cyril of Jerusalem, believed a literal Temple would be rebuilt by the Antichrist before the Lord's Second Coming whereas Jerome and John Chrysostom referred the Temple to the Church. Also some today's scholars refer the phrase "God's temple" to the Church pointing out that Paul used this term five other times outside 2 Thessalonians and does not refer it to a literal temple.

- 1 Timothy 4:1–3 says "in the latter times some shall depart from the faith, giving heed to seducing spirits, and doctrines of devils; Speaking lies in hypocrisy; having their conscience seared with a hot iron; Forbidding to marry, and commanding to abstain from meats, which God hath created to be received with thanksgiving of them which believe and know the truth".

The Church Fathers such as John Chrysostom who lived at the time of Gnostics, the Marcionites, the Encratites, the Manicheans—who rejected Christian marriage and the eating of meat because they believed that all flesh was from an evil principle—asserted this text referred to such sects and that they were therefore "in the latter times". The Protestant theologian John Gill believed that this refers to the Canon Law of the Catholic Church, particularly priestly celibacy and Lent as promulgated by the medieval church. (see Great Apostasy)

- Paul wrote in Romans 13:11,12: "...our salvation is nearer now than when we first believed. The night is nearly over; the day is almost here."

Some Christian scholars believe the verses 11–14 refer to the era of salvation beginning with Christ's resurrection and its coming fulfillment on the last day. Thus, they think that the claim Paul makes here about salvation is a claim every Christian and not only Paul in his time can affirm. Some see this verse as indicating that there are no prophesied or salvation events before the Lord comes. Those holding the belief that Paul has a longer time span in view point to its context after Romans 11, which describes the repentance of all of Israel in future. They also point to Paul's plan to visit Rome and more western places in Romans 15 as indicating that he did not believe Christ's return would be soon enough to simply wait for it.

=== Other New Testament books ===
- The Epistle of Jude quotes a prophecy from the pseudepigraphical Book of Enoch. (Jude 14–15) Christians have argued that a canonical book quoting from a noncanonical source does not elevate the source to the same level; doing so simply addresses a point made by the other author. They point out the Old Testament quotes books never used in the canon, such as Joshua 10:13 and 2 Samuel 1:18 quoting from the Book of Jashar, and in the New Testament, Paul quotes pagan writers Aratus (Acts 17:28), Menander (1 Corinthians 15:33), and Epimenides (Titus 1:12). It is also suggested that the author of Jude might have been aware that the text of 1 Enoch 1:9 which he was quoting is in fact a form of midrash of Deuteronomy 33:2, so the prophecy is originally that of Moses, not "Enoch the Seventh from Adam" (itself a section heading from 1En.60:8)

=== Revelation ===
- In this first-century text, Jesus is spoken of as telling the Seven churches of Asia Minor (Revelation 1:3, Revelation 1:7) that he will come "soon". (Revelation 22:7, Revelation 22:10) (see also Seven seals, Four Horsemen of the Apocalypse, two witnesses, Woman of the Apocalypse, The Beast, Whore of Babylon, Millennialism)

The word "soon" (other translations use "shortly" or "quickly") does not have to be understood in the sense of close future. The Norwegian scholar Thorleif Boman explained that the Israelites, unlike Europeans or people in the West, did not understand time as something measurable or calculable according to Hebrew thinking but as something qualitative:

We have examined the ideas underlying the expression of calculable time and more than once have found that the Israelites understood time as something qualitative, because for them time is determined by its content.

...the Semitic concept of time is closely coincident with that of its content without which time would be quite impossible. The quantity of duration completely recedes behind the characteristic feature that enters with time or advances in it. Johannes Pedersen comes to the same conclusion when he distinguishes sharply between the Semitic understanding of time and ours. According to him, time is for us an abstraction since we distinguish time from the events that occur in time. The ancient Semites did not do this; for them time is determined by its content.

== Messianic prophecies in Judaism ==
In Judaism, the Messiah (משיח) (actual transliteration: "anointed") is defined as a human being (in no way correlated with divinity or being a deity), who must meet specified criteria, and bring about certain changes to the world, before they can be acknowledged as such. The following are requirements in Judaism concerning a coming Messiah. Some Christians maintain that some of these prophecies are associated with a putative "second coming", while Judaism states there is no concept of a second coming, given there was no first since Jesus is not Messiah.

1. He must be Jewish. (Deuteronomy 17:15, Numbers 24:17)

2. He must be a member of the tribe of Judah (Genesis 49:10) and a direct male descendent of both King David (I Chronicles 17:11, Psalm 89:29–38, Jeremiah 33:17, II Samuel 7:12–16) and King Solomon. (I Chronicles 22:10, II Chronicles 7:18)

3. He must gather the Jewish people from exile and return them to Israel. (Isaiah 27:12–13, Isaiah 11:12)

4. He must rebuild the Jewish Temple in Jerusalem. (Micah 4:1)

5. He must bring world peace. (Isaiah 2:4, Isaiah 11:6, Micah 4:3)

6. He must influence the entire world to acknowledge and serve one God. (Isaiah 11:9, Isaiah 40:5, Zephaniah 3:9)

All of these criteria for the Messiah are stated in the book of Ezekiel, Chapter 37:24–28:

"And My servant David will be a king over them, and they will

all have one shepherd, and they will walk in My ordinances, and keep My statutes, and observe them, and they shall live on the land that I gave to Jacob My servant...and I will make a

covenant of peace with them; it will be an everlasting covenant and I will set my sanctuary in their midst forever and My dwelling place shall be with them, and I will be their G-d and they will be My people. And the nations will know that I am the Lord who sanctifies Israel, when My sanctuary is in their midst forever."(Ezekiel, Chapter 37:24–28)

According to interpreters, If an individual fails to fulfill even one of these conditions, he cannot be the Messiah.

=== Arguments against Jesus as Jewish Messiah ===
While Christian biblical scholars have cited the following as prophecies referencing the life, status, and legacy of Jesus, Jewish scholars maintain that these passages are not messianic prophecies and are based on mistranslations/misunderstanding of the Hebrew texts.

- Deuteronomy 18:18
- Isaiah 7:14 – Matthew 1:22,23 states "The virgin will be with child and will give birth to a son, and they will call him Immanuel" – which means, "God with us". However the Jewish translation of that passage reads "Behold, the young woman is with child and will bear a son and she will call his name Immanuel." Isaiah chapter 7 speaks of a prophecy made to the Jewish King Ahaz to allay his fears of two invading kings (those of Damascus and of Samaria) who were preparing to invade Jerusalem, about 600 years before Jesus' birth. Isaiah 7:16: "For before the boy will know enough to refuse evil and choose good, the land whose two kings you dread will be forsaken."
- Isaiah 9:1, 2 – In Isaiah, the passage describes how Assyrian invaders are increasingly aggressive as they progress toward the sea, while Matthew 4:13–15 has re-interpreted the description as a prophecy stating that Jesus would progress (without any hint of becoming more aggressive) toward Galilee. While Matthew uses the Septuagint rendering of Isaiah, in the Masoretic Text it refers to the region of the gentiles rather than Galilee of the nations.
- Daniel 9:24–27 – King James Version puts a definite article before "Messiah the Prince". (Daniel 9:25) The original Hebrew text does not read "the Messiah the Prince", but, having no article, it is to be rendered "a mashiach, a prince". The word mashiach ["anointed one", "messiah"] is nowhere used in the Jewish Scriptures as a proper name, but as a title of authority of a king or a high priest. Therefore, a correct rendering of the original Hebrew should be: "an anointed one, a prince."
- Hosea 11:1 – Matthew 2:14 states, "So he got up, took the child and his mother during the night and left for Egypt, where he stayed until the death of Herod. And so was fulfilled what the Lord had said through the prophet: 'Out of Egypt I called my son.'" However, that passage reads, "When Israel was a child, I loved him, and out of Egypt I called my son."
- Psalm 22:16 – The NIV renders this verse as "they have pierced my hands and my feet", based on the Septuagint. However, there is some controversy over this translation, since the Hebrew Masoretic Text reads כארי ידי ורגלי ("like a lion my hands and my feet").
- Psalm 16:10
- Psalm 69:21
- Psalm 110:1 – Matthew 22:44 states "The Lord said to my Lord: Sit at my right hand until I put your enemies under your feet." Although Hebrew has no capital letters, the Hebrew translation of that passage reads "The Lord said to my lord" indicating that it is not speaking of God.
- Micah 5:2 – Matthew 2:6 quotes this prophecy as fulfillment of the prophecy: "But you, Bethlehem, in the land of Judah, are by no means least among the rulers of Judah; for out of you will come a ruler who will be the shepherd of my people Israel." The verse in the Old Testament reads "But you, Bethlehem Ephrathah, though you are small among the clans of Judah, out of you will come for me one who will be ruler over Israel, whose origins are from of old, from ancient times." It describes the clan of Bethlehem, who was the son of Caleb's second wife, Ephrathah. (1 Chr. 2:18, 2:50–52, 4:4)
- Zechariah 9:9 – The Gospel of Matthew describes Jesus' triumphant entry on Palm Sunday as a fulfillment of this verse in Zechariah. Matthew describes the prophecy in terms of a colt and a separate donkey, whereas the original only mentions the colt. Matthew 21:1–5 reads:
  Saying unto them, Go into the village over against you, and straightway ye shall find an ass tied, and a colt with her: loose them, and bring them unto me. All this was done, that it might be fulfilled which was spoken by the prophet, saying, Tell ye the daughter of Sion, Behold, thy King cometh unto thee, meek, and sitting upon an ass, and a colt the foal of an ass
  . The Hebrew translation of the prophecy reads:
  Rejoice greatly, O Daughter of Zion!/Shout, Daughter of Jerusalem/See, your king comes to you/righteous and having salvation/gentle and riding on a donkey/on a colt, the foal of a donkey.

The gospels of Mark, Luke, and John state Jesus sent his disciples after only one animal. (Mark 11:1–7, Luke 19:30–35, John 12: 14, 15) Critics claim this is a contradiction with some mocking the idea of Jesus riding two animals at the same time. A response claims that the text allows for Jesus to have ridden on a colt that was accompanied by a donkey, perhaps its mother.

- Matthew 2:17,18 gives the killing of innocents by Herod as the fulfillment of a prophecy in Jeremiah 31:15–23: "A voice is heard in Ramah, weeping and great mourning, Rachel weeping for her children and refusing to be comforted because they are no more. (The phrase "because her children are no more" refers to the captivity of Rachel's children. The subsequent verses describe their return to Israel.)

== Rashi ==
Rashi, a 10th-century French rabbi, gave the following commentaries regarding Bible prophecies:

- Genesis 15:18 " To your seed I have given The word of the Holy One, blessed be He, is like an accomplished fact."
- Genesis 17:8 " for an everlasting possession And there I will be to you for a God (Gen. Rabbah 46:9), but if one dwells outside the Holy Land, it is as though he has no God (Keth. 110b)."
- Exodus 34:11 " the Amorites... Six nations are [enumerated] here [not the proverbial seven], because the Girgashites [i.e., the seventh nation] got up and emigrated because of them [the Israelites]. -[from Lev. Rabbah 17:6, Yerushalmi Shevi ith 6:1.]"
- Deuteronomy 7:1 " He will cast away Heb. וְנָשַׁל. This is an expression meaning casting away, and causing to fly. Similarly is (Deut. 19:5),"and the iron [axe blade] will cause to fly [from the tree]."
- Joshua 15:63 " the children of Judah could not drive them out We learned in Sifrei : Rabbi Joshua the son of Korha says: They really could, but they were not permitted, because of the oath which Abraham had sworn to Abimelech. Now these Jebusites were not of the Jebusite nation, but the Tower of David which was in Jerusalem, was called Jebus, and the inhabitants of that section were of the Philistines. And when the children of Judah conquered Jerusalem, they did not drive out the inhabitants of that section."
- Judges 1:19 " but they could not drive out Targum Jonathan paraphrases: But after they had sinned, they were unable to drive out the inhabitants of the plain."
- Judges 1:21 " the Jebusites that inhabited Jerusalem There was a section in Jerusalem called Jebuse, which was populated by the descendants of Abimelech who were not driven out because of the oath [which Abraham had sworn], until the coming of David. This was because his grandson was still alive and Abraham had sworn [Gen. 21:23] to him, his son, and grandson."
- 2 Samuel 5:6 " to the Jebusites Mezudath Zion is called Jebus. Now they (the inhabitants of the area) were of the seed of Abimelech, and they were in possession of two statues, one blind and the other lame, symbolizing Isaac (who was blind in his latter years. See Gen. 22:1) and Jacob (who turned lame as a result of his bout with the angel. See Gen. 32:26), and in their mouths was the oath that Abraham had sworn to Abimelech (Gen. 22:23). For this reason they (the Israelites who had conquered the land) did not drive them out, for when they took Jerusalem they failed to take the stronghold, as it is stated: "And the Jebusites, the inhabitants of Jerusalem, the people of Judah were unable, etc." (Josh. 15:63) – it was learned: R. Joshua b. Levi said: They were indeed able but were not permitted."
- 2 Chronicles 13:5 " a covenant of salt with endurance and permanence."
- 2 Chronicles 35:22 " and he did not hearken to the words of Neco from the mouth of God who said to him from the mouth of God, for so said Isaiah, (19:2): 'And I will stir up Egyptians against Egyptians.' This is what the Kallir composed: 'He withheld his troops from marching to Aram Naharaim, in order that no single sword should pass through Ephraim; and he did not hearken to the prophet to turn back, for it was decreed that Egyptian be set against Egyptian.'"
- 1 Kings 9:7 " and this house which I have made sacrosanct for My Name There is a condition between Me and You, "If you heed not..." What is stated there? "I shall make desolate your sanctuaries" (Lev. 26:31)."
- 1 Kings 11:36 " a kingdom Heb. ניר, a kingdom. ניר is an expression of a yoke."
- Daniel 2:38–45 " You are the head of gold You are the golden head of the image that you saw, for your kingdom is strong, and now it is in existence and is very prominent. And after you will arise another kingdom lower than you And after you, after the reign of your son, Belshazzar, will arise a kingdom that will take the ruling power from your seed, lower and humbler than your kingdom. lower Aram. אֶרַע, lower, as silver is lower and humbler than gold, and you saw that the breast, which is after the head, was of silver; so will the kingdom of Media and Persia, which will follow the kingdom of Babylon, be humbler than the kingdom of Nebuchadnezzar. it will crumble and shatter It will crumble and shatter all the nations. it will be a divided kingdom It will be a divided kingdom; two kings will rise from it at once, strong and weak, as explained below (verse 42): "part of the kingdom will be strong." that they will mingle with the seed of men They will intermarry with the other nations but they will not be at peace and truly cleave to them wholeheartedly, and their laws will differ from the laws of the other nations. And in the days of these kings in the days of these kings, when the kingdom of Rome is still in existence. the God of heaven will set up a kingdom The kingdom of the Holy One, blessed be He, which will never be destroyed, is the kingdom of the Messiah.
- Daniel 7:4–8 " The first one was like a lion, and it had the wings of an eagle It was like a lion, and it had the wings of an eagle; that is the kingdom of Babylon, which was ruling at that time, and so did Jeremiah see it (4:7): "A lion has come up from its thicket," and he says also (48:40): "like an eagle he shall soar." until its wings were plucked Its wings were plucked, which is an allusion to its downfall. resembling a bear This represents the kingdom of Persia, which will reign after Babylon, who eats and drinks like a bear and is enwrapped in flesh like a bear. and it stood to one side and it stood to one side, indicating that when the kingdom of Babylon terminates, Persia will wait one year, when Media will reign. and there were three ribs in its mouth Aram. וּתְלָת עִלָעִין בְּפֻמַּהּ, three ribs. Our Sages explained that three provinces were constantly rebelling against it [i.e., Persia] and making peace with it; sometimes it would swallow them and sometimes spit them out. That is the meaning of "in its mouth between its teeth," sometimes outside its teeth, sometimes inside (Kid. 72a), but I say that the three עִלָעִין are three kings who will rise from Persia: Cyrus, Ahasuerus, and Darius who built the Temple. four wings... four heads They are the four rulers to whom Alexander of Macedon allotted his kingdom at his death, as is written in the book of Joseph ben Gurion (Book 3, ch. 14), for this third beast is the kingdom of Antiochus, and it is called נָמֵר because it issued decrees upon Israel [which were] spotted (מְנֻמָּרוֹת) and varied one from the other. and... ten horns Aram. וְקַרְנַיִן עֲשַׂר. The angel explained to him that these are the ten kings who would ascend [the throne] of Rome before Vespasian, who would destroy the Temple. speaking arrogantly words of arrogance. That is Titus, about whom the Rabbis, of blessed memory, said (Gittin 56b) that he blasphemed and berated and entered the Heichal with brazenness."
- Daniel 7:25 " until a time, two times, and half a time This is an obscure end, as was said to Daniel (12:4): "And you, Daniel, close up the words and seal," and the early commentators expounded on it, each one according to his view, and the ends have passed. We can still interpret it as I saw written in the name of Rav Saadia Gaon, that they are the 1,335 years stated at the end of the Book (12:12): "Fortunate is he who waits [and reaches the days one thousand three hundred and thirty-five]," and he explains the appointed time as until the time of two times and a half time, and he [Rav Saadia Gaon] said that the times are 480 [years], which is the time from the Exodus from Egypt until the Temple was built, and 410 [years], [which are] the days of the First Temple, totaling 890, and another half of this time, 445, totaling 1,335. Figure these from the time the daily sacrifice was discontinued until the daily sacrifice will be restored to its place; it was discontinued six years prior to the destruction, and there is somewhat of a proof in this Book. [See Rashi to 8:14.] Others bring further proof to this computation, namely that (Deut. 31: 18): "And I, will hide My face" [the words] הַסְתֵּר אַסְתִּיר add up in gematria to 1,335."
- Daniel 8:14 " Until evening and morning, two thousand and three hundred I saw an interpretation in the name of Rav Saadia Gaon for this matter, but it has already passed, and he interpreted further "until evening and morning," that evening about which it says (Zech. 14:7): "and it shall come to pass that at eventide it shall be light," and we are confident that our God's word will stand forever; it will not be nullified. I say, however, that the עֶרֶב and בֹּקֶר stated here are a gematria, and there is support for this matter from two reasons: 1) that this computation should coincide with the other computation at the end of the Book, and 2) that Gabriel said to Daniel later on in this chapter (verse 26): "And the vision of the evening and the morning is true." Now, if he had not hinted that the computation was doubtful, why did he repeat it to say that it was true? And the seer was commanded to close up and to seal the matter, and to him, too, the matter was revealed in a closed and sealed expression, but we will hope for the promise of our king for end after end, and when the end passes, it will be known that the expounder has erred in his interpretation, and the one who comes after him will search and expound in another manner. This can be interpreted [as follows]: namely, that עֶרֶב בֹּקֶר has the numerical value of 574, ע = 70; ר = 200; ב = 2; ב = 2; ק = 100; ר = 200. Added together, this equals 574; plus 2,300, we have 2,874. and the holy ones shall be exonerated The iniquity of Israel shall be expiated to bring an end to the decrees of their being trodden upon and crumbled since they were exiled in their first exile to Egypt, until they will be redeemed and saved with a perpetual salvation by our king Messiah, and this computation terminates at the end of 1, 290 years from the day the daily sacrifice was removed, and that is what is stated at the end of the Book (12:11): "And from the time the daily sacrifice is removed, and the silent abomination placed, will be 1,290 years," and no more, for our king Messiah will come and remove the silent abomination. The daily sacrifice was removed six years before the destruction of the Second Temple, and an image was set up in the Heichal. Now that was the seventeenth day of Tammuz, when Apostomos burned the Torah, put an end to the daily sacrifice, and set up an image in the Heichal, as we learned in Tractate Ta'anith (26b), but for the six years that I mentioned, I have no explicit proof, but there is proof that the daily sacrifice was abolished less than a complete shemittah cycle before the destruction, for so did Daniel prophesy about Titus (9:27): "... and half the week of years [shemittah cycle] he will curtail sacrifice and meal-offering," meaning that a part of the week of years before the destruction, sacrifices will be abolished. So it is explained below in this section. Let us return to the earlier matters, how the computation of "evening and morning, two thousand and three hundred," fits exactly with the time commencing from the descent to Egypt to terminate at the end of 1,290 years until the day that the daily sacrifice was abolished: 210 years they were in Egypt. 480 years transpired from the Exodus until the building of the Temple. 410 years the Temple existed. 70 years was the Babylonian exile. 420 years the Second Temple stood. 1,290 should be added until the end of days, totaling: 2,880. Subtract six years that the daily sacrifice was removed before the destruction, for Scripture counted 1,290 years only from the time that the daily sacrifice was removed. Here you have the computation of "evening and morning, and 2,300" added to the computation. Fortunate is he who waits and reaches the end of days 45 years over 1,290 [years]. We may say that the king Messiah will come according to the first computation, and he will subsequently be concealed from them for forty-five years. Rabbi Elazar HaKalir established (in the concluding poem of the portion dealing with the month of Nissan): in the foundation of his song: six weeks of years, totaling 42. We may say that the three years that did not total a week of years he did not count. And I found it so in Midrash Ruth that the king Messiah is destined to be concealed for forty-five years after he reveals himself, and proof is brought from these verses."
- Daniel 12:11–12 " And from the time the daily sacrifice was removed in order to place a silent abomination in its stead, are days of one thousand two hundred and ninety years since the daily sacrifice was removed until it will be restored in the days of our King Messiah, and this calculation coincides with the calculation of (8:14): "evening and morning, two thousand and three hundred" from the day of their exile to Egypt until the final redemption: Egyptian exile 210; From their Exodus until the First Temple 480; First Temple 410; Babylonian exile 70; Second Temple 420; Totaling 1590. The daily sacrifice was removed six years before the destruction, which equals 1584. Add 1290, and the total sum is 2874; like the numerical value of בֹּקֶר עֶרֶב [574] plus 2300 [2874]." Fortunate is he who waits etc. Forty five years are added to the above number, for our King Messiah is destined to be hidden after he is revealed and to be revealed again. So we find in Midrash Ruth, and so did Rabbi Eleazar HaKalir establish (in the concluding poem of the morning service of the portion dealing with the month of Nissan): "and he will be concealed from them six weeks of years."
- Ezekiel 29:11 " neither shall it be inhabited for forty years Forty-two years of famine were decreed in Pharaoh's dream, corresponding to the three times the dream is written. He saw seven bad cows and seven bad ears of grain (Gen. 41) and he told it to Joseph; hence we have [it mentioned] twice, and Joseph said to him, "The seven thin and bad cows and the seven empty ears," totaling forty-two for the famine. But they had only two, as it is stated (ibid. 45:6): "For it is two years now that the famine has been on earth," and when Jacob came down to Egypt, the famine ceased, for behold in the third year they sowed, as it is stated (ibid. 47:19): "and then you give us seed that we may live etc.," and the forty years were paid to them now: "neither shall it be inhabited for forty years." תֵּשֵּׁב means sera asijiee in Old French. will be settled, peopled."
- Ezekiel 29:21 " On that day will I cause the horn of the House of Israel to blossom out I have neither heard nor found the explanation of this verse. What is the blossoming of the horn of Israel in the downfall of Egypt? Was not Israel exiled eight years before the downfall of Egypt? [Therefore,] I say that "On that day" refers back to the above section, (verse 13): "At the end of forty years, I will gather the Egyptians." That count ends in the year that Belshazzar assumed the throne, and we find in Daniel that in that year the kings of Persia began to gain strength, and downfall was decreed upon Babylon, as it is said (Dan. 7:1): "In the first year of Belshazzar,... Daniel saw a dream, etc."; (verse 4) "The first one was like a lion" - that is Babylon. And it is written (ad loc.): "I saw until its wings were plucked off, etc. (verse 5) And behold another, second beast, resembling a bear" that is Persia. And it is written (ad loc.) "And thus it was said to it, 'Devour much flesh.'" i.e., seize the kingdom. And the kingdom of Persia was the blossoming of the horn of Israel, as it is said regarding Cyrus (Isa. 45:13): "He shall build My city and free My exiles." Now, how do we know that the forty years of Egypt ended at that time? [The proof is that] Egypt was given into the hands of Nebuchadnezzar in the twenty-seventh [year] of Nebuchadnezzar, in the year that this prophecy was said to Ezekiel. Add forty years, and you have sixty-seven. Deduct from them forty-five for Nebuchadnezzar and twenty-three for Evil-Merodach, as we say in Megillah (11b), one of these years counting for both [kings], as we say there: "they were incomplete years."
- Ezekiel 30:4 " and there will be quaking in Cush [Heb. חַלְחָלָה,] expression of trembling. When they hear of Egypt's downfall, they will fear for their lives: perhaps the king of Babylon will rise up against them."
- Ezekiel 30:18 " a cloud will cover her Trouble will come upon her and cover her, and it will become dark [for her] like a day covered with clouds."
- Ezekiel 30:21 " I have broken the arm of Pharaoh, the king of Egypt already another time, for I placed his army in the hands of Nebuchadnezzar in the fourth year of Jehoiakim, as it is said in the Book of Jeremiah (46:2): "Concerning Egypt, concerning the army of Pharaoh-neco, the king of Egypt, which was on the Euphrates in Carcemish, whom Nebuchadnezzar king smote, etc." and behold, it was not bound from that day on, as it is said at the end of the Book of Kings (II 24:7): "And the king of Egypt no longer went out of his land, for the king of Babylonia had taken from the river of Egypt," and with this expression Jeremiah, too, prophesied concerning that blow, using the language "it has no cure," as it is said (Jer. 46:11): "Go up to Gilead and take balm, O virgin daughter of Egypt; in vain you have increased medicines, you have no cure." חֻבָּשָּׁה is an expression of binding, for they bind the broken bone."
- Jeremiah 12:14–15 " My wicked neighbors Egypt, Ammon and Moab, Tyre and Sidon, who were neighbors of Eretz Israel and were inflicting harm upon them. I will return and have pity on them They all suffered close to the destruction of the Temple, and concerning each one it is stated in this Book, "I will return the exile of..."
- Jeremiah 33:18 " for all time There shall not be cut off from them seed fit to offer up a burnt-offering or to burn a meal-offering."
- Jeremiah 34:5 " You shall die in peace Our Sages stated that Nebuchadnezzar died during his lifetime (Moed Katan 28b), for all the days of Nebuchadnezzar his prisoners were not freed from their imprisonment, and when Nebuchadnezzar died, Zedekiah emerged from the prison. He died the next day and was buried with pomp."
- Isaiah 7:9 " if you do not believe My prophecy, you, Ahaz, and his people, for I know that you are wicked.
- Isaiah 7:14 " the young woman My wife will conceive this year. This was the fourth year of Ahaz. Immanuel [lit. God is with us. That is] to say that our Rock shall be with us, and this is the sign, for she is a young girl, and she never prophesied, yet in this instance, Divine inspiration shall rest upon her. This is what is stated below (8:3): "And I was intimate with the prophetess, etc.," and we do not find a prophet's wife called a prophetess unless she prophesied. Some interpret this as being said about Hezekiah, but it is impossible, because, when you count his years, you find that Hezekiah was born nine years before his father's reign. And some interpret that this is the sign, that she was a young girl and incapable of giving birth."
- Isaiah 13:17 " Behold I stir up Media against them Darius the Mede assassinated Belshazzar. So Scripture states (Dan. 5:30): "On that very night, Belshazzar... was slain"; (ibid. 6:1) "And Darius the Mede acquired the kingdom."
- Isaiah 13:22 " and her days The days of her flourishing shall not be extended, for Israel was promised (Jer. 29: 10): "When seventy years of Babylon are over, I will remember you." And that remembering will be through Cyrus king of Persia, who will take the kingdom from Babylon after Darius the Mede, for they both, Media and Persia, joined over it, [i.e., over Babylon,] and stipulated between themselves, if the kings are from us, the governors are from you."
- Isaiah 17:2 " The cities of Aroer are abandoned Jonathan renders this as an expression of destruction. Comp. (Jer. 51:58) "shall be destroyed (עַרְעֵר תִּתְעַרְעַר), and he explained it in reference to the cities of Aram, i.e., Jonathan renders it: Their cities are abandoned, they are destroyed. The Midrash Aggadah (introduction to Lam. Rabbah 10 [with variations], Yalkut Machin) asks in amazement, since Aroer was [part] of Eretz Israel, as it is said (Num. 32:34): " and Aroer." He is dealing with Damascus and he announces matters concerning Aroer? But, since in Damascus there were streets as numerous as the days of the solar year, and in each one was a pagan deity, which they would worship one day in the year, and the Israelites made them all into one group and worshipped all of them every day, he, therefore, mentioned the downfall of Aroer juxtaposed to Damascus. I explain it, however, according to the simple meaning of the verse, as follows: Since Rezin and Pekah son of Remaliah joined together, and the prophet prophesying about the downfall of Damascus, and saying, " Behold, Damascus shall be removed from [being] a city," and the cities of Aroer which belonged to Pekah were already abandoned, for the Reubenites and the Gadites had already been exiled, and they were always given to the flocks of sheep, and the sheep of Moab would lie there undisturbed, he continues to say that the kingdom of Pekah shall continue to be gradually terminated, and that Samaria, too, shall be captured in the days of Hoshea, and then (v. 3) And a fortress shall cease from Ephraim and a kingdom from Damascusfor Rezin shall be killed."
- Isaiah 19:5 " And water from the sea shall dry up And the sea shall not return the Nile to its source, but the Nile will descend into it and will not ascend to water Egypt."
- Isaiah 19:17 " And the land of Judah shall be to Egypt for a dread When those remaining in Egypt from the captivity of Sennacherib hear of his downfall, that he will fall in the land of Judah without any physical warfare, they will know that the Divine Presence is manifest in Israel and that their Savior is mighty, and they will fear and be frightened of the land of Judah."
- Isaiah 19:18 " On that day there shall be five cities, etc. We learned in Seder Olam (ch. 23): Following Sennacherib's defeat, Hezekiah stood up and released the armies he had brought with him from Egypt and from Cush in chains before Jerusalem, and they imposed upon themselves the kingdom of heaven, and returned to their place, and it is said: "On that day there shall be five cities, etc." They went and built an altar to the Lord in the land of Egypt and they would sacrifice on it to heaven, to fulfill what was said: On that day there shall be an altar to the Lord in the land of Egypt. Some of our Sages expounded it in the tractate Menahoth (109b) as referring to the altar of the temple of Onias the son of Simon the Just, who fled to Egypt and built an altar there."
- Isaiah 19:23–25 " there shall be a highway And there shall be a paved road by which they will always go from Egypt to Assyria. and Assyria shall come upon Egypt Jonathan renders: And the Assyrians shall wage war with the Egyptians. Israel shall be a third to Egypt and to Assyria for a blessing, since there was no prominent nation in the world at that time like Egypt and like Assyria, and the Jews were humble in the days of Ahaz and in the days of Hoshea the son of Elah. And the prophet states that, through the miracle that will be performed for Hezekiah, Israel's name will be greatly magnified, and they will be as prominent as one of these kingdoms in regards to blessing and greatness. Which...blessed them [lit. him,] i.e., Israel. Blessed is My people Israel, whom I chose for Myself as a people when they were in Egypt. and the work of My hands I showed them with the mighty deeds I performed wondrously against Assyria, and through those miracles they will repent and be as though I just made them anew, and they will be My heritage, Israel. Jonathan paraphrased this in a similar manner."
- Zechariah 10:11 " the waves of the sea to sink Tyre."
- Obadiah 1:18 " for the Lord has spoken Now where did He speak? (Num. 24:19) "Out of Jacob shall come a ruler, and he shall destroy him that remains in the city." [from Mechilta Bo 12:16, Pirkei d'Rabbi Eliezer ch.37]"
- Haggai 2:6 " and I will shake up with the miracles performed for the Hasmoneans. the heaven, etc. And they will understand that My Shechinah rests in this House, and they will bring gifts of silver and gold, as is written in the book of Joseph ben Gurion."

== Muhammad ==
These passages have been interpreted by some Muslim scholars as prophetic references to Muhammad. The following are Muslim scholars' interpretations of various Biblical passages. Some Rabbis have also seen Islam as the fulfillment of biblical prophecies such as the first example cited below.

- Rabbi Bahya ben Asher writes the following in his commentary on Genesis 17:20 where God promises to bless Ishmael with a great nation:

" "and I will make him into a great nation." Rabbeinu Chananel wrote: we note that this prophecy was fulfilled for them only after 2333 years. [Rabbi Chavell writes that this is an accurate number seeing that Avraham was circumcised in the year 2047 after the creation. The Islamic religion was founded in the year 4374 after the creation. Allow for another ten years until it started spreading throughout the world and you will arrive at the number 2333 after Avraham was circumcised, the date of this prediction.] This delay was not due to their sins as they had been looking forward to fulfillment of the prophecy during all those years. Once the prophecy came true Islam conquered the civilized world like a whirlwind. We, the Jewish people, lost our position of pre-eminence in the world due to our sins. Seeing that at the time of writing we have yearned for the fulfillment of the prophecy that we will be redeemed for a mere 1330 years, we certainly have no reason to abandon hope that it will be fulfilled."

- Genesis 21:13, 18 – God promises to make Ishmael a great nation. Ishmael is the half brother of Isaac, the father of the Jews.
- Deuteronomy 18:18 and 33:1, 2 – God promises to raise a prophet who would be among the brethren of the Jews and like unto Moses. Muslim scholars interpret "brethren" as a reference to Ishmaelites, the ancestors of Muhammad. Muslims believe that Muhammad resembled Moses as a married father; warrior; law-giver; who was forced to immigrate; and raised by non-parents.
- Habakkuk 3:3 – Muhammad's migration from Mecca to Medina. Since according to Genesis 21:21 the wilderness of Paran was the place where Ishmael settled (i.e. Arabia, specifically Mecca).
- Isaiah 21:13–17 – Arabia is the land of the promised one.
- John 1:19–25 has John the Baptist being asked if he was "the Prophet" after denying he was the Messiah or Elijah. Islamic preacher Ahmed Deedat said this was a prophecy of Muhammad.
- John 14:16, 15:26, 16:7 and John 18:36 – These verses describe a Paraclete or comforter. John 14:26, identifies it as the Holy Spirit, while Muslim scholars doubt the underlying meaning of the term.
- John 16:12–14 – Comforter was to bring complete teachings. Christians actually believe this prophecy was the outpouring of the Holy Spirit on the day of Pentecost.
- Matthew 21:42–44 – The rejected stone according to Islamic understanding of these passages is the nation of Ishmael's descendants which was victorious against all super-powers of its time. "The kingdom of God shall be taken from you, and given to a nation bringing forth the fruits thereof. And whosoever shall fall on this stone shall be broken: but on whomsoever it shall fall, it will grind him to powder."
- Acts 3:20–22 – Muhammad to come before the second advent of Jesus
- Rev. 11:3 – The Baháʼí Faith identifies the "two witnesses" to be Muhammad and Ali, who would prophesy for "1260 days." The year 1260 AH in the Islamic calendar (1844 AD) marks the beginning of the Baháʼí Faith, the year of the declaration of its herald, the Báb.

== The Báb and Bahá'u'lláh ==
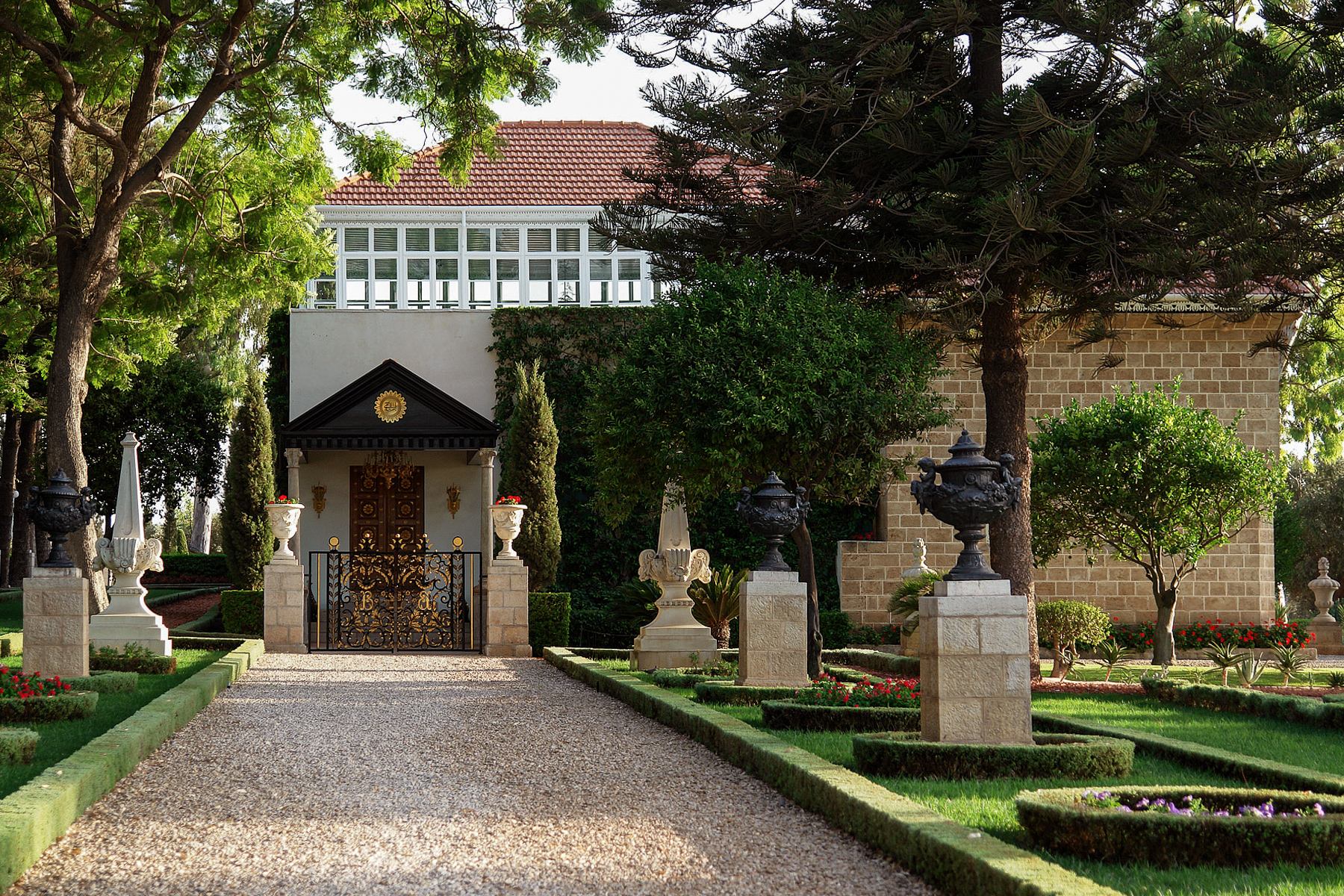
The Shrine of Bahá'u'lláh, in Bahjí near Acre, Israel

Followers of the Baháʼí Faith believe that Bahá'u'lláh is the return of Christ "in the glory of the Father" and that the passages below were fulfilled by the coming of the Báb and Bahá'u'lláh, in 1844 AD and 1863 AD, respectively.

- Daniel 8:14 – According to the day-year principle, this period of 2300 days is interpreted as 2300 years. Beginning in the year of an edict by Artaxerxes to rebuild Jerusalem (457 B.C.), this period ends in the year 1844 AD.
- Jeremiah 49:38 – Prophesies Elam (Persia) as the place that the Lord will set His throne. The Baháʼí Faith began in Persia, the birthplace of the Báb and Bahá'u'lláh.
- Ezekiel 43:1–4 – "Afterward he brought me to the gate, the gate facing east. And behold, the glory of the God of Israel came from the east... As the glory of the Lord entered the temple by the gate facing east." Bahá'u'lláh is Arabic for "The Glory of God," and the forerunner of Bahá'u'lláh who prepared the way for Him was the Báb, whose name means "the Gate."
- Micah 7:12–15 – Prophesies the place of the second appearance of Christ. Bahá'u'lláh proclaimed He was the Promised One in Baghdad, one of the main centers of the Assyrian Empire.
- Revelation 11 – Refers to a period of 1260 years, "the cycle of the Qur'án," which ends in the year 1844 AD (the year 1260 of the Islamic calendar).
- Revelation 12:1–6 – Refers again to a period of 1260 years according to the day-year principle (see above).

== Book of Mormon ==
Latter-Day Saints believe that the following biblical passages prophesy or otherwise support the provenance of the Book of Mormon:

- Gold plates to come out of the earth – "Truth shall spring out of the earth; and righteousness shall look down from heaven." (Psalm 85:11)
- Assumed prophecy about coming judgment and the Book of Mormon ending the Great Apostasy. – "And thou shalt be brought down, and shalt speak out of the ground, and thy speech shall be low out of the dust, and thy voice shall be, as of one that hath a familiar spirit, out of the ground, and thy speech shall whisper out of the dust...Stay yourselves, and wonder; cry ye out, and cry: they are drunken, but not with wine; they stagger, but not with strong drink. For the LORD hath poured out upon you the spirit of deep sleep, and hath closed your eyes: the prophets and your rulers, the seers hath he covered. And the vision of all is become unto you as the words of a book that is sealed, which men deliver to one that is learned, saying, Read this, I pray thee: and he saith, I cannot; for it is sealed: and the book is delivered to him that is not learned, saying, Read this, I pray thee: and he saith, I am not learned. Wherefore the Lord said, Forasmuch as this people draw near me with their mouth, and with their lips do honour me, but have removed their heart far from me, and their fear toward me is taught by the precept of men: therefore, behold, I will proceed to do a marvellous work among this people, even a marvellous work and a wonder: for the wisdom of their wise men shall perish, and the understanding of their prudent men shall be hid... And in that day shall the deaf hear the words of the book, and the eyes of the blind shall see out of obscurity, and out of darkness." (Isaiah 29)
- Book of Mormon = Stick of Joseph; the Bible = Stick of Judah – "The word of the LORD came again unto me, saying, Moreover, thou son of man, take thee one stick, and write upon it, For Judah, and for the children of Israel his companions: then take another stick, and write upon it, For Joseph, the stick of Ephraim, and for all the house of Israel his companions: And join them one to another into one stick; and they shall become one in thine hand. And when the children of thy people shall speak unto thee, saying, Wilt thou not shew us what thou meanest by these? Say unto them, Thus saith the Lord GOD; Behold, I will take the stick of Joseph, which is in the hand of Ephraim, and the tribes of Israel his fellows, and will put them with him, even with the stick of Judah, and make them one stick, and they shall be one in mine hand. And the sticks whereon thou writest shall be in thine hand before their eyes."(Ezekiel 37: 15–20)
- Moroni thought to be the angel bringing the gospel in the form of the Book of Mormon – "And I saw another angel fly in the midst of heaven, having the everlasting gospel to preach unto them that dwell on the earth, and to every nation, and kindred, and tongue, and people, Saying with a loud voice, Fear God, and give glory to him; for the hour of his judgment is come: and worship him that made heaven, and earth, and the sea, and the fountains of waters." (Revelation 14:6, 7)

== Use by conservative Christians ==
Biblical prophecy is believed to be literally true by a number of conservative Christians, such as Norman Geisler and Young Earth Creationists. Interpreters uphold this principle by providing details of prophecies that have been fulfilled. Interpreters also dispute the legitimacy of non-biblical prophets and psychics. Professor Peter Stoner and Dr. Hawley O. Taylor, for example, believed the Bible prophecies were too remarkable and detailed to occur by chance. Arthur C. Custance maintained that the Ezekiel Tyre prophecy (Ezek. 26: 1–11; 29:17–20) was remarkable.

These interpretive issues are related to the more general idea of how passages should be read or interpreted—a concept known as Biblical hermeneutics. Bible prophecy is an area which is often discussed in regard to Christian apologetics. Traditional Jewish readings of the Bible do not generally reflect the same attention to the details of prophecies. Maimonides stated that Moses was the greatest of the prophets and only he experienced direct revelation. Concern with Moses' revelation involves law and ethical teaching more than predictive prophecy. According to Maimonides' Guide for the Perplexed the prophets used metaphors and analogies and, except for Moses, their words are not to be taken literally.

According to the Talmud, prophecy ceased in Israel following the rebuilding of the second temple. Nonetheless Maimonides held that a prophet can be identified if his or her predictions come true.

== Multiple fulfillments ==
Many scholarly and popular interpreters have argued that a prophecy may have a dual fulfillment; others have argued for the possibility of multiple fulfillments. In some senses this has been occasionally referred to as an apotelesmatic interpretation of specific prophecies.

In Christian eschatology, the idea of at least a dual fulfillment is usually applied to passages in the apocalyptic books of Daniel or Revelation, and to the apocalyptic discourse of Jesus in the synoptic gospels (Matthew 24, Mark 13, Luke 21), especially in interpretations that predict a future tribulation and a future Antichrist figure. Futurists and Historicists usually hold to variations of this view, while Preterists see the same passages as applying only to events and persecutions from the time of Daniel through the first century CE. Some who believe in multiple fulfillment tend to restrict the idea to a view of history where ancient events reflecting Israel and first-century Judaism and Christianity are predictors of larger future events to happen on a global scale at a point in time, while others tend to include symbolic applications of prophecies to multiple entities and events throughout history.

Henry Kett suggested multiple fulfillments in his 1799 book History the Interpreter of Prophecy, in which he outlined numerous fulfillments for Antichrist prophecies, with chapters on the "Papal power", "Mahometanism" and "Infidelity" as parts of a long series of fulfillments of the prophecies.

Samuel Horsley (1733–1806) stated "The application of the prophecy to any one of these events bears all the characteristics of a true interpretation".

Moses Stuart (1780–1852) differentiated the idea that a prophetic passage has an inherent dual sense or double meaning from the idea of a later application of the prophecy in subsequent events, separate from the original prophecy: "In these principles there is no double sense; no ὑπόνοια [huponoia or "suspicion"], in the sense in which that word is usually employed and understood. But there may be an apotelesmatic view or sense of a passage in the ancient Scriptures; and this is the case whenever a proceeding or a principle is reillustrated or reconfirmed. This makes out no double sense, but a fuller and more complete exhibition of the one and simple meaning of the original. Well may it be named a πλήρωσις [plerosis or "fulfillment / fulfilling"]." Stuart noted prior usage of the term "apotelesmatic" by European interpreters.

Other interpreters have referred to an apotelesmatic meaning of prophecy as a collapsing of perspective of "near" and "far" or "inaugurated" and "consummated" fulfillments, where from the viewpoint of the ancient Israelite prophet local events affecting Israel are merged with end-time cosmic events relating to the kingdom of God.

C. F. Keil (1807–1888) suggested in an influential commentary "this uniting together of the two events is not to be explained only from the perspective and apotelesmatic character of the prophecy, but has its foundation in the very nature of the thing itself. The prophetic perspective, by virtue of which the inward eye of the seer beholds only the elevated summits of historical events as they unfold themselves, and not the valleys of the common incidents of history which lie between these heights, is indeed peculiar to prophecy in general, and accounts for the circumstance that the prophecies as a rule give no fixed dates, and apotelesmatically bind together the points of history which open the way to the end, with the end itself."

Seventh-day Adventist theologian Desmond Ford (Historicist) termed this belief the apotelesmatic principle and stated "The ultimate fulfillment is the most comprehensive in scope, though details of the original forecast may be limited to the first fulfillment."

On the other hand, Dispensational Futurist theologian Randall Price applies the term "apotelesmatic" primarily to the sense of "prophetic postponement" or "an interruption in fulfillment" that dispensationalists hold occurs between the sixty-ninth and seventieth weeks of the seventy weeks prophecy of Daniel 9:24–27: "The technical expression for this delay in the fulfillment of the messianic program for Israel is derived from the Greek verb apotelo meaning, 'to bring to completion, finish.' The usual sense of telos as 'end' or 'goal' may here have the more technical idea of 'the consummation that comes to prophecies when they are fulfilled' (Luke 22:37). With the prefix apo, which basically has the connotation of 'separation from something,' the idea is of a delay or interruption in the completion of the prophetic program. Therefore, apotelesmatic interpretation recognizes that in Old Testament texts that present the messianic program as a single event, a near and far historical fulfillment is intended, separated by an indeterminate period of time. Dispensational writers have referred to this as an 'intercalation' or a 'gap.' However, prophetic postponement better expresses this concept."

Halley's Bible Handbook, the Scofield Reference Bible and many other Bible commentaries hold that the "little horn" of Daniel 8 is fulfilled both with Antiochus Epiphanes (reigned 175–164 BC) and with a future Antichrist. Henry Kett, taking the writings of Sir Isaac Newton, advanced to identifying three fulfillments: Antiochus Epiphanes, the Romans, and a future Antichrist. Several Historicist interpreters (Faber, Bickersteth, Keith, Elliott, etc.) proposed the same, but noted that the Roman Empire is classified in two forms, the Pagan and the Papal, and that the Roman Empire was also split (East and West), and that in the East Mohammed or his religion were also meant, and more particularly the Turks, and that the final form (particularly according to authors writing after the Crimean War of 1853–1856) was Russia.

Methodist theologian Adam Clarke (ca 1761–1832) concurred with Anglican bishop Thomas Newton (1704–1782) that the abomination of desolation as a proverbial phrase could include multiple events "substituted in the place of, or set up in opposition to, the ordinances of God, his worship, his truth, etc." This allows for viewing some, or all of the following events as partial fulfillments of this prophecy simultaneously:

- the re-dedication of the Second Temple in Jerusalem to Zeus by Antiochus IV Epiphanes in 167 BC
- the worship of the Roman standards on the Temple Mount under Titus in 70 AD
- the building of the Dome of the Rock by the Umayyad Caliph Abd al-Malik ibn Marwan in circa 690 AD

The British Israelist Howard Rand (1963) wrote, "because men have been able to see one—and only one—fulfillment, they have missed the greater scope of this prophecy and their understanding of the full message has been thwarted. ... Too, because of the double, triple and quadruple applications of this prophecy to world events, an enormous amount of history is involved in the cryptogrammic language of the vision."

== Future ==
=== End times ===
Among most Christian denominations, the prophecy that Jesus will return to Earth is a major doctrine, which can be seen by its inclusion in the Nicene Creed. Many specific timeframes for this prediction have been declared by individuals and groups, although many of these dates have expired without the occurrences predicted. An official statement of the Vatican, issued in 1993, asserted, "we are already in the last hour".

Biblical references claimed to prophesy the end times include:

- Isaiah 2:2–3 The Old Testament prophet Isaiah prophesied that in the end times the Kingdom of God would be established in Jerusalem, as chief among the nations. This prophecy was also asserted by Micah of Moreseth.
- Hosea 3:4–5 The Old Testament prophet Hosea indicated that in the end times Israel would return to their land and seek the Lord their God.
- Matthew 24:14 This prophecy predicts that the gospel will be preached globally before the end occurs.
- Acts 2:17–20 The Apostle Peter said that in the end times, God would pour out His spirit on all people and show signs in the heaven and on the earth before the coming great and dreadful Day of the Lord.
- 2 Timothy 3:1–13 The Apostle Paul wrote that there would be terrible times in the end times. People would have a form of godliness but denying its power and moral decay will increase.
- Hebrews 1:2 The author of Hebrews wrote that the world was already in the end times.
- James 5:3–5 James wrote that people would hoard wealth in the end times to their destruction.
- 2 Peter 3:3–8 The Apostle Peter indicated that in the end times even religious people would dismiss the idea of Christ's return.

== See also ==
- Abomination of desolation
- Antichrist
- Apocalyptic literature
- Christian eschatology
- Christian theology
- Christian Zionism
- Covenant theology
- Day-year principle
- Dispensationalism
- False prophet
- Gathering of Israel
- Jewish messianism
- Jesus and messianic prophecy
- New Covenant
- Predictions and claims for the Second Coming of Christ
- Postdiction
- Posttribulation rapture
- Prophets of Christianity
- Rapture
- Second Coming
- Two witnesses
- Unfulfilled Christian religious predictions
- Vaticinium ex eventu
- Whore of Babylon
