= Psalm 22 =

Chapter of book in Ketuvim and Old Testament Bibles

- "My God, my God, why hast thou forsaken me?"
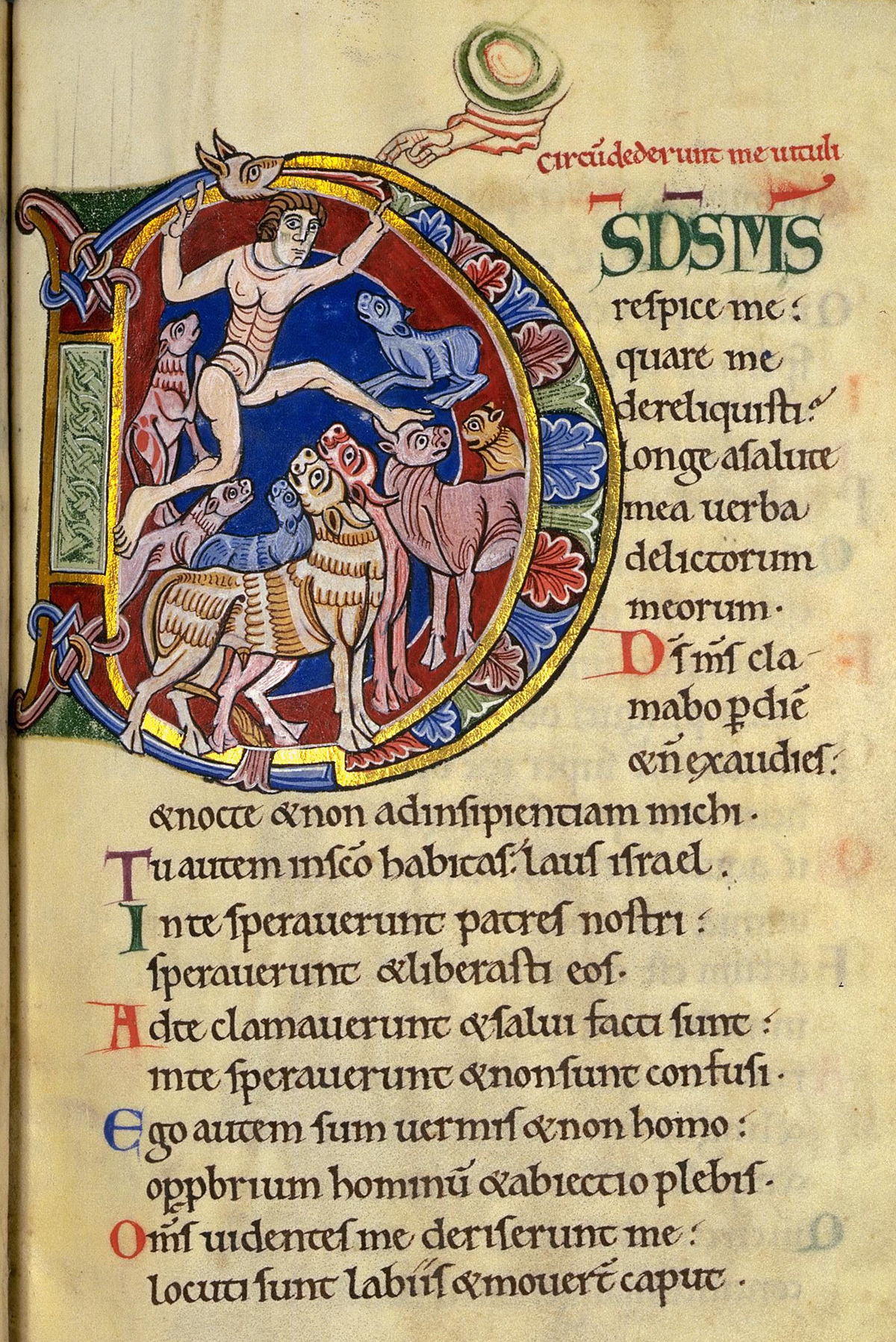
- Psalm 22:1-8 in the St. Albans Psalter. The first words of the Psalm in the Latin Vulgate are "Deus, Deus meus," abbreviated here as DS DS MS.
- Other name: Psalm 21; "Deus, Deus meus"
- Language: Hebrew (original)

Psalm 22
- ← Psalm 21 Psalm 23 →
- Book: Book of Psalms
- Hebrew Bible part: Ketuvim
- Order in the Hebrew part: 1
- Category: Sifrei Emet
- Christian Bible part: Old Testament
- Order in the Christian part: 19

Psalm 22 of the Book of Psalms (the hind of the dawn) or My God, my God, why hast thou forsaken me? (Note: Text according to the King James Version.) is a psalm in the Bible.

The Book of Psalms is part of the third section of the Tanakh, and a book of the Old Testament of the Bible. In the slightly different numbering system used in the Greek Septuagint and Latin Vulgate translations of the Bible, this psalm is Psalm 21. In Latin, it is known as Deus, Deus meus.

The psalm forms a regular part of Jewish, Orthodox, Catholic, Anglican and Lutheran liturgies in addition to Protestant psalmody.

== History and context ==
In the most general sense, Psalm 22 is about a person who is crying out to God to save him from the taunts and torments of his enemies, and (in the last ten verses) thanking God for rescuing him.

Jewish interpretations of Psalm 22 identify the individual in the psalm with a royal figure, usually King David or Queen Esther.

The psalm is also interpreted as referring to the plight of the Jewish people and their distress and alienation in exile. For instance, the phrase "But I am a worm" (Hebrew: ואנכי תולעת) refers to Israel, similarly to Isaiah 41: "Fear not, thou worm Jacob, and ye men of Israel; I help thee, saith the LORD, and thy Redeemer, the Holy One of Israel."

Tractate Megillah of the Babylonian Talmud contains an extended collection of midrash expanding on the Book of Esther. Commenting on Esther 5:1, Rabbi Levi is quoted saying that, as Esther passed through the hall of idols on the way to the throne room to plead with the king, she felt the Shekhinah (divine presence) leaving her, at which point she quoted Psalm 22:1 saying "My God, my God, why have you forsaken me."

=== Heading ===
To the Chief Musician. Set to "The Deer of the Dawn". A Psalm of David.

Ayelet Hashachar (Hebrew: "hind of the dawn") is found in the title of the psalm. It is probably the name of some song or tune to the measure of which the psalm was to be chanted. Some, however, understand by the name some instrument of music, or an allegorical allusion to the subject of the psalms. In the recent literature, however, it is argued that "Hind of Dawn" is a cultic role of the priest designated person acting as מְנַצֵּחַ (menatseach), as head of the ritual.

Where English translations have "psalm", the underlying Hebrew word is מִזְמוֹר (mizmor), a song with instrumental accompaniment. This is part of the series of "Davidic Psalms" (mizmor le-david). Traditionally, their authorship was attributed to King David; however, in scholarly exegesis this attribution has been variously qualified or challenged since the late 19th century. The Hebrew particle le can mean "for", "about", or "by", so that it remains open to interpretation whether these psalms originate with David, or whether the heading refers, rather, to the chief character of the poetry, as being concerned with Davidic kingship in the narrow sense, or even divine kingship more generally.

The heading further assigns the psalm as "for the conductor" (לַֽמְנַצֵּחַ). This is apparently a reference to the use of psalms in the (temple) liturgy. The exact meaning is unclear.

== Parallels and allusions ==
=== Old Testament ===
In verse 12, the "strong bulls of Bashan" represent "frightening power"; in Amos 4:1 the "cows of Bashan" represent luxury.

=== New Testament ===
The New Testament makes numerous allusions to Psalm 22, mainly during the crucifixion of Jesus.

Verse 1, "My God, my God, why have you forsaken me?", is quoted in Mark 15:34; Matthew 27:46 Codex Vaticanus transliterates this differently from the canonical Greek text. Codex Vaticanus Matthew 27.46 has: Eloey, Eloey, lema sabaktanei which is similar to the old Syriac Psalm 22 Alóhi Alóhi lmóno shbáqthoni. Codex Vaticanus Mark 15.34 has: Eloi, Eloi, lama zabafthanei which matches the Hebrew Psalm 22 (אלי אלי למה עזבתני) Elí, Elí, láma azavtháni.

Verse 7, "They hurl insults, shaking their heads", is quoted in Mark 15:29; Matthew 27:39.

Verse 8, "He trusted on the Lord that he would deliver him: let him deliver him, seeing he delighted in him", is quoted in Matthew 27:43.

Verse 18, "They divide my clothes among them and cast lots for my garment", is quoted in Mark 15:24; Matthew 27:35; Luke 23:34; John 19:24.

Verse 22, "I will declare your name to my people; in the assembly I will praise you", is quoted Hebrews 2:12.

== Text ==
The following table shows the Hebrew text of the Psalm with vowels, alongside the Koine Greek text in the Septuagint and the English translation from the King James Version. Note that the meaning can slightly differ between these versions, as the Septuagint and the Masoretic Text come from different textual traditions. (Note: A 1917 translation directly from Hebrew to English by the Jewish Publication Society can be found here or here, and an 1844 translation directly from the Septuagint by L. C. L. Brenton can be found here. Both translations are in the public domain.) In the Septuagint, this psalm is numbered Psalm 21.

#	Hebrew	English	Greek
(Note: In the Jewish verse numbering, the ascription of this psalm is verse 1, and the rest of the psalm begins from verse 2. However, the Christian verse numbering does not count the ascription as a separate verse.)	לַ֭מְנַצֵּחַ עַל־אַיֶּ֥לֶת הַשַּׁ֗חַר מִזְמ֥וֹר לְדָוִֽד׃	(To the chief Musician upon Aijeleth Shahar, A Psalm of David.)	Εἰς τὸ τέλος, ὑπὲρ τῆς ἀντιλήψεως τῆς ἑωθινῆς· ψαλμὸς τῷ Δαυΐδ. -
1	אֵלִ֣י אֵ֭לִי לָמָ֣ה עֲזַבְתָּ֑נִי רָח֥וֹק מִֽ֝ישׁוּעָתִ֗י דִּבְרֵ֥י שַׁאֲגָתִֽי׃	My God, my God, why hast thou forsaken me? why art thou so far from helping me, and from the words of my roaring?	Ο ΘΕΟΣ, ὁ Θεός μου, πρόσχες μοι· ἵνα τί ἐγκατέλιπές με; μακρὰν ἀπὸ τῆς σωτηρίας μου οἱ λόγοι τῶν παραπτωμάτων μου.
2	אֱֽלֹהַ֗י אֶקְרָ֣א י֭וֹמָם וְלֹ֣א תַעֲנֶ֑ה וְ֝לַ֗יְלָה וְֽלֹא־דֻֽמִיָּ֥ה לִֽי׃	O my God, I cry in the day time, but thou hearest not; and in the night season, and am not silent.	ὁ Θεός μου, κεκράξομαι ἡμέρας, καὶ οὐκ εἰσακούσῃ, καὶ νυκτός, καὶ οὐκ εἰς ἄνοιαν ἐμοί.
3	וְאַתָּ֥ה קָד֑וֹשׁ י֝וֹשֵׁ֗ב תְּהִלּ֥וֹת יִשְׂרָאֵֽל׃	But thou art holy, O thou that inhabitest the praises of Israel.	σὺ δὲ ἐν ἁγίῳ κατοικεῖς, ὁ ἔπαινος τοῦ ᾿Ισραήλ.
4	בְּ֭ךָ בָּטְח֣וּ אֲבֹתֵ֑ינוּ בָּ֝טְח֗וּ וַֽתְּפַלְּטֵֽמוֹ׃	Our fathers trusted in thee: they trusted, and thou didst deliver them.	ἐπὶ σοὶ ἤλπισαν οἱ πατέρες ἡμῶν, ἤλπισαν, καὶ ἐῤῥύσω αὐτούς·
5	אֵלֶ֣יךָ זָעֲק֣וּ וְנִמְלָ֑טוּ בְּךָ֖ בָטְח֣וּ וְלֹא־בֽוֹשׁוּ׃	They cried unto thee, and were delivered: they trusted in thee, and were not confounded.	πρὸς σὲ ἐκέκραξαν καὶ ἐσώθησαν, ἐπὶ σοὶ ἤλπισαν καὶ οὐ κατῃσχύνθησαν.
6	וְאָנֹכִ֣י תוֹלַ֣עַת וְלֹא־אִ֑ישׁ חֶרְפַּ֥ת אָ֝דָ֗ם וּבְז֥וּי עָֽם׃	But I am a worm, and no man; a reproach of men, and despised of the people.	ἐγὼ δέ εἰμι σκώληξ καὶ οὐκ ἄνθρωπος, ὄνειδος ἀνθρώπων καὶ ἐξουθένημα λαοῦ.
7	כׇּל־רֹ֭אַי יַלְעִ֣גוּ לִ֑י יַפְטִ֥ירוּ בְ֝שָׂפָ֗ה יָנִ֥יעוּ רֹֽאשׁ׃	All they that see me laugh me to scorn: they shoot out the lip, they shake the head, saying,	πάντες οἱ θεωροῦντές με ἐξεμυκτήρισάν με, ἐλάλησαν ἐν χείλεσιν, ἐκίνησαν κεφαλήν·
8	גֹּ֣ל אֶל־יְהֹוָ֣ה יְפַלְּטֵ֑הוּ יַ֝צִּילֵ֗הוּ כִּ֘י חָ֥פֵֽץ בּֽוֹ׃	He trusted on the LORD (Note: In the King James Version, the use of small caps for LORD indicates that the Hebrew original reads YHWH. The substitution of "Lord" for the name YHWH is part of an ancient liturgical tradition in both Judaism and Christianity.) that he would deliver him: let him deliver him, seeing he delighted in him.	ἤλπισεν ἐπὶ Κύριον, ῥυσάσθω αὐτόν· σωσάτω αὐτόν, ὅτι θέλει αὐτόν.
9	כִּֽי־אַתָּ֣ה גֹחִ֣י מִבָּ֑טֶן מַ֝בְטִיחִ֗י עַל־שְׁדֵ֥י אִמִּֽי׃	But thou art he that took me out of the womb: thou didst make me hope when I was upon my mother's breasts.	ὅτι σὺ εἶ ὁ ἐκσπάσας με ἐκ γαστρός, ἡ ἐλπίς μου ἀπὸ μαστῶν τῆς μητρός μου·
10	עָ֭לֶיךָ הׇשְׁלַ֣כְתִּי מֵרָ֑חֶם מִבֶּ֥טֶן אִ֝מִּ֗י אֵ֣לִי אָֽתָּה׃	I was cast upon thee from the womb: thou art my God from my mother's belly.	ἐπὶ σὲ ἐπεῤῥίφην ἐκ μήτρας, ἐκ κοιλίας μητρός μου Θεός μου εἶ σύ·
11	אַל־תִּרְחַ֣ק מִ֭מֶּנִּי כִּי־צָרָ֣ה קְרוֹבָ֑ה כִּי־אֵ֥ין עוֹזֵֽר׃	Be not far from me; for trouble is near; for there is none to help.	μὴ ἀποστῇς ἀπ᾿ ἐμοῦ, ὅτι θλῖψις ἐγγύς, ὅτι οὐκ ἔστιν ὁ βοηθῶν.
12	סְ֭בָבוּנִי פָּרִ֣ים רַבִּ֑ים אַבִּירֵ֖י בָשָׁ֣ן כִּתְּרֽוּנִי׃	Many bulls have compassed me: strong bulls of Bashan have beset me round.	περιεκύκλωσάν με μόσχοι πολλοί, ταῦροι πίονες περιέσχον με·
13	פָּצ֣וּ עָלַ֣י פִּיהֶ֑ם אַ֝רְיֵ֗ה טֹרֵ֥ף וְשֹׁאֵֽג׃	They gaped upon me with their mouths, as a ravening and a roaring lion.	ἤνοιξαν ἐπ᾿ ἐμὲ τὸ στόμα αὐτῶν ὡς λέων ἁρπάζων καὶ ὠρυόμενος.
14	כַּמַּ֥יִם נִשְׁפַּכְתִּי֮ וְהִתְפָּֽרְד֗וּ כׇּֽל־עַצְמ֫וֹתָ֥י הָיָ֣ה לִ֭בִּי כַּדּוֹנָ֑ג נָ֝מֵ֗ס בְּת֣וֹךְ מֵעָֽי׃	I am poured out like water, and all my bones are out of joint: my heart is like wax; it is melted in the midst of my bowels.	ὡσεὶ ὕδωρ ἐξεχύθην, καὶ διεσκορπίσθη πάντα τὰ ὀστᾶ μου, ἐγενήθη ἡ καρδία μου ὡσεὶ κηρὸς τηκόμενος ἐν μέσῳ τῆς κοιλίας μου·
15	יָ֘בֵ֤שׁ כַּחֶ֨רֶשׂ ׀ כֹּחִ֗י וּ֭לְשׁוֹנִי מֻדְבָּ֣ק מַלְקוֹחָ֑י וְֽלַעֲפַר־מָ֥וֶת תִּשְׁפְּתֵֽנִי׃	My strength is dried up like a potsherd; and my tongue cleaveth to my jaws; and thou hast brought me into the dust of death.	ἐξηράνθη ὡσεὶ ὄστρακον ἡ ἰσχύς μου, καὶ ἡ γλῶσσά μου κεκόλληται τῷ λάρυγγί μου, καὶ εἰς χοῦν θανάτου κατήγαγές με.
16	כִּ֥י סְבָב֗וּנִי כְּלָ֫בִ֥ים עֲדַ֣ת מְ֭רֵעִים הִקִּיפ֑וּנִי כָּ֝אֲרִ֗י יָדַ֥י וְרַגְלָֽי׃	For dogs have compassed me: the assembly of the wicked have inclosed me: they pierced my hands and my feet.	ὅτι ἐκύκλωσάν με κύνες πολλοί, συναγωγὴ πονηρευομένων περιέσχον με, ὤρυξαν χεῖράς μου καὶ πόδας.
17	אֲסַפֵּ֥ר כׇּל־עַצְמוֹתָ֑י הֵ֥מָּה יַ֝בִּ֗יטוּ יִרְאוּ־בִֽי׃	I may tell all my bones: they look and stare upon me.	ἐξηρίθμησαν πάντα τὰ ὀστᾶ μου, αὐτοὶ δὲ κατενόησαν καὶ ἐπεῖδόν με.
18	יְחַלְּק֣וּ בְגָדַ֣י לָהֶ֑ם וְעַל־לְ֝בוּשִׁ֗י יַפִּ֥ילוּ גוֹרָֽל׃	They part my garments among them, and cast lots upon my vesture.	διεμερίσαντο τὰ ἱμάτιά μου ἑαυτοῖς καὶ ἐπὶ τὸν ἱματισμόν μου ἔβαλον κλῆρον.
19	וְאַתָּ֣ה יְ֭הֹוָה אַל־תִּרְחָ֑ק אֱ֝יָלוּתִ֗י לְעֶזְרָ֥תִי חֽוּשָׁה׃	But be not thou far from me, O LORD: O my strength, haste thee to help me.	σὺ δέ, Κύριε, μὴ μακρύνῃς τὴν βοήθειάν μου ἀπ᾿ ἐμοῦ, εἰς τὴν ἀντίληψίν μου πρόσχες.
20	הַצִּ֣ילָה מֵחֶ֣רֶב נַפְשִׁ֑י מִיַּד־כֶּ֝֗לֶב יְחִידָתִֽי׃	Deliver my soul from the sword; my darling from the power of the dog.	ῥῦσαι ἀπὸ ῥομφαίας τὴν ψυχήν μου, καὶ ἐκ χειρὸς κυνὸς τὴν μονογενῆ μου·
21	ה֭וֹשִׁיעֵנִי מִפִּ֣י אַרְיֵ֑ה וּמִקַּרְנֵ֖י רֵמִ֣ים עֲנִיתָֽנִי׃	Save me from the lion's mouth: for thou hast heard me from the horns of the unicorns.	σῶσόν με ἐκ στόματος λέοντος καὶ ἀπὸ κεράτων μονοκερώτων τὴν ταπείνωσίν μου.
22	אֲסַפְּרָ֣ה שִׁמְךָ֣ לְאֶחָ֑י בְּת֖וֹךְ קָהָ֣ל אֲהַלְלֶֽךָּ׃	I will declare thy name unto my brethren: in the midst of the congregation will I praise thee.	διηγήσομαι τὸ ὄνομά σου τοῖς ἀδελφοῖς μου, ἐν μέσῳ ἐκκλησίας ὑμνήσω σε.
23	יִרְאֵ֤י יְהֹוָ֨ה ׀ הַֽלְל֗וּהוּ כׇּל־זֶ֣רַע יַעֲקֹ֣ב כַּבְּד֑וּהוּ וְג֥וּרוּ מִ֝מֶּ֗נּוּ כׇּל־זֶ֥רַע יִשְׂרָאֵֽל׃	Ye that fear the LORD, praise him; all ye the seed of Jacob, glorify him; and fear him, all ye the seed of Israel.	οἱ φοβούμενοι τὸν Κύριον, αἰνέσατε αὐτόν, ἅπαν τὸ σπέρμα ᾿Ιακώβ, δοξάσατε αὐτόν, φοβηθήτωσαν αὐτὸν ἅπαν τὸ σπέρμα ᾿Ισραήλ,
24	כִּ֤י לֹֽא־בָזָ֨ה וְלֹ֪א שִׁקַּ֡ץ עֱנ֬וּת עָנִ֗י וְלֹא־הִסְתִּ֣יר פָּנָ֣יו מִמֶּ֑נּוּ וּֽבְשַׁוְּע֖וֹ אֵלָ֣יו שָׁמֵֽעַ׃	For he hath not despised nor abhorred the affliction of the afflicted; neither hath he hid his face from him; but when he cried unto him, he heard.	ὅτι οὐκ ἐξουδένωσεν οὐδὲ προσώχθισε τῇ δεήσει τοῦ πτωχοῦ, οὐδὲ ἀπέστρεψε τὸ πρόσωπον αὐτοῦ ἀπ᾿ ἐμοῦ καὶ ἐν τῷ κεκραγέναι με πρὸς αὐτὸν εἰσήκουσέ μου.
25	מֵ֥אִתְּךָ֗ תְּֽהִלָּ֫תִ֥י בְּקָהָ֥ל רָ֑ב נְדָרַ֥י אֲ֝שַׁלֵּ֗ם נֶ֣גֶד יְרֵאָֽיו׃	My praise shall be of thee in the great congregation: I will pay my vows before them that fear him.	παρὰ σοῦ ὁ ἔπαινός μου ἐν ἐκκλησίᾳ μεγάλῃ, τὰς εὐχάς μου ἀποδώσω ἐνώπιον τῶν φοβουμένων αὐτόν.
26	יֹאכְל֬וּ עֲנָוִ֨ים ׀ וְיִשְׂבָּ֗עוּ יְהַֽלְל֣וּ יְ֭הֹוָה דֹּ֣רְשָׁ֑יו יְחִ֖י לְבַבְכֶ֣ם לָעַֽד׃	The meek shall eat and be satisfied: they shall praise the LORD that seek him: your heart shall live for ever.	φάγονται πένητες καὶ ἐμπλησθήσονται, καὶ αἰνέσουσι Κύριον οἱ ἐκζητοῦντες αὐτόν· ζήσονται αἱ καρδίαι αὐτῶν εἰς αἰῶνα αἰῶνος.
27	יִזְכְּר֤וּ ׀ וְיָשֻׁ֣בוּ אֶל־יְ֭הֹוָה כׇּל־אַפְסֵי־אָ֑רֶץ וְיִֽשְׁתַּחֲו֥וּ לְ֝פָנֶ֗יךָ כׇּֽל־מִשְׁפְּח֥וֹת גּוֹיִֽם׃	All the ends of the world shall remember and turn unto the LORD: and all the kindreds of the nations shall worship before thee.	μνησθήσονται καὶ ἐπιστραφήσονται πρὸς Κύριον πάντα τὰ πέρατα τῆς γῆς καὶ προσκυνήσουσιν ἐνώπιον αὐτοῦ πᾶσαι αἱ πατριαὶ τῶν ἐθνῶν,
28	כִּ֣י לַ֭יהֹוָה הַמְּלוּכָ֑ה וּ֝מֹשֵׁ֗ל בַּגּוֹיִֽם׃	For the kingdom is the LORD's: and he is the governor among the nations.	ὅτι τοῦ Κυρίου ἡ βασιλεία, καὶ αὐτὸς δεσπόζει τῶν ἐθνῶν.
29	אָכְל֬וּ וַיִּֽשְׁתַּחֲו֨וּ ׀ כׇּֽל־דִּשְׁנֵי־אֶ֗רֶץ לְפָנָ֣יו יִ֭כְרְעוּ כׇּל־יוֹרְדֵ֣י עָפָ֑ר וְ֝נַפְשׁ֗וֹ לֹ֣א חִיָּֽה׃	All they that be fat upon earth shall eat and worship: all they that go down to the dust shall bow before him: and none can keep alive his own soul.	ἔφαγον καὶ προσεκύνησαν πάντες οἱ πίονες τῆς γῆς, ἐνώπιον αὐτοῦ προπεσοῦνται πάντες οἱ καταβαίνοντες εἰς γῆν. καὶ ἡ ψυχή μου αὐτῷ ζῇ,
30	זֶ֥רַע יַֽעַבְדֶ֑נּוּ יְסֻפַּ֖ר לַֽאדֹנָ֣י לַדּֽוֹר׃	A seed shall serve him; it shall be accounted to the LORD for a generation.	καὶ τὸ σπέρμα μου δουλεύσει αὐτῷ· ἀναγγελήσεται τῷ Κυρίῳ γενεὰ ἡ ἐρχομένη,
31	יָ֭בֹאוּ וְיַגִּ֣ידוּ צִדְקָת֑וֹ לְעַ֥ם נ֝וֹלָ֗ד כִּ֣י עָשָֽׂה	They shall come, and shall declare his righteousness unto a people that shall be born, that he hath done this.	καὶ ἀναγγελοῦσι τὴν δικαιοσύνην αὐτοῦ λαῷ τῷ τεχθησομένῳ, ὃν ἐποίησεν ὁ Κύριος.

== Uses ==
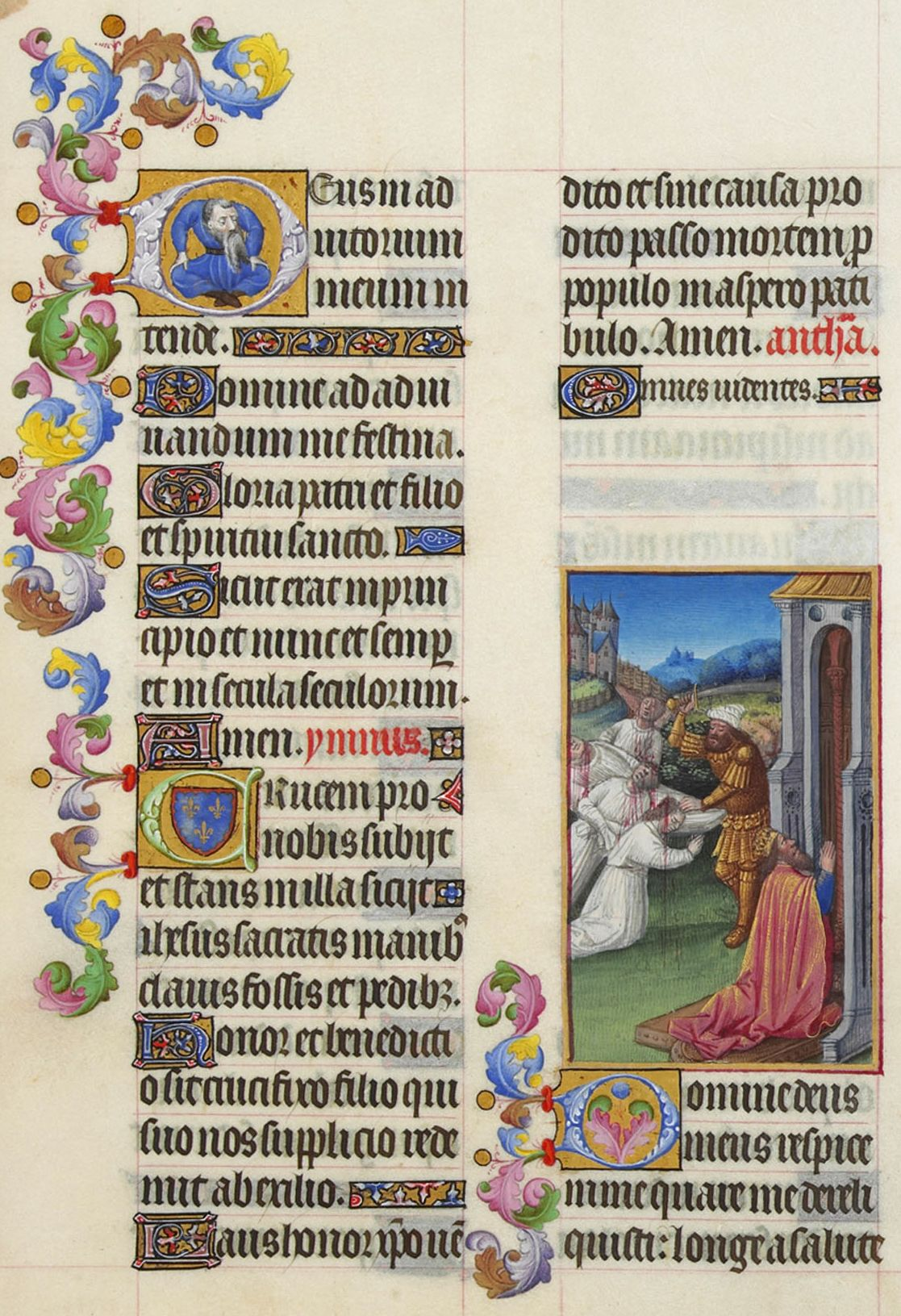
Psalm 22 in Les Très Riches Heures du duc de Berry, Folio 150r - Psalm XXI (Vulgate) the Musée Condé, Chantilly.

=== Judaism ===
Psalm 22 is traditionally recited on the Fast of Esther, on the day before Purim.

This psalm is recited during synagogue services on Purim by various groups. Sephardi and Mizrahi Jews say Psalm 22 at the beginning of the evening service on Purim night. Sephardi and Mizrahi Jews, as well as Ashkenazi Jews who follow the nusach of the Vilna Gaon, recite Psalm 22 as the Song of the Day in the Purim morning service.

Verse 4 is part of the opening paragraph of Uva letzion.

Verse 12 is recited during Selichot.

Verse 26 is found in the repetition of the Amidah in the Rosh Hashanah morning service.

Verse 29 is a part of the Song of the Sea, which is recited during Pesukei dezimra in the morning prayer. This verse is also said during Mussaf on Rosh Hashanah.

=== Christianity ===
According to the Gospel of Matthew and Gospel of Mark, Jesus cried out the opening verse of Psalm 22 from the cross (Matthew 27:46; Mark 15:34). Although Jesus said its first verse alone in his duress, it is well established that the first word or words of a Jewish text are understood as indicating its entirety, so thereby he regards the whole psalm as foreshadowing his passion and resurrection.

Christians contend that "They have pierced my hands and my feet" (Psalm 22:16), and "I can count all my bones" (Psalm 22:17) are prophecies indicating the manner of Jesus's crucifixion: that he would be nailed to a cross (John 20:25) and, per the Levitical requirement for a sacrifice, that none of his bones would be broken (Numbers 9:11–13), since Christians view Jesus as an atoning sacrifice.

Some Christian commentators, such as E. W. Bullinger's Companion Bible Notes, and H. A. Ironside, point out that the word translated 'worm' in "I am a worm and not a man" (Psalm 22:6) is tola, a Middle Eastern worm that lives in a tree and is crushed for its red dye, also translated 'crimson'. It is also the word used in (Isaiah 41:14) in the servant songs of Isaiah.

All four Gospels report the Roman soldiers casting lots for Jesus' clothes (Matthew 27:35; Mark 15:24; Luke 23:34; John 19:24). John reports the action of the soldiers in the language of the psalm, then stating that the soldiers' action occurred "that the scripture might be fulfilled," followed at once by quoting Psalm 22:18 ("They divided my garments among them, and for my clothing they cast lots."). The Gospel of Matthew in the Codex Amiatinus and other Latin manuscripts contain a clause (not found either in the Greek nor, apparently, in Jerome's original version of the Vulgate), at the end of Matthew 27:35 "ut [ad]impleretur quod dictum est per prophetam dicentem 'Miserunt sortem...'" ("so that what was said through the prophet might be fulfilled, 'They cast lots...'").

Jerome correlates Jesus' direction to the disciples, "Tell my brothers (nuntiate fratribus meis)" to meet Jesus in Galilee (Matthew 28:10) with Psalm 22:23: "I will tell forth (Adnuntiabo) your name to my brothers (fratribus meis)."

==== Catholic Church ====
In the Roman Rite, prior to the implementation of the Mass of Paul VI, this psalm was sung at the Stripping of the Altar on Maundy Thursday to signify the stripping of Christ's garments before crucifixion. The psalm was preceded and followed by the antiphon "Diviserunt sibi vestimenta mea: et super vestem meam miserunt sortem" (They divided my clothes among them and cast lots for my garment). The chanting of this psalm was suppressed in the 1970 revisions to the Mass. It is still included in many parts of the Anglican Communion.

Since the Middle Ages, this psalm was traditionally performed during the celebration of the vigils dimanche, according to the Rule of St. Benedict set to 530, as St. Benedict of Nursia simply attributed Psalms 21 (20) 109 (108) offices vigils, "all sitting with ordre".

In the pre-Tridentine Divine Office, the Psalm was said on Sundays at Prime. It was reassigned to Friday by Pope Pius V. In the current Divine Office promulgated in 1971 (Liturgy of the Hours), with the suppression of Prime, it was reassigned to the middle of the day (Terce, Sext, or None) on Friday of the third week.

==== Book of Common Prayer ====
In the Church of England's Book of Common Prayer, this psalm is appointed to be read on the evening of the fourth day of the month, as well as at Mattins on Good Friday.

==== Eastern Orthodox Church ====
In the Orthodox Church, the Psalm forms part of the Third Kathisma, which is sung every Sunday (except Pascha) at Matins and at the Third Hour on Wednesdays in Lent, except in the Fifth Week when it is sung at the First Hour. The Psalm is also sung at the Royal Hours of Good Friday.

== Musical settings ==
The psalm's own heading states that it is to be sung to the tune "Hind of Dawn", in a style apparently known to the original audience, according to the traditional interpretation. Heinrich Schütz wrote a settings of a metric paraphrase in German in two parts, "Hört zu ihr Völker in gemein", SWV 118, and "Ich will verkündgen in der Gmein", SWV 119, for the Becker Psalter, published first in 1628.

Verses 7 and 8 from this psalm (in the King James Version) are used in the text of Handel's English-language oratorio Messiah, HWV 56.

Felix Goebel-Komala (1961–2016) published a version in 1994 entitled "Psalm of Hope", using words based on John Newton's hymn Amazing Grace as a refrain.

Gilad Hochman set in 2008 verses 1-2 into a composition for vocal ensemble a cappella, entitled On the Verge of an Abyss,

== Historical-critical analysis ==
In exegetical scholarship, Psalm 22 is generally regarded as being of composite origin. It is understood to have originally consisted of the contents of verses 1-22/23, with verses 23/24-32 comprising a later addition. Further analysis also recognizes verses 4–6 as part of the later addition, and finds a third layer of editorial development in verses 28–32. The exact distinction between the two main parts of the psalm is also controversial, as verse 23 is sometimes counted as a part of the original psalm, but sometimes as part of the later addition.

The original psalm (v. 2-22/23) is thought to date from the pre-exilic period, that is, before the Babylonian destruction of Jerusalem in 587 BC. The second part, because of the significant rescue of Israel, was probably added only in the post-exilic period. The most recent portion of the composition (v. 28–32), on account of its universalist perspective, is considered to date from the Hellenistic period, likely the late 4th century BC.

== Commentary ==
The reproachful, plaintive question "why" of suffering (verse 2) in the 22nd Psalm touches the deepest sense of godforsakenness in the face of suffering and multiple persecution by enemies. Because of the vagueness of the plea being made by the first part of the psalm it has become a timeless testimony applicable to many situations of persecution. The complaints about the absence of God are punctuated by praise (v. 4), confidences (v. 5–6, 10–11) and petitions (v. 20–22) interrupted.

The second part of the psalm is the gratitude of the petitioner in the light of his salvation (v. 22) in the context of Israel (v. 26–27) and expands in worship YHWH the perspective of the peoples of the world.

== See also ==
- Ayelet HaShahar kibbutz in northern Israel, literally "hind of the dawn", which takes its name from the heading of the psalm.
- Christian messianic prophecies
- Crucifixion of Jesus
- David
- Kermes ilicis or Kermes vermilio
- My God, my God, why hast Thou forsaken me?
- Sayings of Jesus on the cross
- They have pierced my hands and my feet
- Related Bible parts: Isaiah 1, Isaiah 53, Zechariah 12, Matthew 27, Mark 15, Luke 1, Luke 23, John 19, Hebrews 2, Revelation 1

== General and cited sources ==
- Brown, Raymond E. (1994). Death of the Messiah: From Gethsemane to the Grave; A Commentary on the Passion Narratives in the Four Gospels. Anchor Bible Reference Library. Vol. 2 (2 vols ed.). Garden City, NY: Doubleday. pp. 1455–1465. ISBN 978-0385193962. OCLC 27432279.
- Menn, Esther M. (2000). "No Ordinary Lament: Relecture and Identity of the Distressed in Psalm 22". Harvard Theological Review. 93 (4): 301–341. doi:10.1017/S0017816000016370. S2CID 163861787.
- Tkacz, Catherine Brown, "Esther, Jesus, and Psalm 22", The Catholic Biblical Quarterly Vol. 70, No. 4 (October 2008), pp. 709–728.
