= Arthur Custance =

Canadian physiologist and writer

Arthur C. Custance (1910–1985) was a Canadian physiologist and writer, best known for his advocation of gap creationism.

== Early life and career ==
Custance was born in Norfolk, England. He received his early education there and moved to Canada at age 19. He attended the University of Toronto where he obtained B.A. and M.A. degrees in biblical languages. He also became a Christian during this time. Custance obtained a Ph.D. in education from the University of Ottawa, which has been incorrectly cited in creationist literature as a Ph.D. in anthropology or physiology.

Between 1957 and 1972 he wrote the ten volume "Doorway Papers" that attempt to bridge the gap between a scientific and a Christian worldview. In his scientific career, Custance "developed and designed respirator mask, mask-sizing meter, anthropometric facial contour measuring device. and the Custance Sudorimeter for accurate measurement of levels of heat stress". (see http://custance.org)

He also wrote Without Form and Void (1970), an in-depth treatment of Gap creationism. An expert on the most ancient Aramaic, Hebrew, and Greek versions of the bible, he concluded that the opening lines of the English version of Genesis should be translated as "In a former state God perfected the heavens and the earth; but the earth had become a devastated ruin."

=== Seed of the Woman ===
Writing on the virgin birth, The Seed of the Woman, Custance explains the necessity of the virgin birth for the Messiah to be sinless. Custance asserts that the sin nature or the propensity to sin (in Hebraic writings the yetzer hara) is passed through the male line genetically, starting from the first Adam, thus allowing a full human genetic complement through Mary. This understanding of male transmission of the sin nature is one alternative to two other theories that consider the virgin birth as intrinsically connected to the sinless nature of the Messiah, necessary for the atoning sacrifice. One is the Roman Catholic conception of the Immaculate Conception of Mary. Another has the virgin birth as a divine implantation in which Mary did not contribute genetically.

The viewpoint expounded by Custance is popular in Christian evangelical circles, although usually given without the type of in depth exposition supplied by Custance. Apologist Matt Slick of CARM expresses this position in Why wasn't Jesus born with original sin?. Robert L. and Charles W. Asbell studied directly with Arthur Custance and write of these ideas in Scripture Research Vol 4, No 5, 2007. Charles Spurgeon, in writing "He is born of a woman, that he might be human; but not by man, that he might not be sinful." in "A Popular Exposition to the Gospel According to Matthew" is essentially expounding a short summary of this understanding.

There are additional theories that only look at the virgin birth as historically, but not intrinsically, significant to the question of the sinless Messiah. Those theories can see the virgin birth as related to incarnational or Biblical terminology, such as the Son of God, without directly being causal to the sinless nature of the Messiah.

Lambert Dolphin summarizes the Custance view from an evangelical perspective in The Seed of the Serpent:

Some years ago, a Canadian scholar, Arthur Custance, suggested the possibility that "original sin" (which causes the death of the body, and our innate and total predisposition to sin)—is transmitted to the next generation through the male sperm, not through the female ovum ... Custance suggests that a child born to an ordinary woman, a descendant of Eve, could be a sinless child if her ovum were fertilized supernaturally. Thus he is suggesting a mechanism for the virgin birth of our Lord Jesus. Most scholars consider that the phrase the seed of the woman in Genesis 3:15 does refer to the virgin birth of Jesus as the Redeemer and Savior of our race. In fact verse 15 is often called "the protevangelium," or first announcement of the gospel.

== Works ==
- "Journey Out of Time" Doorway Papers, 1981
- Was Adam evolved or created? Does it really matter?. London: Evolution protest movement pamphlets. 1960
- Without Form and Void. Doorway Publications. 1970
- Noah's three sons: human history in three dimensions. Grand Rapids, Mich.: Zondervan Pub. House. Doorway papers Vol. 1. 1975
- Genesis and early man. Zondervan. Doorway papers. Vol. 2. 1975
- Man in Adam and in Christ. Zondervan. Doorway papers. Vol. 3. 1975
- Time and Eternity and other biblical studies. Zondervan. Doorway papers. Vol. 6. 1977
- Hidden things of God's revelation. Zondervan. Doorway papers. Vol. 7. c1978. ISBN 0310230209
- Science and faith. Zondervan. Doorway papers. Vol. 8. c1978. ISBN 0310230306
- The Flood: local or global?. Zondervan. Edinburgh; Academie Books; B. McCall Barbour. Doorway papers. Vol. 9. 1979. ISBN 0310230403
- The Sovereignty of Grace. P&R Publishing. Harmony Township, NJ. ISBN 0801024331
- Indexes of the Doorway Papers. Zondervan, Doorway papers. Vol. 10. 1980
- The seed of the woman Ontario: Doorway, 1980
- The mysterious matter of mind, with a response by Lee Edward Travis. Zondervan. Christian free university curriculum, Psychology series. c1980. ISBN 0310380111
