= They have pierced my hands and my feet =

Biblical quote from Psalm 22:16

"They have pierced my hands and my feet", or "They pierced my hands and my feet", is a phrase that occurs in some English translations of Psalm 22:16 (Psalm 21:17 in the Greek Septuagint and Latin Vulgate; Psalm 22:16 King James Version).

== Text of Psalm 22:16 (21:17) ==
This verse, which is Psalm 22:17 in the Hebrew verse numbering, reads in most versions of the Masoretic Text as: כארי ידי ורגלי, which may be read literally as "like a lion on my hands and my feet". The full verse of the Masoretic Text reads: כִּ֥י סְבָב֗וּנִי כְּלָ֫בִ֥ים עֲדַ֣ת מְ֭רֵעִים הִקִּיפ֑וּנִי כָּ֝אֲרִ֗י יָדַ֥י וְרַגְלָֽי (Kî sĕḇāḇûnî kĕlāḇîm 'ăḏaṯ mĕrē'îm hiqqîp̄ûnî kā'ărî yāḏay wĕraḡlāy). The syntactical form of this Hebrew phrase appears to be lacking a verb. In this context the phrase was commonly explained in early Rabbinical paraphrases as "they bite like a lion my hands and my feet".

The Septuagint, a translation of the Hebrew Bible into Koine Greek, made before the Christian Era, has "ὤρυξαν χεῗράς μου καὶ πόδας" ("they dug my hands and feet"), which Christian commentators argue could be understood in the general sense as "pierced". This reading was retained by Jerome in his translation from the Greek Hexapla into the Latin of his Gallican Psalter (Foderunt manus meas et pedes meos) which was incorporated into both the Vulgate and the Divine Office. While this translation is highly controversial, it is asserted in Christian apologetics that the Dead Sea Scrolls lend weight to the translation as "They have pierced my hands and my feet", by lengthening the ending yud in the Hebrew word כארי (like a lion) into a vav כארו "Kaaru", which is not a word in the Hebrew language but when the aleph is omitted becomes כרו, dig, similar to the Septuagint translation.

The oldest surviving manuscript of the psalm comes from the Dead Sea Scrolls, first discovered in 1947. Significantly, the 5/6 H. ev–Sev4Ps Fragment 11 of Psalm 22 contains the crucial word in the form of what some have suggested may be a third person plural verb, written כארו ("dug"). This may suggest that the Septuagint translation preserved the meaning of the original Hebrew. This rendering is present in a minority of manuscripts of the Masoretic text.

Aquila of Sinope, a 2nd-century CE Greek convert to Christianity and later to Judaism, undertook two translations of the Psalms from Hebrew to Greek. In the first, he renders the verse "they disfigured my hands and feet"; in the second he revised this to "they have bound my hands and feet".

The Jewish Publication Society translates the phrase as "Like a lion, they are at my hands and my feet".

== English translations ==
Many English language translations, primarily those translated by or for Christian communities, render the text as: "They have pierced my hands and my feet" although English translations are not uniform in this rendering. Modern versions which used the word pierce, piercing or pierced include: the ASV, CSB, EHV, ESV, NCB, NIV, NKJV, RSV, WEB and YLT Versions translated outside of Christian circles, such as the Jewish Publication Society and The Judaica Press, use different English renderings based on the Masoretic text rather than the Septuagint or Dead Sea Scrolls.

The development of translation choices from Old English to Modern English can be seen in the following table.

Translation	Text	Notes
Christian Translations
Vespasian (8th century)	"dulfun honda mine ⁊ foet mine"	An Old English interlinear gloss on the Vulgate.
Paris Psalter	"Hy þurhdulfon mine handa and mine fet"	Possibly Alfred's late 9th century translation from the Vulgate.
Wycliffe (1382)	"Thei delueden myn hondis and my feet"	Middle English translation of the Vulgate.
Coverdale (1535)	"They pearsed my hondes and my fete"	
KJV (1611)	"they pierced my hands and my feet."	
NIV (1978)	"they pierce my hands and my feet."	Footnoted: "Dead Sea Scrolls and some manuscripts of the Masoretic Text, Septuagint and Syriac; most manuscripts of the Masoretic Text me, / like a lion"
ESV (2001)	"they have pierced my hands and feet"	Footnoted: "Some Hebrew manuscripts, Septuagint, Vulgate, Syriac; most Hebrew manuscripts like a lion [they are at] my hands and feet"
Jewish Translations
JPS (1917)	"like a lion, they are at my hands and my feet"	
NJPS (1985)	"like lions [they maul] my hands and feet"	Footnoted: "With Rashi; cf. Isa. 38.13."

The Vespasian Psalms use "dulfun", the preterite form of the Old English strong verb "delfan" (to dig). The Paris Psalter uses "þurhdulfon", the plural preterite indicative of þurhdelfan which means too dig or delve through or to bore through or pierce.

Wycliffe's Bible of 1395 uses delueden, an alternate spelling of "delveden", the preterite form of the Middle English weak verb delven. Modern English uses the late Middle English form, "delve". The archaic meaning of "delved" is to dig or excavate, a literal translation of the Latin Vulgate term foderunt (from Jerome's Hexaplar Psalms), from fodio, I dig. Miles Coverdale in 1535, likely influenced by Luther's German translation as durchgraben (dig through, penetrate), chooses pearsed (pierced); and this has been retained in the majority of subsequent English versions.

The translation of the New International Version as "they pierce my hands and feet" is based on the evidence of the Dead Sea Scrolls.

== Explanations and interpretations ==
Rashi follows the Masoretic Text and paraphrases the phrase as "like lions (they maul) my hands and my feet." Rashi bases his translation of Psalm 22:16/17 on the other uses of the phrase (כָּ אֲרִי) ka'ari throughout the biblical text. Rashi cites Isaiah 38:13, in which translators uniformly render כָּאֲרִי as "like/as a lion".

The Masoretic Text points כָּאֲרִי as a phrase: the prefix כָּ denotes "like" or "as", and ארי "lion". A variant form of the word for lion ( אריה ) arie occurs twice in Psalm 22, in verses 13/14 and 21/22.

To explain how divergent translations from the biblical text came about, Gregory Vall, a professor at Notre Dame Seminary, speculated that the Septuagint translators were faced with כארו; i.e. as in the Masoretic text, but ending with the longer letter vav (ו) rather than the shorter yod (י), giving כארו ka'aru. This is not a word in the Hebrew language, but without the aleph it becomes כרו, "dug", "mined", or "excavated". Biblical and Hebrew scholars, such as Brent Strawn, support the Masoretic Text reading of כארי ("like a lion"), based on textual analysis (i.e. derivatives of the word "lion" appear numerous times in the psalm and are a common metaphor in the Hebrew Bible), as well as its appearance in virtually every ancient Hebrew manuscript. An exception to this is a Psalms fragment from Nahal Hever, where the word in question is written as כארו, karu, which becomes "dug" when omitting the aleph, as Vall had previously speculated. This finding is called into question by the Nahal Hever scribe's other numerous misspellings, such as one in the very same sentence, where ידיה is written instead of the correct ידי, making the Hebrew word ידי yadai "my hands" into ידיה yadeha, "her hands".

In Peter Craigie's view, "MT’s כָּאֲרִי ('like a lion') presents numerous problems and can scarcely be correct." Reading the consonantal text כארו or כרו, he says that the Septuagint "they pierced my hands and feet" (ὤρυξαν) "may perhaps presuppose a verb כרה, 'to dig,' or כור, 'to pierce, bore'." Craigie notes alternative possibilities for the verb אָרָה ("to pluck, pick clean"), or כרה, "to be shrunken, shriveled", but follows E. J. Kissane's proposal of an original text כלו, "consumed", changed to כרו (noting the occasional interchange of ל and ר), with the nuance "my hands and my feet were exhausted". Gregory Vall proposes that כארו (ka'aru) results from a meaningless סארו, which in turn results from an inadvertent metathesis of ס and א in the unattested original reading *אסרו (*’asaru), explaining why Aquila of Sinope, Symmachus, and Jerome all translated the verse's main verb as "to bind".

The translation "they have pierced" is preferred by many Christian commentators for its christological implications. For example, Craig Blomberg, commenting on the allusions to Psalm 22 in the Gospel of Matthew, includes "he is surrounded by wicked onlookers (22:16a) who pierce his hands and feet (22:16b)" among "an astonishing number of close parallels to the events of Jesus' crucifixion". However, the phrase is not quoted directly in the New Testament, despite the Septuagint Greek reading "dug" that might be thought to prefigure the piercing of Jesus' hands and feet.
