= Mythological king =

Archetype in mythology

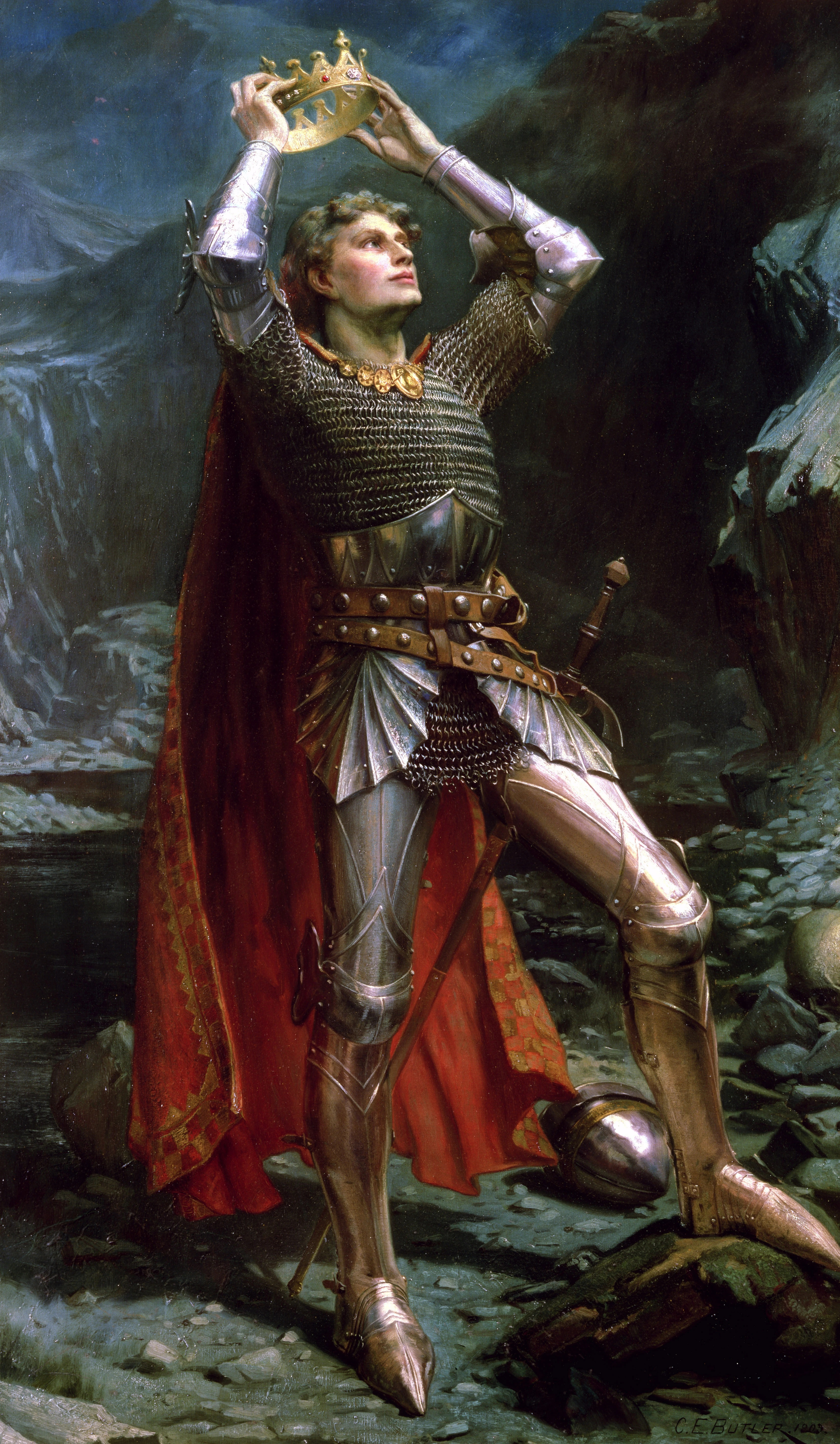
King Arthur by Charles Ernest Butler, 1903

A mythological king is an archetype in mythology. A king is considered a "mythological king" if he is included and described in the culture's mythology. Unlike a fictional king, aspects of their lives may have been real and legendary or have been believed by the culture (through legend and story telling) to be real. In the myth, the legends that surround any historical truth might have evolved into symbols of "kinship" and leadership and expanded with descriptions of spiritual, supernatural, or magical chain of events. For example, in legend the king may have magical weapons and fight dragons or other mythological beasts. His archetypical role is usually to protect and serve the people.

== Archetypes of kings ==
One mythological archetype is the "good king" (McConnel 1979), also sometimes called the "monarchical hero". The "good king" is often the epic hero who made his world safe for civilization. Two examples that scholars have identified as filling the roles and earning the reputation of "good kings" were King Arthur and Beowulf, above and beyond their legendary and historic lives.

Beowulf for example is a mythological king in training in the epic tradition, because he fights "a strenuous battle against the disorganization of the universe." (McConnel 1979:59) Another is the great king "Niall of the Nine Hostages".

== Mythemes of kings ==
Some mythemes and cultural belief systems that are explored through myths about kings are the source of the king's power, the training that he must go through, the tests of courage that he passes, the battles that he must fight, and the effects of taking power.

In epics of war, the source of power is often having physical skills above ordinary men by owning "magical" weapons and political alliances.

In spiritual mythologies, the king's power may come from a spiritual source and also spiritual weapons. In romantic and contemplative myths his power and success may from internal personality traits, such as from courage, wisdom and self-restraint.

Another common theme is the king's wounds, sacrifice, and (sometimes) death for the betterment of the people. The Fisher King is an example of theme of the "wounded king."

One other theme to be aware of in storytelling and mythology is that the king's health is often symbolic of the health of the kingdom or society. For example, a sick king means a weakened and vulnerable society, a healthy king means a healthy society, and an emotionally or physically distant king means the society is in danger. Also, the installation of kings at the New Year was believed to renew the cosmos: "The king becomes in a manner responsible for the stability, the fecundity and the prosperity of the entire Cosmos" (Eliade 1963:41).

== See also ==
- List of legendary kings of Britain
- List of legendary kings of Denmark
- List of legendary kings of Norway
- List of legendary kings of Scotland
- List of legendary kings of Sweden
- Kayanian dynasty, legendary kings from Iran
- Great King
- Sacred king
- Great Catholic Monarch
- Katechon - Eschatological King
- Golden Bough
- King in the Mountain
- King Arthur's messianic return
- Kings' sagas
- Saga
