= Christian eschatology =

Branch of study within Christian theology

Christian eschatology is a branch of study within Christian theology which deals with the doctrine of the "last things", especially the Second Coming of Jesus Christ, or Parousia. The word eschatology derives from two Greek roots meaning "last" (ἔσχατος) and "study" (-λογία), and relates to the study of "end things", whether the end of an individual life, the end of the age, the end of the world, or the nature of the Kingdom of God. Broadly speaking, Christian eschatology focuses on the ultimate destiny of individual souls and of the entire created order, based primarily upon biblical texts within the Old and New Testaments. Christian eschatology examines matters such as death and the afterlife, Heaven and Hell, the Second Coming, the resurrection of the dead, the rapture, the tribulation, millennialism, the end of the world, the Last Judgment, and the New Heaven and New Earth in the world to come.

Eschatological passages appear in multiple places in the Bible, in both the Old and New Testaments. A number of extra-biblical examples of eschatological prophecies also exist, as well as extra-biblical ecclesiastical traditions relating to the subject.

== History ==
Eschatology within early Christianity originated with the public life and preaching of Jesus. Jesus is sometimes interpreted as referring to his Second Coming in Matthew 24:27; Matthew 24:37–39; Matthew 26:64; Mark 14:62. Christian eschatology is an ancient branch of study in Christian theology, informed by Biblical texts such as the Olivet Discourse (recorded in Matthew 24–25, Mark 13, and Luke 21), The Sheep and the Goats, and other discourses of end times by Jesus, with the doctrine of the Second Coming discussed by Paul the Apostle in his epistles, both the authentic and the disputed ones. Other eschatological doctrines can be found in the Epistle of James, the First Epistle of Peter, and the First Epistle of John. According to some scholars, the Second Epistle of Peter explains that God is patient and has not yet brought about the Second Coming of Christ, in order that more people will have the chance to reject evil and find salvation (3:3–9); therefore, it calls on Christians to wait patiently for the Parousia and to study scripture. Other scholars, however, believe that the New Testament epistles are an exhortation to the early church believers to patiently expect the imminent return of Jesus, predicted by himself on several occasions in the gospels. The First Epistle of Clement, written by Pope Clement I in ca. 95, criticizes those who had doubts about the faith because the Second Coming had, in his view, not yet occurred.

Christian eschatology is also discussed by Ignatius of Antioch (c. 35–107 AD) in his epistles, then given more consideration by the Christian apologist, Justin Martyr (c. 100–165). Treatment of eschatology continued in the West in the teachings of Tertullian (c. 160–225), and was given fuller reflection and speculation soon after by Origen (c. 185–254). The word was used first by the Lutheran theologian Abraham Calovius (1612–1686) but only came into general usage in the 19th century.

The growing modern interest in eschatology is tied to developments in Anglophone Christianity. Puritans in the 18th and 19th centuries were particularly interested in a postmillennial hope which surrounded Christian conversion. This would be contrasted with the growing interest in premillennialism, advocated by dispensational figures such as J. N. Darby. Both of these strands would have significant influences on the growing interests in eschatology in Christian missions and in Christianity in West Africa and Asia. However, in the 20th century, there would be a growing number of German scholars such as Jürgen Moltmann and Wolfhart Pannenberg who would likewise be interested in eschatology.

In the 1800s, a group of Christian theologians inclusive of Ellen G. White, William Miller and Joseph Bates began to study eschatological implications revealed in the Book of Daniel and the Book of Revelation. Their interpretation of Christian eschatology resulted in the founding of the Seventh-day Adventist church.

== Christian eschatological views ==
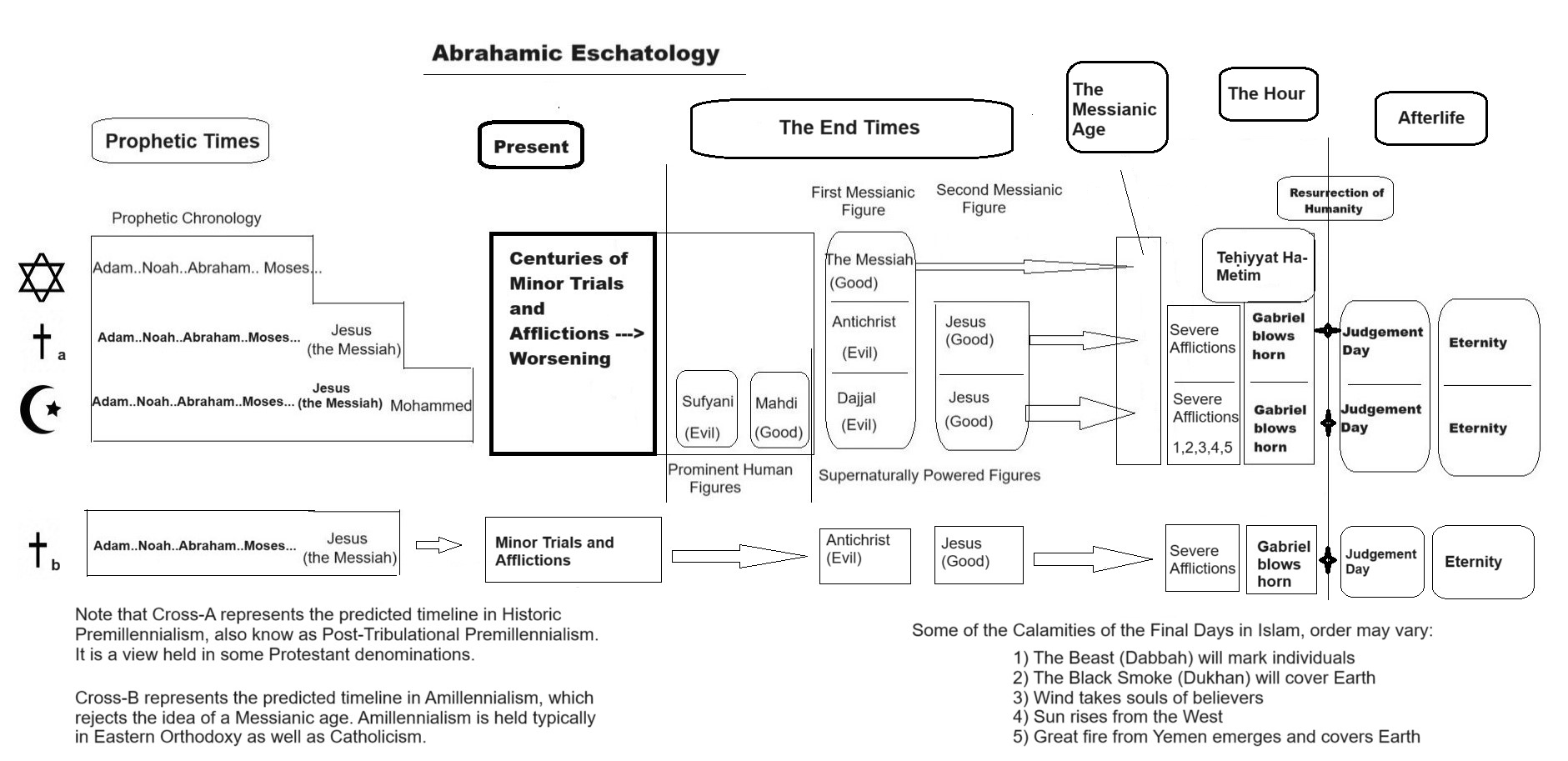
Detailed Eschatological Chart

The following approaches arose from the study of Christianity's most central eschatological document, the Book of Revelation, but the principles embodied in them can be applied to all prophecy in the Bible. They are by no means mutually exclusive and are often combined to form a more complete and coherent interpretation of prophetic passages. Most interpretations fit into one, or a combination, of these approaches. The alternate methods of prophetic interpretation, Futurism and Preterism which came from Jesuit writings, were brought about to oppose the Historicism interpretation which had been used from Biblical times that Reformers used in teaching that the Antichrist was the Papacy or the power of the Roman Catholic Church.

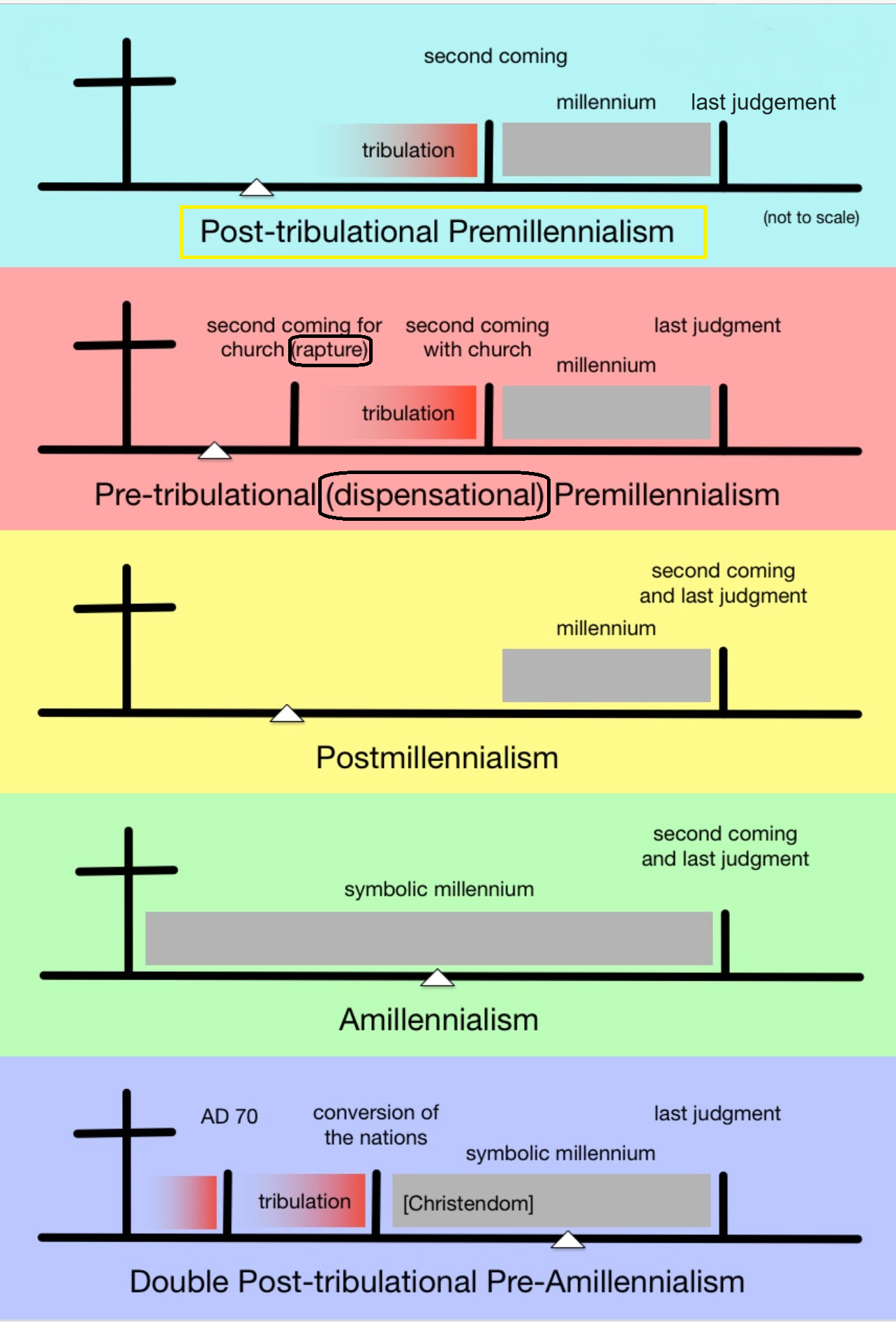
A chart showing different contesting views within Christianity for how the sequence of the end times will play out.

=== Preterism ===
Preterism is a Christian eschatological view that interprets some (partial preterism) or all (full preterism) prophecies of the Bible as events which have already happened. This school of thought interprets the Book of Daniel as referring to events that happened from the 7th century BC until the first century AD, while seeing the prophecies of Revelation as events that happened in the first century AD. Preterism holds that Ancient Israel finds its continuation or fulfillment in the Christian church at the destruction of Jerusalem in AD 70.

Historically, preterists and non-preterists have generally agreed that the Jesuit Luis de Alcasar (1554–1613) wrote the first systematic preterist exposition of prophecy, Vestigatio arcani sensus in Apocalypsi (published in 1614), during the Counter-Reformation.

=== Historicism ===
Historicism, a type of method of interpretation of biblical prophecies, associates symbols with historical persons, nations or events. It can result in a view of progressive and continuous fulfillment of prophecy covering the period from biblical times to what they view as a possible future Second Coming of Christ. Most Protestant Reformers from the Reformation into the 19th century held historicist views.

=== Futurism ===
In Futurism, parallels may be drawn with historical events, but most eschatological prophecies are chiefly referring to events which have not yet been fulfilled, but will take place at the end of the age and the end of the world. Most prophecies will be fulfilled during a time of global chaos known as the Great Tribulation and afterwards. Futurist beliefs usually have a close association with Premillennialism and Dispensationalism.

=== Idealism ===
Idealism (also called the spiritual approach, the allegorical approach, the nonliteral approach, and multiple other names) in Christian eschatology is an interpretation of the Book of Revelation that sees all of the imagery of the book as symbols.

Jacob Taubes writes that idealist eschatology came about as Renaissance thinkers began to doubt that the Kingdom of Heaven had been established on earth, or would be established, but still believed in its establishment. Rather than the Kingdom of Heaven being present in society, it is established subjectively for the individual.

F. D. Maurice interpreted the Kingdom of Heaven idealistically as a symbol representing society's general improvement, instead of a physical and political kingdom. Karl Barth interprets eschatology as representing existential truths that bring the individual hope, rather than history or future-history. Barth's ideas provided fuel for the Social Gospel philosophy in America, which saw social change not as performing "required" good works, but because the individuals involved felt that Christians could not simply ignore society's problems with future dreams.

Different authors have suggested that the Beast represents various social injustices, such as exploitation of workers, wealth, the elite, commerce, materialism, and imperialism. Various Christian anarchists, such as Jacques Ellul, have identified the State and political power as the Beast. Other scholars identify the Beast with the Roman empire of the first century AD, but recognize that the Beast may have significance beyond its identification with Rome. For example, Craig R. Koester says "the vision [of the beast] speaks to the imperial context in which Revelation was composed, but it does so with images that go beyond that context, depicting the powers at work in the world in ways that continue to engage readers of subsequent generations." And his comments on the whore of Babylon are more to the point: "The whore [of Babylon] is Rome, yet more than Rome." It "is the Roman imperial world, which in turn represents the world alienated from God." As Stephen Smalley puts it, the beast represents "the powers of evil which lie behind the kingdoms of this world, and which encourage in society, at any moment in history, compromise with the truth and opposition to the justice and mercy of God."

It is distinct from Preterism, Futurism and Historicism in that it does not see any of the prophecies (except in some cases the Second Coming, and Final Judgment) as being fulfilled in a literal, physical, earthly sense either in the past, present or future, and that to interpret the eschatological portions of the Bible in a historical or future-historical fashion is an erroneous understanding.

=== Comparison of Futurist, Preterist and Historicist beliefs ===
Eschatological Topic	Futurist belief	Preterist belief	Historicist belief
Eras of biblical prophesy	Futurists typically anticipate a future period of time when biblical prophecies will be fulfilled.	Preterists typically argue that most (Partial Preterism), or all (Full Preterism) biblical prophecies were fulfilled during the earthly ministry of Jesus and the generation immediately preceding it, concluding with the siege and destruction of the temple in Jerusalem in 70 AD.	Historicists typically understand the prophecies to be continuous from the times of the prophets to the present day and beyond.
The 144,000 (Revelation 7:1–8)	Various interpretations of a literal number of 144,000, including: 144,000 Evangelical Jews at the end of the world, or 144,000 Christians at the end of the world.	A symbolic number signifying the saved, representing completeness, perfection (The number of Israel; 12, squared and multiplied by 1,000, representing the infinite = 144,000). This symbolises God's Holy Army, redeemed, purified and complete.	A symbolic number representing the saved who are able to stand through the events of 6:17.
Locusts released from the Abyss (Revelation 9:1–11)	A demonic host released upon the earth at the end of the world.	A demonic host released upon Israel during the siege of Jerusalem 66–70 AD.	The Muslim Arab hordes that overran North Africa, the Near East, and Spain during the 6th to 8th centuries.
Large army from the Euphrates, 'myriads of myriads' (Revelation 9:13–16)	Futurists frequently translate and interpret the Greek phrase 'myriads of myriads' as meaning a 'double myriad', from which they develop the figure of 200 million. Futurists frequently assign this army of 200 million to China, which they believe will attack Israel in the future. A number of Bibles employ a Futurist interpretation of the original Greek when they adopt the figure of 200 million. Others, such as John Walvoord and Tim Lahaye, see these 200 million beings as 200 million demons who are commanded to kill 1/3 of the Earth's population.	Preterists hold to the original Greek description of a large army consisting of 'myriads of myriads', as a reference to the large pagan army, which would attack Israel during the Siege of Jerusalem from 66 to 70 AD. The source of this pagan army from beyond the Euphrates is a symbolic reference to Israel's history of being attacked and judged by pagan armies from beyond the Euphrates. Some of the Roman units employed during the siege of Jerusalem were assigned from this area.	The Muslim Arab hordes that overran North Africa, the Near East, and Spain during the 6th to 8th centuries.
The Two Witnesses (Revelation 11:1–12)	Two people who will preach in Jerusalem at the end of the world.	The two witnesses and their miracles symbolize the ministries of Moses and Elijah, who in turn symbolize 'The Law' and 'The Prophets', the Old Testament witnesses to the righteousness of God. When the armies of Rome laid siege to and destroyed Jerusalem in 70 AD, it appeared that the two witnesses had been killed.	The two witnesses (AKA "two olive trees" and "two candlesticks") are the Old and New Testaments.
1260 Days (Revelation 11:3)	A literal 1260 days (3.5 years) at the end of the world during which Jerusalem is controlled by pagan nations.	A literal 1260 days (3.5 years) which occurred 'at the end of the world' in 70 AD when the apostate worship at the temple in Jerusalem was decisively destroyed at the hands of the pagan Roman armies following a 3.5-year Roman campaign in Judea and Samaria. The two witnesses appeared to be dead for 3.5 years during the siege of Jerusalem but were miraculously resurrected as the Early Church.	Various interpretations
The Woman and the Dragon (Revelation 12:1–6)	A future conflict between the State of Israel and Satan.	Symbolic of the Old Covenant Church, the nation of Israel (Woman) giving birth to the Christ child. Satan (the Dragon) was determined to destroy the Christ child. The Woman (the early church), fled Jerusalem before its destruction in 70 AD.	The Dragon represents Satan and any earthly power he uses. The woman represents God's true church before and after Christ's birth, death, and resurrection. The Woman flees to the desert away from the dominant power of the 1260 years.
The Beast out of the Sea (Revelation 13:1–8)	The Anti-Christ, or the empire of the Anti-Christ, persecuting Christians.	The Roman Empire, persecuting the early church during the rule of Nero. The sea symbolizing the Mediterranean and the nations of the Roman Empire.	The Beast is the earthly power supported by the Dragon (Satan). It is the Papal power during the same 42 months mentioned above.
The Beast out of the Earth 'The False Prophet' (Revelation 13:11–18)	The False Prophet who assists the Anti-Christ.	The apostate rulers of the Jewish people, who joined in union with the Roman Empire to persecute the early church.	The first is the U.S. The second is a future religio-political power in which everyone is forced by the first power to receive the mark of the beast.
The number of the beast (Revelation 13:18)	The number identifying the future empire of the Anti-Christ, persecuting Christians.	In Hebrew calculations the total sum of Emperor Nero's name, 'Nero Caesar', equated to 666. The number more broadly symbolises the Roman Empire and its persecution of the early church. The number 666 also symbolises an apostate ruler as King Solomon was, who collected 666 talents of gold annually. (1Kings 10:14)	Various interpretations.
Armageddon (Revelation 16:16)	A future literal battle at Megiddo in the Jezreel Valley, Israel.	Megiddo is used as a symbol of God's complete victory over His enemies. The battle of Armageddon occurred 2000 years ago when God used the pagan armies of Rome to comprehensively destroy the apostate worship at the temple in Jerusalem. (Revelation 16:16; Judges 5:19; 2 Kings 9:27)	A symbolic name concerning the ongoing battle between Jesus and Satan.
Mystery Babylon, The Great Harlot (Revelation 17:1–5)	Futurists compose various interpretations for the identity of 'Mystery Babylon' such as the US, the Vatican, or the UN.	The corrupted city of Jerusalem, who united with pagan nations of the world in their idolatrous practices and participated in persecuting the faithful Old Covenant priests and prophets, and the early church of the New Covenant. (Matthew 23:35–37)	A virtuous woman represents God's true church. A whore represents an apostate church. Typically, Mystery Babylon is understood to be the esoteric apostasies, and Great Harlot is understood to be the popular apostasies. Both types of apostasies are already at work, ensnaring the unwary.
Seven heads and ten horns (Revelation 17:9–11)	Futurists compose various interpretations. One interpretation for the ten horns is an alliance of ten nations that work for the Anti-Christ.	As the Bible text explains, the seven heads are seven mountains. This is a direct reference to the Seven hills of Rome. It is also noted that the seven hills 'refer to seven kings'. This is a reference to the Caesars of Rome. At the time of the writing of the Revelation, five Caesars had already fallen (Julius Caesar, Augustus Caesar, Tiberius Caesar, Caligula and Claudius Caesar), 'One is' (Nero, the sixth Caesar, was on the throne as John was writing the Revelation), and the seventh 'has not yet come'. (Galba, the seventh Caesar, reigned for less than 7 months).	Various interpretations.
The Millennium (Revelation 20:1–3)	The Millennium is a literal, future 1,000-year reign of Christ following the destruction of God's enemies.	The Millennium is the current, ongoing rise of God's Kingdom. The Millennium is a symbolic time frame, not a literal time frame. Preterists believe the Millennium has been ongoing since the earthly ministry and ascension of Christ and the destruction of Jerusalem in 70 AD and is ongoing today. (Daniel 2:34–35)	The time period between Christ's Second Advent and the rapture of all the righteous, both living and formerly dead, from off earth and the third Advent which brings the New Jerusalem and the saints to the planet. While the saved are gone, the planet is inhabited only by Satan and his hosts, for all the wicked are dead.
The Rapture (Revelation 4:1)	The Rapture is a future removal of the faithful Christian church from earth.	Preterists generally recognize a future 'Second Coming' of Christ, as described in Acts 1:11 and 1 Thessalonians 4:16–17. However, they distinguish this from Revelation 4:1 which is construed by Futurists as describing a 'Rapture' event that is separate from the 'Second Coming'.	
The Great Tribulation (Revelation 4:1)	The 'Great Tribulation' is a future period of God's judgement on earth.	The 'Great Tribulation' occurred 2000 years ago when apostate Israel was judged and destroyed by God, culminating in the destruction of the Temple in Jerusalem at the hands of the pagan armies of the Roman Empire. The early Church was delivered from this period of judgment because it heeded the warning of Jesus in Matthew 24:16 to flee Jerusalem when it saw the pagan armies of Rome approaching.	
Abomination of desolation (Matthew 24:15)	The Abomination that causes desolation is a future system of idolatrous worship based at the Temple Mount in Jerusalem.	The Abomination that causes desolation was the pagan armies of Rome destroying the apostate system of worship at the Temple in Jerusalem 2000 years ago.	
Gog and Magog (Ezekiel 38)	Ezekiel 38 refers to a future invasion of Israel by Russia and its allies, resulting in a miraculous deliverance by God.	Ezekiel 38 refers to the Maccabees' miraculous defeat of the Seleucids in the 2nd century B.C. As Chilton notes, 'The word chief is, in the Hebrew, rosh, and according to this view, it does not pertain to Russia.	

=== Preterism v. Historicism ===
Expositors of the traditional Protestant interpretation of Revelation known as Historicism have often maintained that Revelation was written in AD 96 and not AD 70. Edward Bishop Elliott, in the Horae Apocalypticae (1862), argues that John wrote the book in exile on Patmos "at the close of the reign of Domitian; that is near the end of the year 95 or beginning of 96". He notes that Domitian was assassinated in September 96. Elliot begins his lengthy review of historical evidence by quoting Irenaeus, a disciple of Polycarp. Polycarp was a disciple of John the Apostle of Jesus Christ. Irenaeus mentions that the Apocalypse was seen "no very long time ago [but] almost in our own age, toward the end of the reign of Domitian".

Other historicists have seen no significance in the date that Revelation was written, and have even held to an early date while Kenneth L. Gentry Jr., makes an exegetical and historical argument for the pre-AD 70 composition of Revelation.

=== Historicism v. Futurism ===
The division between these interpretations can be somewhat blurred. Most futurists are expecting a rapture of the Church, an antichrist, a Great Tribulation and a second coming of Christ in the near future. But they also accept certain past events, such as the rebirth of the State of Israel and the reunification of Jerusalem as prerequisites to them, in a manner which the earlier historicists have done with other dates.

Futurists, who do not normally use the day-year principle, interpret the Prophecy of Seventy Weeks in Daniel 9:24 as years, just as historicists do. Most historicists have chosen timelines, from beginning to end, entirely in the past, but some, such as Adam Clarke, have timelines which also commenced with specific past events, but require a future fulfillment. In his commentary on Daniel 8:14 published in 1831, he stated that the 2,300-year period should be calculated from 334 BC, the year Alexander the Great began his conquest of the Persian Empire. His calculation resulted in the year 1966. He seems to have overlooked the fact that there is no "year zero" between BC and AD dates - that is, the year following 1 BC is 1 AD. Thus his calculations should have required an additional year, ending in 1967. He was not anticipating a literal regathering of the Jewish people prior to the second coming of Christ. But the date is of special significance to futurists since it is the year of Jerusalem's capture by Israeli forces during the Six-Day War. His commentary on Daniel 7:25 contains a 1260-year period commencing in 755 AD and ending in 2015.

== Major theological positions ==
=== Premillennialism ===
Premillennialism can be divided into two common categories: historic premillennialism and dispensational premillennialism. Historic premillennialism is usually associated with posttribulation "rapture" and does not see a strong distinction between ethnic Israel and the Church. Dispensational premillennialism can be associated with any of the three rapture views but is often associated with a pretribulation rapture. Dispensationalism also sees a stronger distinction between ethnic Israel and the Church.

Premillennialism usually posits that Christ's second coming will inaugurate a literal thousand-year earthly kingdom. Christ's return will coincide with a time of great tribulation. At this time, there will be a resurrection of the people of God who have died, and a rapture of the people of God who are still living, and they will meet Christ at his coming. A thousand years of peace will follow (the millennium), during which Christ will reign and Satan will be imprisoned in the Abyss. Those who hold to this view usually fall into one of the following three categories:

==== Pretribulation rapture ====
Pretribulationists believe that the second coming will be in two stages separated by a seven-year period of tribulation. At the beginning of the tribulation, true Christians will rise to meet the Lord in the air (the Rapture). Then follows a seven-year period of suffering in which the Antichrist will conquer the world and persecute those who refuse to worship him. At the end of this period, Christ returns to defeat the Antichrist and establish the age of peace. This position is supported by a scripture which says, "God did not appoint us to wrath, but to obtain salvation through our Lord Jesus Christ." [1 Thess 5:9]

==== Midtribulation rapture ====
Midtribulationists believe that the Rapture will take place at the halfway point of the seven-year tribulation, i.e. after 3 1/2 years. It coincides with the "abomination of desolation"—a desecration of the temple where the Antichrist puts an end to the Jewish sacrifices, sets up his own image in the temple, and demands that he be worshiped as God. This event begins the second, most intense part of the tribulation.

Some interpreters find support for the "midtrib" position by comparing a passage in Paul's epistles with the book of Revelation. Paul says, "We shall not all sleep, but we shall all be changed, in a moment, in the twinkling of an eye, at the last trumpet. For the trumpet will sound, and the dead will be raised incorruptible, and we shall be changed" (1 Cor 15:51–52). Revelation divides the great tribulation into four sets of increasingly catastrophic judgments: the Seven Seals, the Seven Trumpets, the Seven Thunders (Rev 10:1–4) and the Seven Bowls, in that order. If the "last trumpet" of Paul is equated with the last trumpet of Revelation and the revelation of the scroll of the Seven Thunders, the Rapture would be in the middle of the Tribulation. (Not all interpreters agree with this literal interpretation of the chronology of Revelation, however.)

==== Posttribulation rapture ====
Posttribulationists hold that Christ will not return until the very end of the seven-year tribulation period. Christians, rather than being raptured at the beginning of the tribulation, or halfway through, will live through it and suffer for their faith during the ascendancy of the Antichrist. Proponents of this position believe that the presence of believers during the tribulation is necessary for a final evangelistic effort during a time when external conditions will combine with the Gospel message to bring great numbers of converts into the Church in time for the beginning of the Millennium.

=== Postmillennialism ===
Postmillennialism is an interpretation of chapter 20 of the Book of Revelation which sees Christ's second coming as occurring after the "Millennium", a Messianic Age in which Christian ethics prosper. The term subsumes several similar views of the end times, and it stands in contrast to premillennialism and, to a lesser extent, amillennialism.

Postmillennialism holds that Jesus Christ establishes his kingdom on earth through his preaching and redemptive work in the first century and that he equips his church with the gospel, empowers her by the Spirit, and charges her with the Great Commission to disciple all nations. Postmillennialism expects that eventually the vast majority of people living will be saved. Increasing gospel success will gradually produce a time in history prior to Christ's return in which faith, righteousness, peace, and prosperity will prevail in the affairs of men and of nations. After an extensive era of such conditions Jesus Christ will return visibly, bodily, and gloriously, to end history with the general resurrection and the final judgment after which the eternal order follows.

Postmillennialism was a dominant theological belief among American Protestants who promoted reform movements in the 19th and 20th century such as abolitionism and the Social Gospel. Postmillennialism has become one of the key tenets of a movement known as Christian reconstructionism. It has been criticized by 20th century religious conservatives as an attempt to immanentize the eschaton.

=== Amillennialism ===
Amillennialism, in Christian eschatology, rejects the belief that Jesus will have a literal, thousand-year reign on the earth. This view regards the "thousand years" mentioned in Revelation 20 as a symbolic number, not as a literal description; amillennialists hold that the millennium is as non-utopian period which has already begun. Amillennialism holds that while Christ's reign during the millennium is spiritual in nature, at the end of the church age, Christ will return in final judgment and establish a permanent reign in the new heaven and new earth.

Proponents of amillennialism have taken issue with the term, because it emphasizes an opposition to premillenialism, rather than their own beliefs about the millennium. "Amillennial" was actually coined in a pejorative way by those who hold premillennial views. Jay E. Adams proposed realized millenialism as an alternative, while other proponents prefer nunc-millennialism (that is, now-millennialism), although these other names have achieved only limited acceptance and usage.

== Death and the afterlife ==
=== Jewish beliefs at the time of Jesus ===
There were different schools of thought on the afterlife in Judea during the first century AD. The Sadducees, who recognized only the Torah (the first five books of the Old Testament) as authoritative, did not believe in an afterlife or any resurrection of the dead. The Pharisees, who accepted the Torah as well as additional scriptures, believed in the resurrection of the dead; it is known to have been a major point of contention between the two groups. The Pharisees based their belief on Biblical passages such as Daniel 12:2 which says: "Multitudes who sleep in the dust of the earth will awake: some to everlasting life, others to shame and everlasting contempt."

=== The intermediate state ===
Some traditions (notably, the Seventh-day Adventists) teach that the soul sleeps after death and will not awaken until the resurrection of the dead. Others believe the soul goes to an intermediate place where it will live consciously until the resurrection of the dead.

By "soul", Seventh-day Adventist theologians mean the physical person (monism), and that no component of human nature survives death. Therefore, each human will be "recreated" at resurrection. One scripture frequently used to substantiate the assertion that souls experience mortality is found in Ezekiel 18:4: "Behold, all souls are Mine; The soul of the father as well as the soul of the son is Mine. The soul who sins shall die."

=== Purgatory ===
This alludes to the Catholic belief in a spiritual state known as Purgatory during which souls not condemned to Hell but not completely pure go through a final process of purification before their full acceptance into Heaven.

The Catechism of the Catholic Church says:

Each man receives his eternal retribution in his immortal soul at the very moment of his death, in a particular judgment that refers his life to Christ: either entrance into the blessedness of heaven—through a purification or immediately—or immediate and everlasting damnation. (Sect. 1022)

Eastern Orthodoxy and Protestantism do not believe in Purgatory as such, but the Orthodox Church posits a period of continued sanctification after death. While the Eastern Orthodox Church rejects the term purgatory, it acknowledges an intermediate state after death and before final judgment, and offers prayer for the dead. In general, Protestant churches reject the Catholic doctrine of purgatory (although some teach the existence of an intermediate state). The general Protestant view is that the Bible, from which Protestants exclude deuterocanonical books such as 2 Maccabees, contains no overt, explicit discussion of purgatory.

== The Great Tribulation ==
There are multiple passages in the Bible, both Old and New Testaments, which speak of a time of terrible tribulation such as has never been known, a time of natural and human-made disasters on an awesome scale. In Matthew 24:21–22 Jesus says that at the time of his coming, "There will be great tribulation, such as has not been since the beginning of the world to this time, no, nor ever will be. And unless those days were shortened, no flesh would be saved; but for the elect's sake, those days will be shortened." These events will occur unexpectedly, without warning.

=== The abomination of desolation ===
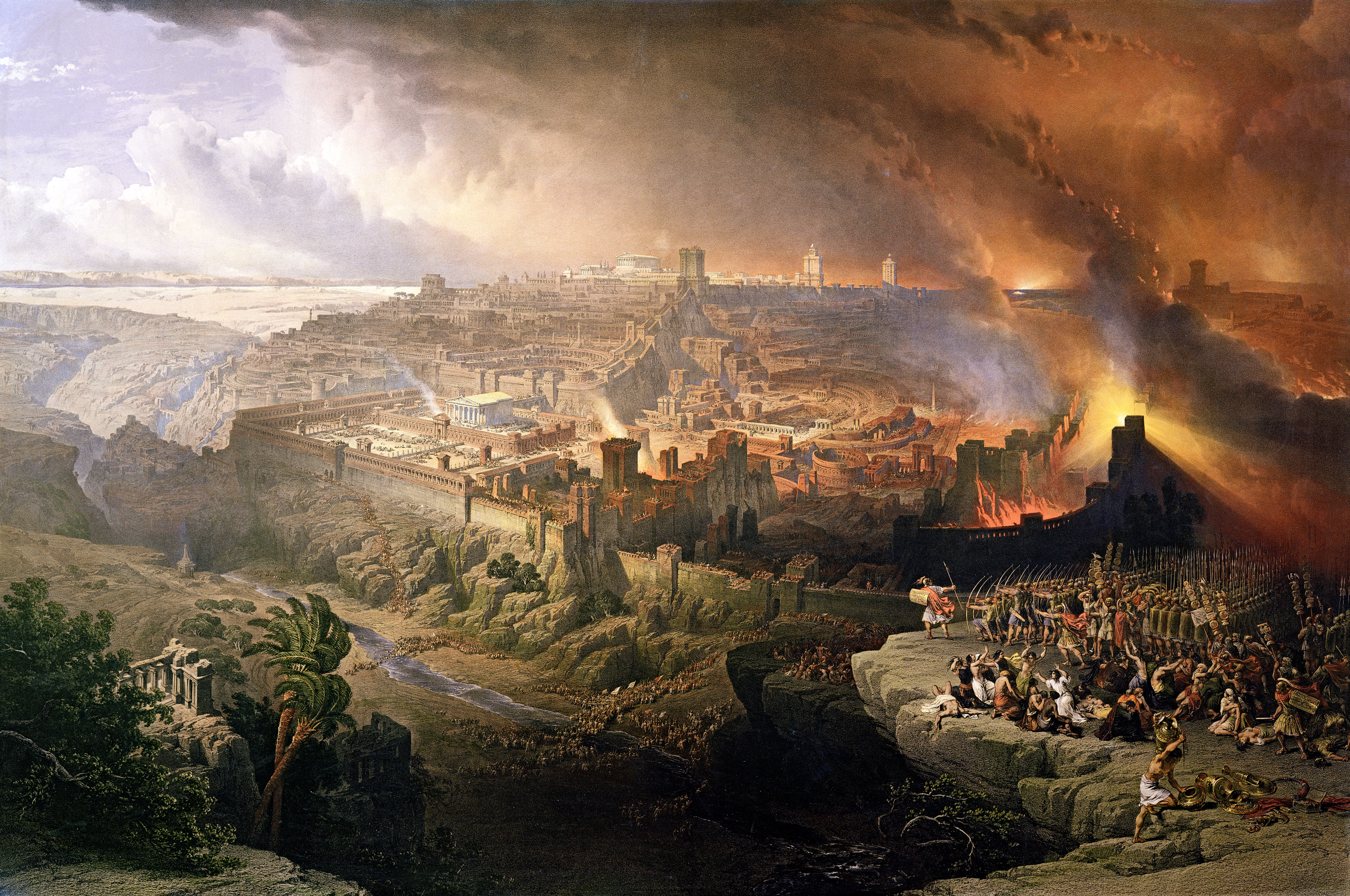
The Olivet Discourse of Matthew 24 makes references to the destruction of the Second Temple and the persecution that accompanies it.

The abomination of desolation (or desolating sacrilege) is a term found in the Hebrew Bible, in the book of Daniel. The term is used by Jesus Christ in the Olivet Discourse, according to both the Gospel of Matthew and the Gospel of Mark. In the Matthew account, Jesus is presented as quoting Daniel explicitly.

Matthew 24:15–26 (ESV) "So when you see the abomination of desolation spoken of by the prophet Daniel, standing in the holy place (let the reader understand), then let those who are in Judea flee to the mountains."

Mark 13:14 (ESV) "But when you see the abomination of desolation standing where it ought not to be (let the reader understand), then let those who are in Judea flee to the mountains."

This verse in the Olivet Discourse also occurs in the Gospel of Luke.

Luke 21:20–21 (ESV) "But when you see Jerusalem surrounded by armies, then know that its desolation has come near. Then let those who are in Judea flee to the mountains ..."

Many biblical scholars conclude that Matthew 24:15 and Mark 13:14 are prophecies after the event about the siege of Jerusalem in AD 70. (see Dating of the Gospel of Mark).

Preterist Christian commentators believe that Jesus quoted this prophecy in Mark 13:14 as referring to an event in his "1st century disciples'" immediate future, specifically the siege of Jerusalem in 70 AD.

Futurist Christians consider the "Abomination of Desolation" prophecy of Daniel mentioned by Jesus in Matthew 24:15 and Mark 13:14 as referring to an event in the end time future, after the removal of the "one who now restrains", when a 7-year peace treaty will be signed between Israel and a world ruler called "the man of lawlessness", or the "Antichrist" affirmed by the writings of the Apostle Paul in 2 Thessalonians.

Other scholars conclude that the Abomination of Desolation refers to the Crucifixion, an attempt by the emperor Hadrian to erect a statue to Jupiter in the Jewish temple, or an attempt by Caligula to have a statue depicting him as Zeus built in the temple.

=== The Prophecy of Seventy Weeks ===
Many interpreters calculate the length of the tribulation at seven years. The key to this understanding is the "seventy weeks prophecy" in which the angel Gabrel tells Daniel: "Seventy weeks are determined for your people and for your holy city." (Daniel 9:24)

After making a comparison with events in the history of Israel, some scholars have concluded that each day in the seventy weeks represents a year. The first sixty-nine weeks are interpreted as covering the period until Christ's first coming, but the last week is thought to represent the years of the tribulation which will come at the end of this age, directly preceding the millennial age of peace:

The people of the prince who is to come will destroy the city and the sanctuary. The end of it will be with a flood, and till the end of the war, desolations are determined. Then he will confirm a covenant with many for one week. But in the middle of the week, he will bring an end to sacrifice and offering. And on the wing of abominations will be one who makes desolate, even until the consummation which is determined is poured out on the desolate. (Daniel 9:26–27)

This is an obscure prophecy, but in combination with other passages, it has been interpreted to mean that the "prince who is to come" will make a seven-year covenant with Israel that will allow the rebuilding of the temple and the reinstitution of sacrifices, but "in the middle of the week", he will break the agreement and set up an idol of himself in the temple and force people to worship it—the "abomination of desolation".

Paul writes:

Let no-one deceive you by any means, for that day will not come unless the falling away comes first, and the man of sin is revealed, the son of perdition, who opposes and exalts himself above all that is called God or that is worshiped, so that he sits as God in the temple of God, showing himself that he is God. (2 Thessalonians 2:3–4)

=== Armageddon ===
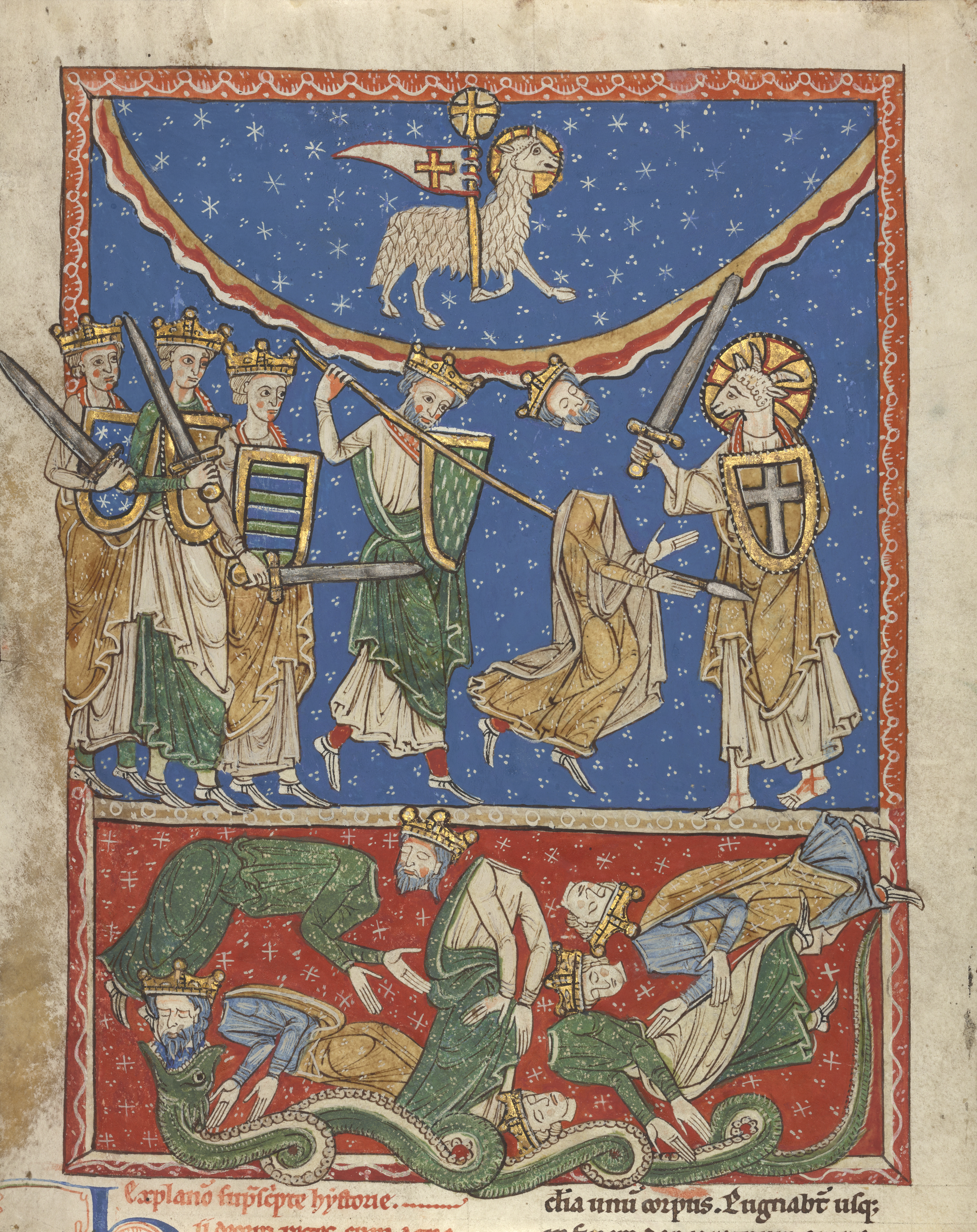
The Lamb Defeating the Ten Kings (c. 1220–1235), miniature from Beatus of Liébana's Commentary on the Apocalypse (Commentarius in Apocalypsim), J. Paul Getty Museum, Los Angeles

Revelation 16:13–16 describes frog-like evil spirits, which gather the kings of the world for a great battle at a place known in Hebrew as "Har Magedōn," which is rendered in the King James Version as "Armageddon." This name is commonly interpreted as "mountain of Megiddo," identifying Armageddon with the ancient city of Megiddo, despite the absence of mountains at that site. Charles Cutler Torrey argued that the word is derived from the Hebrew moed (מועד), meaning "assembly". Thus, "Armageddon" would mean "Mountain of Assembly," which Torrey indentified with Mount Zion.

Because of the seemingly highly symbolic and even cryptic language of this passage, some Christian scholars conclude that Mount Armageddon must be an idealized location. As William Hendriksen put it:

Hence, Har-Magedon is the symbol of every battle in which, when the need is greatest and believers are oppressed, the Lord suddenly reveals his power in the interest of his distressed people and defeats the enemy. When Sennacherib's one hundred eighty-five thousand are slain by the angel of Jehovah, that is a shadow of the final Har-Magedon. When God grants a little handful of Maccabees a glorious victory over an enemy which far outnumbers it, that is a type of Har-Magedon. When the Lord rescues little Holland from the Spanish oppressor, that is an adumbration of Har-Magedon.

But the real, the great, the final Har-Magedon coincides with the time of satan's little season. [...] When the world, under the leadership of satan, antichristian government, antichristian religion—the dragon, the beast, the false prophet—is gathered against the church for THE final battle, and the need is greatest; when God's children, oppressed on every side, cry for help; then suddenly, Christ will appear to deliver his people. That final tribulation and that appearance of Christ on clouds of glory to deliver his people, that is Har-Magedon.

== Rapture ==
The rapture is an eschatological term used by certain Christians, particularly within branches of North American evangelicalism, referring to an end time event when all Christian believers—living and dead—will rise into Heaven and join Christ. Some adherents believe this event is predicted and described in 1 Thessalonians 4:17, where Paul uses the Greek harpazo (ἁρπάζω), meaning to snatch away or seize. Though it has been used differently in the past, the term is now often used by premillennialist dispensationalists to distinguish it from the Second Coming of Jesus Christ, usually placing it before a thousand-year millennial kingdom period.

The term "rapture" is especially useful in discussing or disputing the exact timing or the scope of the event, particularly for pretribulationism, which holds that the rapture will occur before, not during, the Second Coming, with or without an extended Tribulation period. The term is most frequently used among evangelical and fundamentalist Christians in the United States. Other, older uses of "rapture" were simply as a term for any mystical union with God or for eternal life in Heaven with God.

There are differing views among Christians regarding the timing of Christ's return, such as whether it will occur in one event or two, and the meaning of the aerial gathering described in 1 Thessalonians 4. Outside of American Evangelical Protestantism, almost all Christians do not subscribe to rapture-oriented theological views. Though the term "rapture" is derived from the text of the Latin Vulgate of 1 Thess. 4:17—"we will be caught up", (Latin: rapiemur), Catholics, as well as Eastern Orthodox, Anglicans, Lutherans and most Reformed Christians do not generally use "rapture" as a specific theological term, nor do any of these bodies subscribe to the premillennialist dispensationalist theological views associated with its use, but do believe in the phenomenon—primarily in the sense of the elect gathering with Christ in Heaven after his Second Coming.

Pre-tribulation rapture theology originated in the eighteenth century, with the Puritan preachers Increase Mather and Cotton Mather, and was popularized extensively in the 1830s by John Nelson Darby and the Plymouth Brethren, and further in the United States by the wide circulation of the Scofield Reference Bible in the early 20th century. Some, including Grant Jeffrey, maintain that an earlier document called Ephraem or Pseudo-Ephraem already supported a pre-tribulation rapture.

== The Second Coming ==
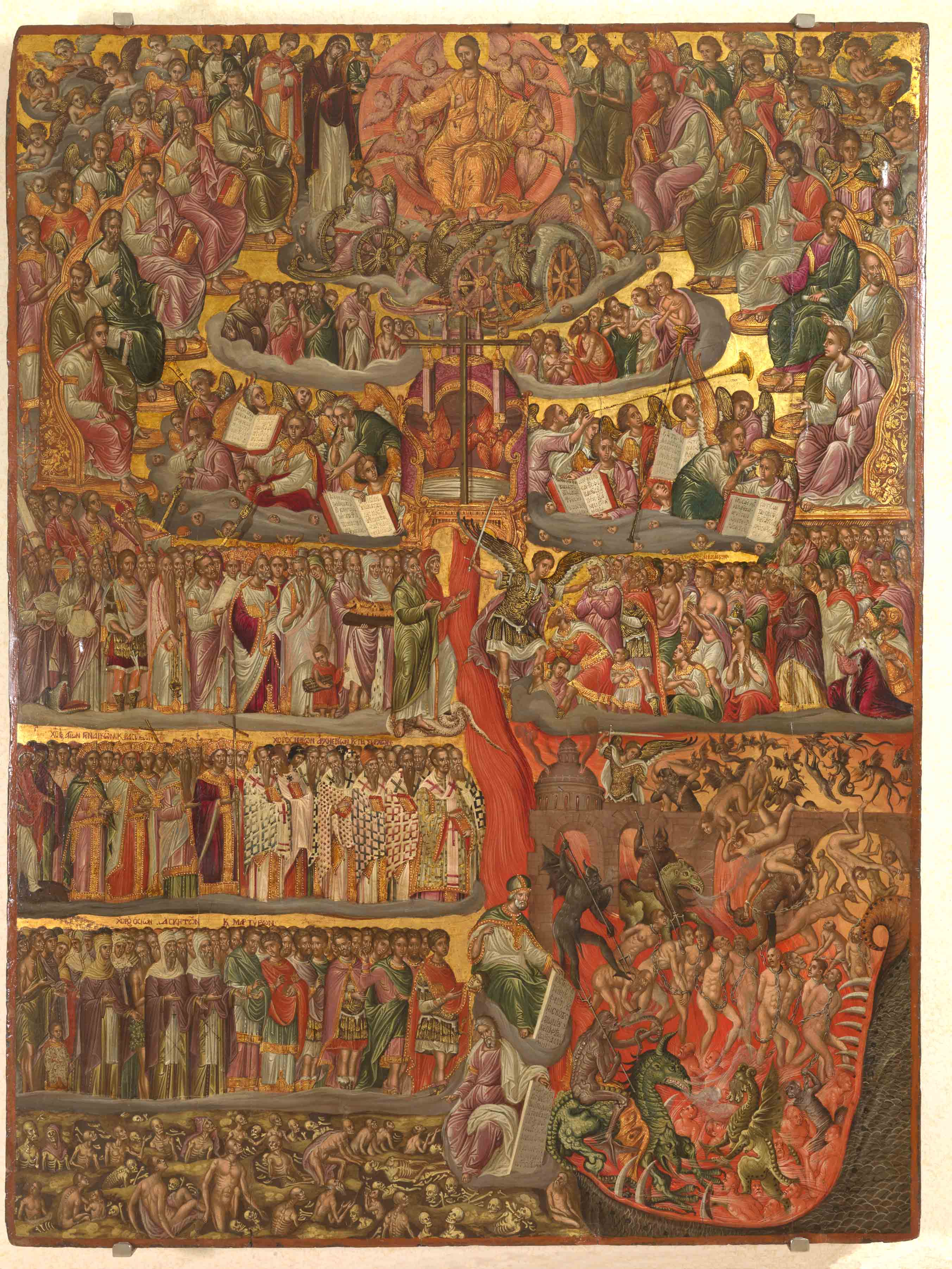
The Last Judgment, Eastern Orthodox icon on the Second Coming of Christ by Georgios Klontzas (c. 1580–1608), Hellenic Institute of Venice, Italy

Many, but not all, Christians believe:

1. The coming of Christ will be instantaneous and worldwide. (Matthew 24:27)
2. The coming of Christ will be visible to all. (Matthew 24:30)
3. The coming of Christ will be audible. (Matthew 24:31)
4. The resurrection of the righteous will occur first. (1 Thessalonians 4:16)
5. In one single event, the saved who are alive at Christ's coming will be caught up together with the resurrected to meet the Lord in the air. (1 Thessalonians 4:17)

Afterwards, the marriage of the Lamb takes place: "Let us be glad and rejoice and give him glory, for the marriage of the Lamb has come, and his wife has made herself ready. And to her was granted that she should be arrayed in fine linen, clean and bright, for the fine linen is the righteous acts of the saints" (Revelation 19:7–8). Christ is represented throughout Revelation as "the Lamb", symbolizing the giving of his life as an atoning sacrifice for the people of the world, just as lambs were sacrificed on the altar for the sins of Israel. His "wife" appears to represent the people of God, for she is dressed in the "righteous acts of the saints". As the marriage takes place, there is a great celebration in heaven which involves a "great multitude" (Revelation 19:6).

== Resurrection of the dead ==
=== Doctrine of the resurrection predates Christianity ===
The word resurrection comes from the Latin resurrectus, which is the past participle of resurgere, meaning to rise again. Although the doctrine of the resurrection comes to the forefront in the New Testament, it predates the Christian era. There is an apparent reference to the resurrection in the book of Job, where Job says, "I know that my redeemer lives, and that he will stand at the latter day upon the earth. And though... worms destroy this body, yet in my flesh I will see God" [Job 19:25–27]. Again, the prophet Daniel writes, "Many of those who sleep in the dust of the earth shall awake, some to everlasting life, some to shame and everlasting contempt" [Dan 12:2]. Isaiah says: "Your dead will live. Together with my dead body, they will arise. Awake and sing, you who dwell in dust, for your dew is like the dew of herbs, and the earth will cast out the dead" [Isa. 26:19].

This belief was still common among the Jews in New Testament times, as exemplified by the passage which relates the raising of Lazarus from the dead. When Jesus told Lazarus' sister, Martha, that Lazarus would rise again, she replied, "I know that he will rise again in the resurrection at the last day" [Jn 11:24]. Also, one of the two main branches of the Jewish religious establishment, the Pharisees, believed in and taught the future resurrection of the body [cf Acts 23:1–8].

=== Two resurrections ===
An interpretation of the New Testament is the understanding that there will be two resurrections. Revelation says: "Blessed and holy is he who has part in the first resurrection. Over such, the second death has no power, but they will be priests of God and of Christ, and will reign with him a thousand years" [Rev 20:6]. The rest of the dead "did not live again until the thousand years were finished" [Rev 20:5].

Despite this, there are various interpretations:

According to the premillennial posttribulational position there will be two physical resurrections, separated by a literal thousand years (one in the Second Coming along with the Rapture; another after a literal 1,000 year reign).
According to premillennial pre-tribulationists, there will be three further physical resurrections (one in the Rapture at the beginning of tribulation; another in the Second Coming at the final tribulation; and the last one after a literal 1,000 year reign). They claim that the first resurrection includes the resurrection in the Rapture, and that the resurrection in the Second Coming, the second resurrection, would be after the 1,000 year reign.
According to premillennial midtribulationists, too, there will be three physical resurrections (one in the rapture at the middle of tribulation; another in the Second Coming at the end of the tribulation; and the last one after a literal 1,000 year reign). And the first resurrection would be the resurrection in the Rapture, and the resurrection in the Second Coming, the second resurrection, would be after the 1,000 year reign.
According to amillennial position there will be two resurrections. The first resurrection would be in a spiritual sense (the resurrection of the soul), according to Paul and John as participation, right now, in the resurrection of Christ through faith and baptism, according to Colossians 2:12 and Colossians 3:1 as occurring within the millennium interpreted as an indefinite period between the foundation of the Church and the Second Coming of Christ, the second resurrection would be the general resurrection (the resurrection of the body) that would occur at the time of Jesus' return.

=== The resurrection body ===
The Gospel authors wrote that our resurrection bodies will be different from those we have now. Jesus said, "In the resurrection, they neither marry nor are given in marriage, but are like the angels of God in heaven" [Mt 22:30]. Paul adds, "So also is the resurrection of the dead: the body ... is sown a natural body; it is raised a spiritual body" [1 Co. 15:42–44].

According to the Catechism of the Catholic Church the body after resurrection is changed into a spiritual, imperishable body.

Both the righteous and the wicked will rise with immortal bodies. However, only the righteous will rise with four endowments: impassibility (incorruptibility), subtility (spirituality), agility (power), and clarity (glory).

In some ancient traditions, it was held that the person would be resurrected at the same spot where they died and were buried (just as in the case of Jesus' resurrection). For example, in the early medieval biography of St Columba written by Adomnan of Iona, Columba at one point prophesies to a penitent at the monastery on Iona that his resurrection would be in Ireland and not in Iona, and this penitent later died at a monastery in Ireland and was buried there.

=== Other views ===
Although Martin Luther personally believed and taught resurrection of the dead in combination with soul sleep, this is not a mainstream teaching of Lutheranism and most Lutherans traditionally believe in resurrection of the body in combination with the immortal soul.

Several churches, such as the Anabaptists and Socinians of the Reformation, then Seventh-day Adventist Church, Christadelphians, Jehovah's Witnesses, and theologians of different traditions reject the idea of the immortality of a non-physical soul as a vestige of Neoplatonism, and other pagan traditions. In this school of thought, the dead remain dead (and do not immediately progress to a Heaven, Hell, or Purgatory) until a physical resurrection of some or all of the dead occurs at the end of time. Some groups, Christadelphians in particular, consider that it is not a universal resurrection, and that at this time of resurrection that the Last Judgment will take place.

== The Millennium ==
Millennialism (from millennium, Latin for "a thousand years"), or chiliasm (from the Greek equivalent), is the belief that a Messianic Age will occur on Earth prior to the final judgment and future eternal state of the "World to Come".

Christian millennialism developed out of a Christian interpretation of Jewish apocalypticism. Christian millennialist thinking is primarily based upon Revelation 20:1–4, which foretells that Satan will be imprisoned for a thousand years, during which time martyrs will be resurrected to reign with Jesus. While there are an abundance of biblical references to such a kingdom of God throughout the Old and New Testaments, this is the only reference in the Bible to such a period lasting one thousand years.

Most mainstream Christian denominations view the millennium as a symbolic number concurrent with Christ's present reign in heaven following his ascension. The Eastern Orthodox Church, Catholic Church, Old Catholic churches, Anglican Communion, and most mainline Protestant churches are generally amillennial. Philippe Bobichon argues the literal belief in a thousand-year reign of Christ is a later development in Christianity, as it does not seem to have been present in first century texts.

== The End of the World and the Last Judgment ==
=== Satan released ===
According to the Bible, the Millennial age of peace all but closes the history of planet Earth. However, the story is not yet finished: "When the thousand years have expired, Satan will be released from his prison and will go out to deceive the nations which are in the four corners of the earth, Gog and Magog, to gather them together to battle, whose number is as the sand of the sea." [Rev 20:7–8]

There is continuing discussion over the identity of Gog and Magog. In the context of the passage, they seem to equate to something like "east and west". There is a passage in Ezekiel, however, where God says to the prophet, "Set your face against Gog, of the land of Magog, the prince of Rosh, Meshech, and Tubal, and prophesy against him." [Ezek 38:2] Gog, in this instance, is the name of a person of the land of Magog, who is ruler ("prince") over the regions of Rosh, Meshech, and Tubal. Ezekiel says of him: "You will ascend, coming like a storm, covering the land like a cloud, you and all your troops and many peoples with you..." [Ezek 38:2]

Despite this huge show of force, the battle will be short-lived, for Ezekiel, Daniel, and Revelation all say that this last desperate attempt to destroy the people and the city of God will end in disaster: "I will bring him to judgment with pestilence and bloodshed. I will rain down on him and on his troops, and on the many peoples who are with him: flooding rain, great hailstones, fire and brimstone." [Ezek 38:22] Revelation concurs: "Fire came down from God out of heaven and devoured them." [Rev 20:9]

=== The Last Judgment ===
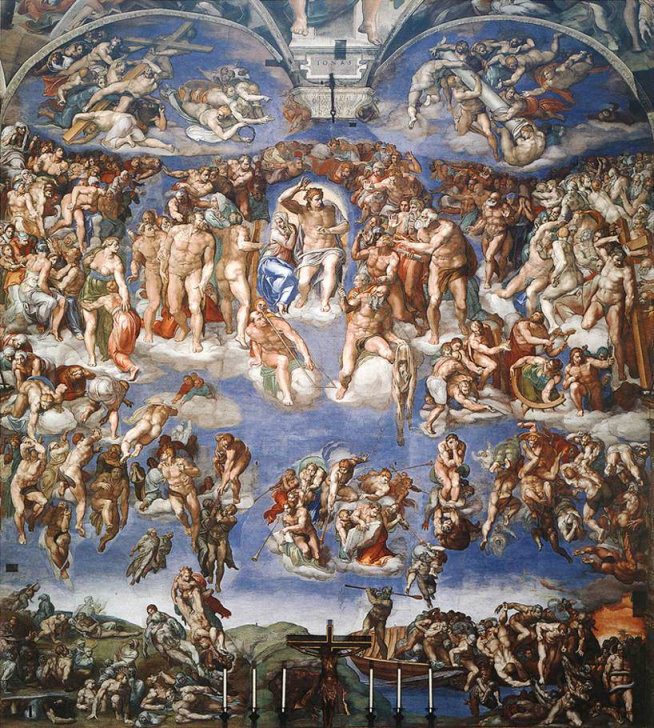
The Last Judgment, Sistine Chapel by Michelangelo (1536–1541)

Following the defeat of Gog, the last judgment begins: "The devil, who deceived them, was cast into the lake of fire and brimstone where the beast and the false prophet are, and they will be tormented day and night forever and ever" [Rev 20:10]. Satan will join the Antichrist and the False Prophet, who were condemned to the lake of fire at the beginning of the Millennium.

Following Satan's consignment to the lake of fire, his followers come up for judgment. This is the "second resurrection", and all those who were not a part of the first resurrection at the coming of Christ now rise up for judgment:

I saw a great white throne and him who sat on it, from whose face the earth and the heaven fled away, and there was found no place for them. And the sea gave up the dead who were in it, and Death and Hades delivered up the dead who were in them. And they were judged, each one according to his works. And Death and Hades were cast into the lake of fire. This is the second death. And anyone not found written in the Book of Life was cast into the lake of fire. [Rev 20:11–15]

John had earlier written, "Blessed and holy is he who has part in the first resurrection. Over such the second death has no power" [Rev 20:6]. Those who are included in the Resurrection and the Rapture are excluded from the final judgment, and are not subject to the second death. Due to the description of the seat upon which the Lord sits, this final judgment is often referred to as the Great White Throne Judgment.

The text goes on to proclaim that the question, if the corporal works of mercy were practiced or not during lifetime, will be a decisive factor in the Last Judgement. They rate as important acts of charity. Therefore, according to the biblical sources (Matt 5:31–46), the conjunction of the Last Judgement and the works of mercy is frequent in the pictorial tradition of Christian art.

== New Heaven and New Earth ==
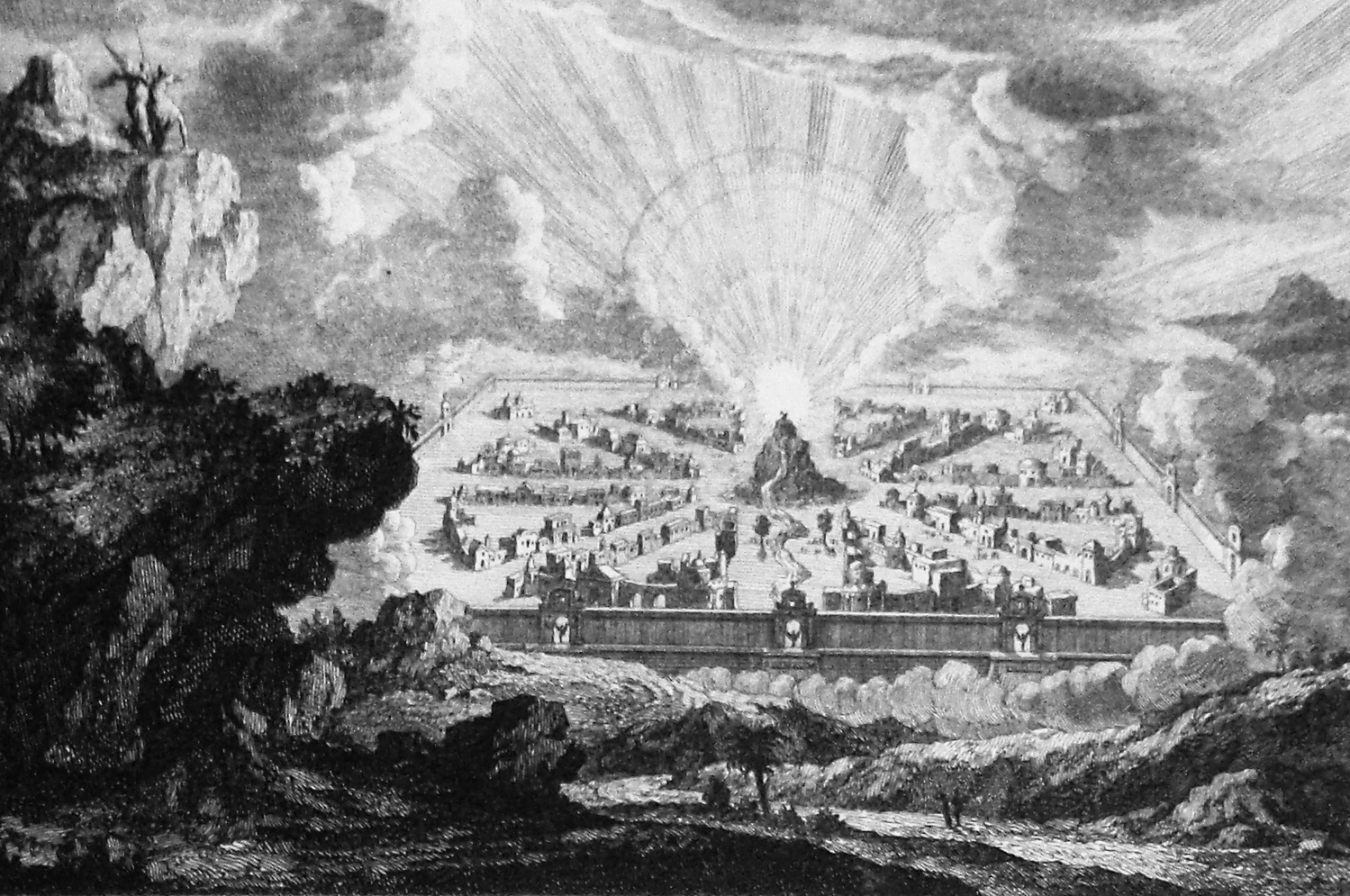
New Jerusalem

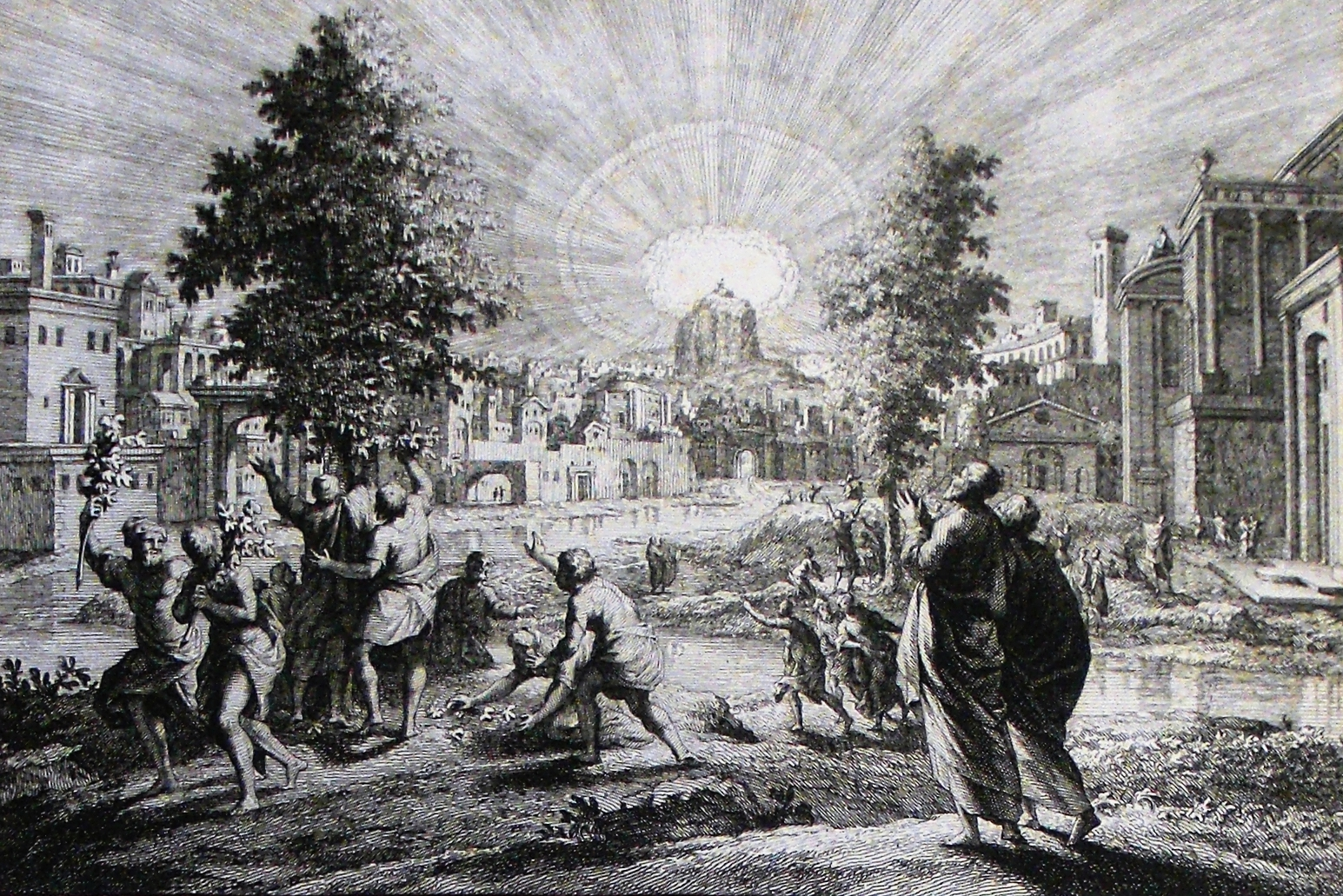
The tree of life in New Jerusalem

Revelation 21:2–4 describes the emergence from heaven of a holy city, New Jerusalem, where God will dwell with humanity without death or pain, or sorrow. The tree of life stands in the city, available to all people. Genesis 3:17 says that the earth was cursed because Adam ate from the tree, but Revelation 22:3 assures the reader that "there will be no more curse."

D. A. Carson says:

The rich symbolism reaches beyond our finest imaginings, not only to the beatific vision but to a renewed, joyous, industrious, orderly, holy, loving, eternal, and abundant existence. Perhaps the most moving element in the description is what is missing: there is no temple in the New Jerusalem, 'because the Lord God Almighty and the Lamb are its temple.' Vastly outstripping the expectations of Judaism, this stated omission signals the ultimate reconciliation.

== See also ==
- 1 Maccabees
- 2,300-day prophecy
- Christian views on Hades
- Consistent eschatology
- Daniel Chapter 11
- Daniel's final vision
- The Day of the Lord
- Four Horsemen of the Apocalypse
- Four kingdoms of Daniel
- Inaugurated eschatology
- Katechon
- Last Roman Emperor
- List of dates predicted for apocalyptic events
- Messianism
- Millenarianism
- Progressive dispensationalism
- Realized eschatology
- Third Temple
- Unfulfilled Christian religious predictions
- Ussher chronology
