= Fairy King =

Fairy King or king of the fairies may refer to:

- Oberon
- the Erlking (German Erlkönig, Danish elverkonge "elf-king")
- Fairy King (horse)

== See also ==
- Fairies
- Mythological king
