= Man of sin =

Figure referred to in the Christian Bible

The man of sin (Greek: ὁ ἄνθρωπος τῆς ἁμαρτίας, ho anthrōpos tēs hamartias) or man of lawlessness (ἀνομίας, anomias), man of rebellion, man of insurrection, or man of apostasy is a figure referred to in the Christian Bible in the Second Epistle to the Thessalonians. He is usually equated with the Antichrist in Christian eschatology.

== Biblical narrative ==
In 2 Thessalonians 2:3–10, the "man of sin" is described as one who will be revealed before the Day of the Lord comes. The author, claiming to be Paul, is concerned that his audience has begun to behave as if the Day of the Lord has already happened, and he cautions them that it will not happen until the "man of lawlessness" or son of perdition is revealed, which will not happen until some restraining force or person (the Katechon) is first removed.

Codex Sinaiticus and Codex Vaticanus have the reading "man of lawlessness" instead of "man of sin." Bruce M. Metzger argues that this is the original reading even though 94% of manuscripts have "man of sin"; (Note: The Textus Receptus and texts edited by Scrivener and Tregelles have the reading ἁμαρτίας (sin); Westcott-Hort and the SBL Greek New Testament have ἀνομίας (lawlessness).) The New American Standard Bible and New International Version (NIV) use "man of lawlessness," and the New Revised Standard Version uses "lawless one."

3 Don't let anyone deceive you in any way, for that day will not come until the rebellion occurs and the man of lawlessness is revealed, the man doomed to destruction. 4 He will oppose and will exalt himself over everything that is called God or is worshiped, so that he sets himself up in God's temple, proclaiming himself to be God. 5 Don't you remember that when I was with you I used to tell you these things? 6 And now you know what is holding him back, so that he may be revealed at the proper time. 7 For the secret power of lawlessness is already at work; but the one who now holds it back will continue to do so till he is taken out of the way. 8 And then the lawless one will be revealed, whom the Lord Jesus will overthrow with the breath of his mouth and destroy by the splendor of his coming. 9 The coming of the lawless one will be in accordance with how Satan works. He will use all sorts of displays of power through signs and wonders that serve the lie, 10 and all the ways that wickedness deceives those who are perishing. They perish because they refused to love the truth and so be saved.

== Identity ==
Nearly all commentators, both ancient and modern, identify the man of sin in 2 Thessalonians chapter 2 as the Antichrist, even though they vary greatly in who they view the Antichrist to be. The man of sin is variously identified with Caligula, Nero, the papacy and the end times Antichrist. Some scholars believe that the passage contains no genuine prediction, but represents a speculation of the apostle's own, based on Daniel 8:23ff; 11:36ff, and on contemporary ideas of Antichrist.

== Views ==
=== Catholic church and Orthodox churches ===
The Catholic and Eastern Orthodox traditions consider the Man of Sin to come at the End of the World, when the katechon, the one who restrains, will be taken out. Katechon is also interpreted as the Grand Monarch or a new Orthodox Emperor, inaugurating a rebirth of the Holy Roman Empire.

=== Other views ===
Various Protestant and anti-Catholic commentators have linked the term and identity to the Catholic Church and the Pope. The "temple of God" is here understood to be the church; the restraining power the Roman empire.

=== Dispensationalist or Futurist view ===
Dispensationalists view this as a reference to a coming world ruler (Antichrist) who will succeed in making a peace treaty with Israel for 7 years (Daniel's 70th week) guaranteeing some sort of Middle East peace settlement with the Arab nations. This will occur after the rebuilding of the Third Temple in Jerusalem and the restoration of temple sacrifices. He will break his peace treaty with Israel 3 1/2 years into the plan, enter the "rebuilt Third Temple" and perform the abomination of desolation by setting up an idol of himself in the Temple and declare himself God.

== See also ==
- 2 Thessalonians 2
- Abrogation of Old Covenant laws
- Antichrist
- Dajjal
