= Textual variants in the Second Epistle to the Thessalonians =

Textual variants in the Second Epistle to the Thessalonians are the subject of the study called textual criticism of the New Testament. Textual variants in manuscripts arise when a copyist makes deliberate or inadvertent alterations to a text that is being reproduced. An abbreviated list of textual variants in this particular book is given in this article below.

Most of the variations are not significant and some common alterations include the deletion, rearrangement, repetition, or replacement of one or more words when the copyist's eye returns to a similar word in the wrong location of the original text. If their eye skips to an earlier word, they may create a repetition (error of dittography). If their eye skips to a later word, they may create an omission. They may resort to performing a rearranging of words to retain the overall meaning without compromising the context. In other instances, the copyist may add text from memory from a similar or parallel text in another location. Otherwise, they may also replace some text of the original with an alternative reading. Spellings occasionally change. Synonyms may be substituted. A pronoun may be changed into a proper noun (such as "he said" becoming "Jesus said"). John Mill's 1707 Greek New Testament was estimated to contain some 30,000 variants in its accompanying textual apparatus which was based on "nearly 100 [Greek] manuscripts." Peter J. Gurry puts the number of non-spelling variants among New Testament manuscripts around 500,000, though he acknowledges his estimate is higher than all previous ones.

== Legend ==
A guide to the sigla (symbols and abbreviations) most frequently used in the body of this article.

General sigla
# beginning with 0: uncial
# not beginning with 0: minuscule
^{*} superscript: original reading
^{c} superscript: scribal correction
^{ms} superscript: individual manuscript
^{mss} superscript: multiple manuscripts
^{pt} superscript: partial attestation
^{vid} superscript: uncertain reading
arab: Arabic versions
arm: Armenian versions
𝔐 or Byz: Byzantine text-type
cop: Coptic versions

sa: Sahidic version
bo: Boharic version

eth: Ethiopic versions
ƒ: Greek manuscripts family
geo: Georgian versions
goth: Gothic versions
it: Italic/Vetus Latina
lat: most Italic and Vulgate
latt: all Italic and Vulgate
𝔓: papyrus
𝑙: individually numbered lectionary
Lect: most or all numbered lectionaries
parenthesized (): approximate reading
rell: all other extant manuscripts
slav: Slavic versions
syr: Syriac versions
vg: Latin Vulgate
ς: Textus Receptus

Uncial sigla
א: Codex Sinaiticus (01)
A: Codex Alexandrinus (02)
B: Codex Vaticanus (03)
C: Codex Ephraemi Rescriptus (04)
D^{ea}: Codex Bezae (05)
D^{p}: Codex Claromontanus (06)
K^{e}: Codex Cyprius (017)
K^{ap}: Codex Mosquensis I (018)
L^{e}: Codex Regius (New Testament) (019)
L^{ap}: Codex Angelicus (020)
P^{apr}: Codex Porphyrianus (025)
S: Codex Vaticanus 354 (028)
V: Codex Mosquensis II (031)
W: Codex Washingtonianus (032)
Z: Codex Dublinensis (035)
Γ: Codex Tischendorfianus IV (036)
Δ: Codex Sangallensis 48 (037)
Θ: Codex Koridethi (038)
Ξ: Codex Zacynthius (040)
Π: Codex Petropolitanus (New Testament) (041)
Φ: Codex Beratinus (043)
Ψ: Codex Athous Lavrensis (044)
Ω: Codex Athous Dionysiou (045)
ff^{1}: Codex Corbeiensis I
ff^{2}: Codex Corbeiensis II
g^{1}: Codex Sangermanensis I
k: Codex Bobiensis

Critical editions
T8th: Tischendorf's 8th Edition of Editio Octava Critica Maior
WH: Westcott and Hort (1881)
NA: Novum Testamentum Graece (Nestle–Aland)
UBS: United Bible Societies
ECM: Editio Critica Maior

== Textual variants ==
Textual variants in the Second Epistle to the Thessalonians

1 Textual variants in 2 Thessalonians 1

2 Thessalonians 1:12

Ιησου (Jesus) – א B D K L Ψ 0111 6 323 630 1175 1241 2464 Byz^{pt} it^{b} cop^{sa,bo^{pt}}
Ιησου Χριστου (Jesus Christ) – A F G P 0278 33 81 104 365 1505 1739 1881 Byz^{pt} lat syr cop^{bo^{pt}}

5 Textual variants in 2 Thessalonians 2

2 Thessalonians 2:2

Χριστου (Christ) – D^{2} Byz
κυριου (Lord) – rell

2 Thessalonians 2:3

ανομιας (lawlessness) – א B 0278 6 81 88^{mg} 104 326 365 436 1739 1881 2127 2464 ℓ^{1365} it^{m} co
αμαρτιας (sinfulness) – A D G K L P Ψ 88* 181 330 451 614 629 630 1241 1877 1962 1984 1985 2492 2495 Byz Lect lat syr Irenaeus^{lat} Eusebius

2 Thessalonians 2:8

ο κυριος (the LORD) – B D^{2} 1739 1881 Byz Irenaeus
ο κυριος Ιησους (the Lord Jesus) – א A D* F G P Ψ 0278 33 81 104 365 1241 2464 latt syr cop Irenaeus^{lat} Origen Didymus

2 Thessalonians 2:13

θεου (God) – D* lat
κυριου (Lord) – rell

2 Thessalonians 2:13

απαρχην (first-fruits) – B F G P 0278 33 81 323 326 365 1505 1739 1881 2464 vg syr^{h} cop^{bo}
απ' αρχης (from the beginning) – א D Ψ Byz it syr^{p} cop^{sa}

2 Textual variants in 2 Thessalonians 3

2 Thessalonians 3:3

ο κυριος (the LORD) – א B D^{2} Ψ 0278 33 1739 1881 Byz vg^{mss} syr cop
ο θεος (God) – A D* F G 2464 it vg^{cl}

2 Thessalonians 3:16

τροπω – א A^{c} B D K P Ψ 81 88 104
τοπω – A* D* F G 33 76

== See also ==
- Alexandrian text-type
- Biblical inerrancy
- Byzantine text-type
- Caesarean text-type
- Categories of New Testament manuscripts
- Comparison of codices Sinaiticus and Vaticanus
- List of New Testament verses not included in modern English translations
- Textual variants in the New Testament
- Western text-type
