= Epistle to the Thessalonians =

There are two Epistles to the Thessalonians in the New Testament:

- First Epistle to the Thessalonians
- Second Epistle to the Thessalonians
