= Great king =

Semantic title used by certain historical monarchs

Great king, and the equivalent in many languages, refers to historical titles of certain monarchs, suggesting an elevated status among the host of kings and princes.

== History ==
The title is most usually associated with the shahanshah (shah of shahs, i.e., King of Kings, indeed translated to the Greek as basileus tōn basileōn, later adopted by the Byzantine emperors) of Persia under the Achaemenid dynasty whose vast empire in Asia lasted for 200 years up to the year 330 BC, which was later adopted by successors of the Achaemenid Empire whose monarchial names were also succeeded by "the great." In comparison, "high king" was used by ancient rulers in the British Isles (Great Britain and Ireland) and Greece.

In the 2nd millennium BC Near East, there was a tradition of reciprocally using such addresses between powers to recognize each other as equal diplomatically. Only the kings of countries who were not subject to any other king and were powerful enough to draw the respect of their adversaries were allowed to use the title of "great king." Those were the kings of Egypt, Yamhad, Hatti, Babylonia, Mitanni (until its demise in the 14th century), Assyria (only after the demise of Mitanni), and for a brief time, the Myceneans. Great kings referred to each other as brothers and often established close relationships through marriages and frequent gift exchanges. Letters exchanged between these rulers, several of which have been recovered, especially in Amarna and Hittite archives, provide details of this diplomacy.

The case of the maharaja ("great raja," the great king and prince, in Sanskrit and Hindi) on the Indian subcontinent, initially reserved for the regional hegemon such as the Gupta, is an example of how such a lofty style can get caught in a cycle of devaluation by "title inflation" as ever more, mostly less powerful rulers adopt the style. This is often followed by the emergence of one or more new, more exclusive and prestigious styles, as, in this case, maharajadhiraja (king of great kings"). The Turkic-Mongol title khan also came to be "augmented" to tiles like khagan, chagan or hakan, meaning "khan of khans," i.e., equivalent to the king of kings.

The aforementioned Indian style maharajadhiraja is also an example of an alternative semantic title for similar "higher" royal styles such as King of Kings. Alternatively, a more idiomatic style may develop into an equally prestigious tradition of titles because of the shining example of the original. Thus, various styles of emperors trace back to the Roman imperator (strictly speaking a republican military honorific) or the family surname Caesar (turned into an imperial title since Diocletian's tetrarchy).

As the conventional use of the king and its equivalents to render various other monarchical styles illustrates, there are many roughly equivalent styles, each of which may spawn a "great X" variant, either unique or becoming a rank in a corresponding tradition; in this context, "grand" is equivalent to "great" and sometimes interchangeable if the convention does not firmly prescribe one of the two. Examples include the Grand Duke and German Grosswojwod.

== Examples ==
- Antiochus III the Great, a Hellenistic Greek king and the sixth ruler of the Seleucid Empire, was known as Basileus Megas.
- Eucratides I the Great, a Hellenistic king of Bactria, was called Basileus Megas on his coins.
- Mithridates I the Great, a Parthian king, was called Basileus Megas on his silver coins.
- Menander I Soter, a Hellenistic king of India, was referred to as Maharaja Menadra, ("Great King Menander") in Pali language.
- In medieval Serbia, Stefan the First-Crowned, likely Stefan Uroš I, Stefan Dečanski and Stefan Dušan had the title of "great king" (Велики краљ, Veliki kralj)
- Alexander the Great of Macedonia
- Ramses II of Egypt
- Frederick II, Holy Roman Emperor
- Edward I of England
- Catherine the Great and Peter the Great of Russia

== See also ==
- Chinese emperor
- Great Catholic Monarch
- Katechon
- Shahryar
- Overking
- Roman emperor
