= Uncial 0278 =

- New Testament manuscript
- Text: Pauline epistles
- Date: 9th century
- Script: Greek
- Now at: Saint Catherine's Monastery
- Size: 24.2 x 18.2 cm
- Type: ?
- Category: ?

Uncial 0278 (in the Gregory-Aland numbering), is a Greek uncial manuscript of the New Testament. Paleographically it has been assigned to the 9th century.

== Description ==
The codex contains the text of the Pauline epistles with numerous lacunae, on 120 parchment leaves (24.2 cm by 18.2 cm). It contains Romans 1:5-9, 24-30; 1 Corinthians 7:37-8:6; 2 Cor 13:3-12; Galatians 1:1 -2:16, 6:11-18; Ephesians 1:1-8, 16 - 2:5; 4:30 - Phil 3:4; Colossians 1:23 - 2 Thess. 3:18; Titus 2:11-3:2, 3:8 - Hebrews 10:12. It is a Greek-Arabic diglot, with the Greek text in the first of two columns per page, 20-22 lines per page, in uncial letters. It is a palimpsest, the lower text containing theological writings.

Currently it is dated by the INTF to the 9th century.

== Location ==
It is one of the manuscripts discovered in Saint Catherine's Monastery, Sinai in May 1975, during restoration work. Currently the codex is housed at the monastery (N.E. ΜΓ 2).

== See also ==
- List of New Testament uncials
- Biblical manuscript
- Textual criticism
