= Last Roman Emperor =

Figure of medieval European legend

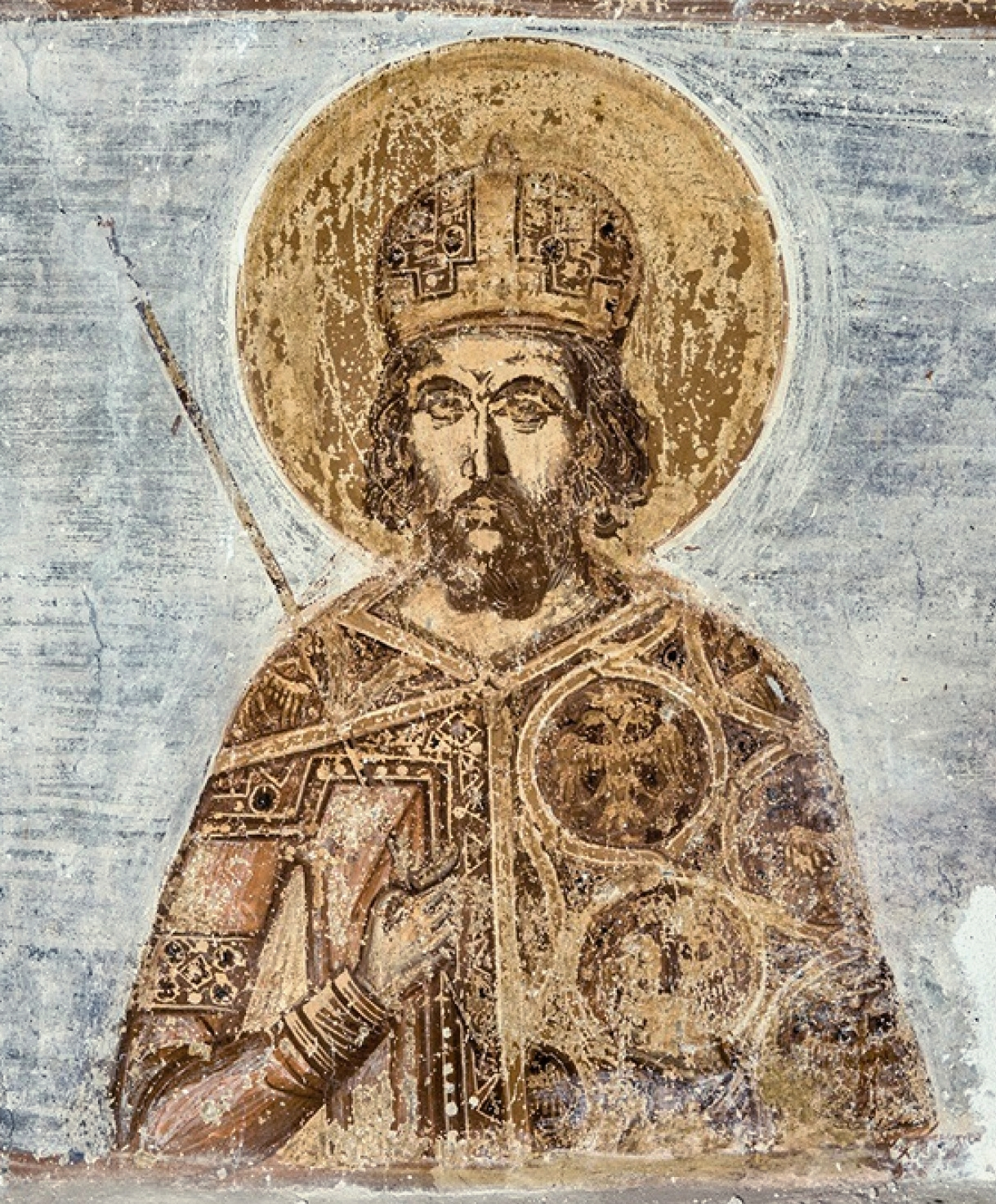
Constantine XI Palaiologos, who historically became the last Roman emperor

The Last Roman Emperor, also known as Last World Emperor or Emperor of the Last Days, is a figure of medieval legend which developed from Christian eschatology. The legend predicts that in the end times, a last Roman or Christian emperor would appear on planet Earth to defeat the enemies of Christianity and break the katechon, the biblical force that stalls the coming of the Antichrist, by surrendering his crown and dissolving the Roman Empire. The legend first appears in the 7th-century apocalyptic text known as the Apocalypse of Pseudo-Methodius; that and the Tiburtine Sibyl are its two most important sources. It developed over the centuries, becoming particularly prominent in the 15th century. The notion of Great Catholic Monarch is also related to it.

== Foundations ==
The legend is based on the Apocalypse of Pseudo-Methodius, which was, after the Book of Daniel and the Book of Revelation, "the most widespread apocalypse story in Europe". The work, originally written in Syriac in the late seventh century, proposes a Last Emperor who will fight against Christianity's enemies, most notably the "sons of Ishmael," the Arab rulers of the Middle East after the Early Muslim conquests: "He will go out against them from the Sea of the Kushites, and he will cast the sword and desolation upon the desert of Yathrib, amidst the abodes of their ancestors." After conquering his enemies he would travel to Jerusalem and relinquish his power on Golgotha. The Last Emperor was further developed in the Latin writings of Adso of Montier-en-Der, whose Libellus de Antichristo (ca. 954) was a popular biography of the Antichrist, whose coming was preceded by the rise of a Frankish ruler (the continuation of the Roman Empire); this Last Emperor would voluntarily give up his power on the Mount of Olives, after which the Antichrist comes to power. Another important impetus came from the oracles of the Tiburtine Sibyl, first recorded in Latin around the year 1000; its legend proved particularly adaptable to rulers all over Europe, containing as it did a list of emperors and kings leading up to the Last Emperor which could be revised or added to as political and dynastic circumstances required. It still had great currency in the fifteenth century.

== Catholic tradition ==
The concept of the Great King features prominently in mystical and folk traditions, as well as writings of people thought to have been granted gifts of prophecy or special visitations by messengers from heaven (such as angels, saints, or Christ). The Great Catholic Monarch was very popular in folklore until the 18th century Enlightenment.

In 19th century France the idea of a Great Monarch was combined with legitimist expectations of Henri, Count of Chambord as well as Bonapartism. The French writer and Traditionalist Catholic Yves Dupont has opined that the Great Monarch will have a restorationist character and that he will restore European Catholic royalty, destroy the power of heretics and atheists, and successfully convert many Muslims and Jews to the Faith.

The Catechism of the Catholic Church speaks only of Christ as the king who is to be manifested in "the last days". It speaks of this manifestation as associated by his recognition by "all Israel" and preceded by the Church's ultimate trial, "a religious deception offering men an apparent solution to their problems at the price of apostasy from the truth. The supreme religious deception is that of the Antichrist, a pseudo-messianism by which man glorifies himself in place of God and of his Messiah come in the flesh". It makes no mention of the coming of any Great Catholic Monarch, whether French or German or of any continent.

== See also ==
- Four kingdoms of Daniel
- Grand Monarch
- King Arthur's messianic return
- Prester John
- Sacred king
- Second Coming
- Son of perdition
- Succession of the Roman Empire
- Tiburtine Sibyl
- Translatio imperii

== Bibliography ==
- S.N., Mirabilis Liber, 1522
- Marquis de la Franquerie de la Tour, André Lesage, Le Saint Pape et le grand monarque d'après les prophéties, Editions de Chiré, Chiré-en-Montreuil, 1980 ISBN ...
- Alexander, Paul J., Byzantium and the Migration of Literary Works and Motifs: The Legend of the Last Roman Emperor, in Medievalia et Humanistica, NS 2 (1971), p. 47 ISSN ...
- Alexander, Paul J., The Medieval Legend of the Last Roman Emperor and Its Messianic Origin, Journal of the Warburg and Courtauld Institutes, 41 (1978), pp. 1–15 ISSN ...
- Baethgen, Friedrich, Der Engelpapst: Vortrag gehalten am 15. Januar 1933 in öffentlicher Sitzung der Königsberger Gelehrten Gesellschaft, M. Niemeyer, Halle (Saale), 1933 OCLC 9819016
- Bertin, Francis, La révolution et la parousie du grand monarque, in Politica Hermetica, 3 (1989), pp. ... ISSN ...
- Birch, Desmond A., Trial, Tribulation & Triumph: Before, During, and After Antichrist, Queenship Publishing Company, ..., 1997 ISBN 978-1-882972-73-9
- Bonura, Christopher J. (2025). A Prophecy of Empire: The Apocalypse of Pseudo-Methodius from Late Antique Mesopotamia to the Global Medieval Imagination. University of California Press. ISBN 978-0-520-41825-7.
- Gabriele, Matthew, An Empire of Memory: The Legend of Charlemagne, the Franks, and Jerusalem before the First Crusade, Oxford University Press, Oxford, 2011 ISBN 978-0-19-959144-2
- Möhring, Hannes, Der Weltkaiser der Endzeit, Jan Thorbecke Verlag, Stuttgart, 1999 ISBN 978-3-7995-4254-8
- Muraise, Eric, Histoire et légende du grand monarque, Albin Michel, Paris, 1975 ISBN 2-253-02052-4
- Otto, Helen Tzima, The Great Monarch and WWIII in Orthodox, Roman Catholic, and Scriptural Prophecies, The Verenikia Press, Rock Hill, 2000 ISBN 1-891663-01-1
- Rubenstein, Jay, Armies of Heaven: The First Crusade and the Quest for Apocalypse, Basic Books, 2011 ISBN 978-0-4650-1929-8
