= Second Epistle to the Thessalonians =

Book of the New Testament

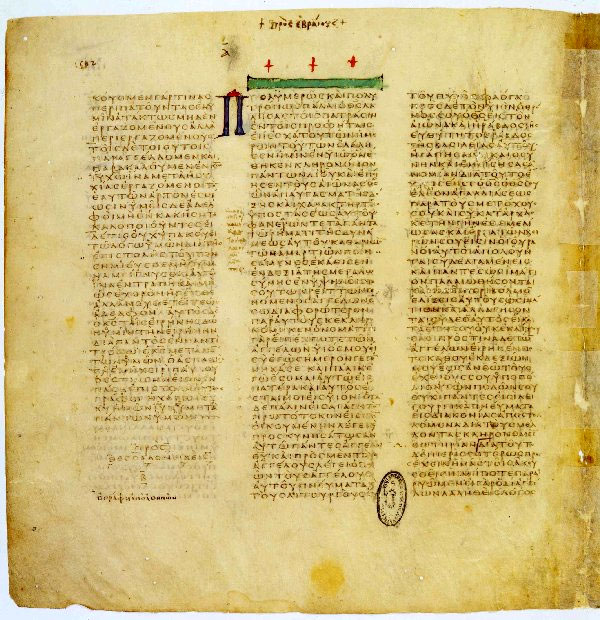
2 Thessalonians 3:11–18, along with the beginning of Hebrews in Codex Vaticanus (c. AD 350)

The Second Epistle to the Thessalonians (Note: The book is sometimes called the Second Letter of Paul to the Thessalonians, or simply 2 Thessalonians. It is most commonly abbreviated as "2 Thess.") is a Pauline epistle from the New Testament of the Christian Bible. It is traditionally attributed to Paul the Apostle, with Timothy as a co-author. Its authorship is disputed, with critical commentators being evenly divided on Pauline authorship. According to a poll at the British New Testament Conference in Nottingham on the 2nd of September 2011, a slight majority leaning on the side of its authenticity. Those who reject its authenticity point to differences in style and theology between it and the First Epistle to the Thessalonians, which is undisputed.

Scholars who support its authenticity view it as having been written around 51–52 AD, shortly after the First Epistle. Those who see it as a later composition assign a date of around 80–115 AD.

The original text was written in Koine Greek.

== Composition ==
Paul, and Silvanus, and Timotheus, unto the church of the Thessalonians [...]

— First verse of the epistle (King James version)

The authenticity of this epistle is still in dispute. James D. G. Dunn finds a “roughly even split among critical commentators on Colossians and 2 Thessalonians.” A survey of 111 scholars from the British New Testament Conference in 2011 found 63 in favor of authenticity, while 13 rejected Pauline authorship and 35 felt uncertain. Even assuming that it is authentic, this epistle was not sent by Paul alone, but by three people: Paul, Silvanus, and Timothy.

As Professor Ernest Best, New Testament scholar, explains the problem:

[I]f we only possessed Second Thessalonians few scholars would doubt that Paul wrote it; but when Second Thessalonians is put alongside First Thessalonians then doubts appear. There is a great dissimilarity between the two; this is not only one of words, small phrases and concepts but extends to the total structure of the two letters which is in addition different from what is taken to be the standard Pauline form. At the same time the second letter is alleged to be less intimate and personal in tone than the first, and in some of its teaching, particularly in relation to eschatology, to conflict with the first.

— Ernest Best, The First and Second Epistles to the Thessalonians

The structures of the two letters (to which Best refers) include opening greetings (1 Thessalonians 1:1a, 2 Thessalonians 1:1–2) and closing benedictions (1 Thessalonians 5:28, 2 Thessalonians 3:16d–18) which frame two, balancing, sections (AA'). In 2 Thessalonians these begin with similar successions of nine Greek words, at 1:3 and 2:13. The opening letter section (1:3–2:12) itself comprises two halves, 1:3–12 (where the introductory piece, A, is 1:3–5; the first development, B, is 1:6–10; and the paralleling and concluding development, B', is 1:11–12) and 2:1–12 (with pieces: A 2:1–4, B 2:5–7, B' 2:8–12).

The second, balancing, letter section (2:13–3:16c) also comprises two halves: 2:13–3:5 (with pieces: A 2:13–14, B 2:15–17, B' 3:1–5) and 3:6–16c (with pieces: A 3:6–9, B 3:10–12, B' 3:13-16c). Of the twelve pieces in 2 Thessalonians, seven begin with 'brother' introductions. Of the eighteen pieces in 1 Thessalonians, fourteen begin with 'brother' introductions. In both letters, the sections balance in size and focus, and in many details. In 2 Thessalonians, in 2:5 and 3:10, for example, there is a structural balance of the use of "when I was with you..." and "when we were with you...".

=== Support for authenticity ===
One piece of evidence for the authenticity of the epistle is that it was included in Marcion's canon and the Muratorian fragment. It was also mentioned by name by Irenaeus, and quoted by Ignatius, Justin, and Polycarp.

George Milligan argued that a church which possessed an authentic letter of Paul would be unlikely to accept a fake addressed to them. This argument was similarly supported by Colin Nicholl, who has put forward a substantial argument for the authenticity of Second Thessalonians. He points out that "the pseudonymous view is [...] more vulnerable than most of its advocates conceded. [...] The lack of consensus regarding a date and destination [...] reflects a dilemma for this position: on the one hand, the date needs to be early enough for the letter to have been accepted as Pauline [...] [on] the other hand, the date and destination need to be such that the author could be confident that no contemporary of 1 Thessalonians [...] could have exposed 2 Thessalonians as a [...] forgery."

Another scholar who argues for the authenticity of this letter is Jerome Murphy-O'Connor. Admitting that there are stylistic problems between 2 Thessalonians and 1 Thessalonians, he argues that part of the problem is due to the composite nature of 2 Thessalonians. Murphy-O'Connor, along with many others scholars, argues that the current text of 2 Thessalonians is the product of merging two or more authentic letters of Paul. Once the text of this interpolated letter is removed and the two letters compared, Murphy-O'Connor asserts that this objection is "drastically weakened", and concludes, "The arguments against the authenticity of 2 Thessalonians are so weak that it is preferable to accept the traditional ascription of the letter to Paul."

Those who believe Paul was the author of 2 Thessalonians also note how Paul drew attention to the authenticity of the letter by signing it himself: "I, Paul, write this greeting with my own hand, which is how I write in every letter." Bruce Metzger writes, "Paul calls attention to his signature, which was added by his own hand as a token of genuineness to every letter of his (3:17)." While some draw attention to this verse as an excessive attempt of a forging author to convince his readers of authenticity, a parallel stock phrase has been noted by some in the authentic Galatians 6:11. A parallel has also been noted among Cyprian where he stresses in his 9th epistle, under potential fears of the circulation of a forged letter, that examination of the style of the signature should be used in order to authenticate the letter: "examine whether both the writing and the signature are yours and write back to us what the matter is in truth."

Other scholars who hold to authenticity include Gregory Beale, Gene L. Green, Ivor H. Jones, Leon Morris, Ben Witherington III, Paul Foster, Tom Wright, and Kretzmann. According to Leon Morris in 1986, the majority of current scholars at that time still held to Paul's authorship of 2 Thessalonians.

=== Opposition to authenticity ===
At least as early as 1798, when Johann Ernst Christian Schmidt published his opinion, Paul's authorship of this epistle was questioned. More recent challenges to this traditional belief came from scholars such as William Wrede in 1903 and Alfred Loisy in 1933, who challenged the traditional view of the authorship.

Regarding Nicholl's argument for authenticity, on the one hand, it is worth noting that at least some forged Pauline letters were written well after a date modern scholars might deem early enough for the letter to be considered Pauline, such as the Third Epistle to the Corinthians, estimated to have been written around 160-170 CE; forgers were not forced to write close in time to the writers they imitated. On the other hand, it is not clear that a forger would need to ensure his writing was not contemporaneous with 1 Thessalonians if he was not actually writing the letter to Thessalonica; furthermore, if Nicholls is correct in believing 2 Thessalonians to be authentic, then Paul in 2 Thessalonians 2:2 provides evidence that forgeries in his name already existed in his own lifetime, discrediting his argument that forgers would take care to write far enough apart in time to ensure contemporaries could not denounce the forgery.

In his book Forged, New Testament scholar Bart D. Ehrman puts forward some of the most common arguments against the authenticity of 2 Thessalonians. For example, he argues that the views concerning the Second Coming of Christ expressed in 2 Thessalonians differ so strikingly from those found in 1 Thessalonians that they cannot be written by the same author.

Several modern scholars agree with Ehrman that 2 Thessalonians was not written by Paul but by an associate or disciple after his death. Scholars include Beverly Roberts Gaventa, Vincent Smiles, Udo Schnelle, Eugene Boring, and Joseph Kelly. Norman Perrin observes, "The best understanding of 2 Thessalonians [...] is to see it as a deliberate imitation of 1 Thessalonians, updating the apostle's thought." Perrin bases this claim on his hypothesis that prayer at the time usually treated God the Father as ultimate judge, rather than Jesus.

Daryl Schmidt performed a detailed syntactical comparison between 2 Thess and other disputed letters attributed to Paul in comparison to his undisputed letters and concluded that 2 Thess is highly unlikely to have been written by Paul. Among the undisputed letters, there are five embedded clauses at four layers of embeddedness in the longest sentence in the opening thanksgiving section of the Letter to the Romans, six clauses at four layers in 1 Corinthians, five clauses at three levels in 2 Corinthians, six clauses at one level in Philippians, and ten clauses at five levels in 1 Thessalonians. 2 Thessalonians, in contrast, has an uncharacteristic twenty-two clauses at fifteen levels of embeddedness in the equivalent section. Schmidt demonstrates similar anomalies in 2 Thess' structures of genitive constructions in non-phrase strings, and its frequent reliance on coordinating and subordinating constructions, and concludes that — in combination with other evidence — it is highly unlikely to have been written by Paul.

== Background ==
Thessalonica was the second city in Europe where Paul helped to create an organized Christian community. At some point after the first letter was sent, probably soon, some of the Thessalonians grew concerned over whether those who had died would share in the parousia. This letter was written in response to this concern. The problem then arises, as Raymond Brown points out, whether this letter is an authentic writing of Paul or written by one of his followers in his name.

If this letter is authentic, then it might have been written soon after Paul's first letter to this community—or possibly years later. Brown notes that Paul "most likely visited Thessalonica several times in his journeys to Macedonia". However, if the letter is not authentic, Brown notes that "in some ways interpretation becomes more complex." Brown believes that the majority of scholars who advocate pseudonymity would place it towards the end of the first century, the same time that Revelation was written. These scholars emphasize the appearance of "that man of sin" in the second chapter of this letter, whether this personage is identified with the Antichrist of 1 John and Revelation, or with a historical person like Caligula.

== Content ==
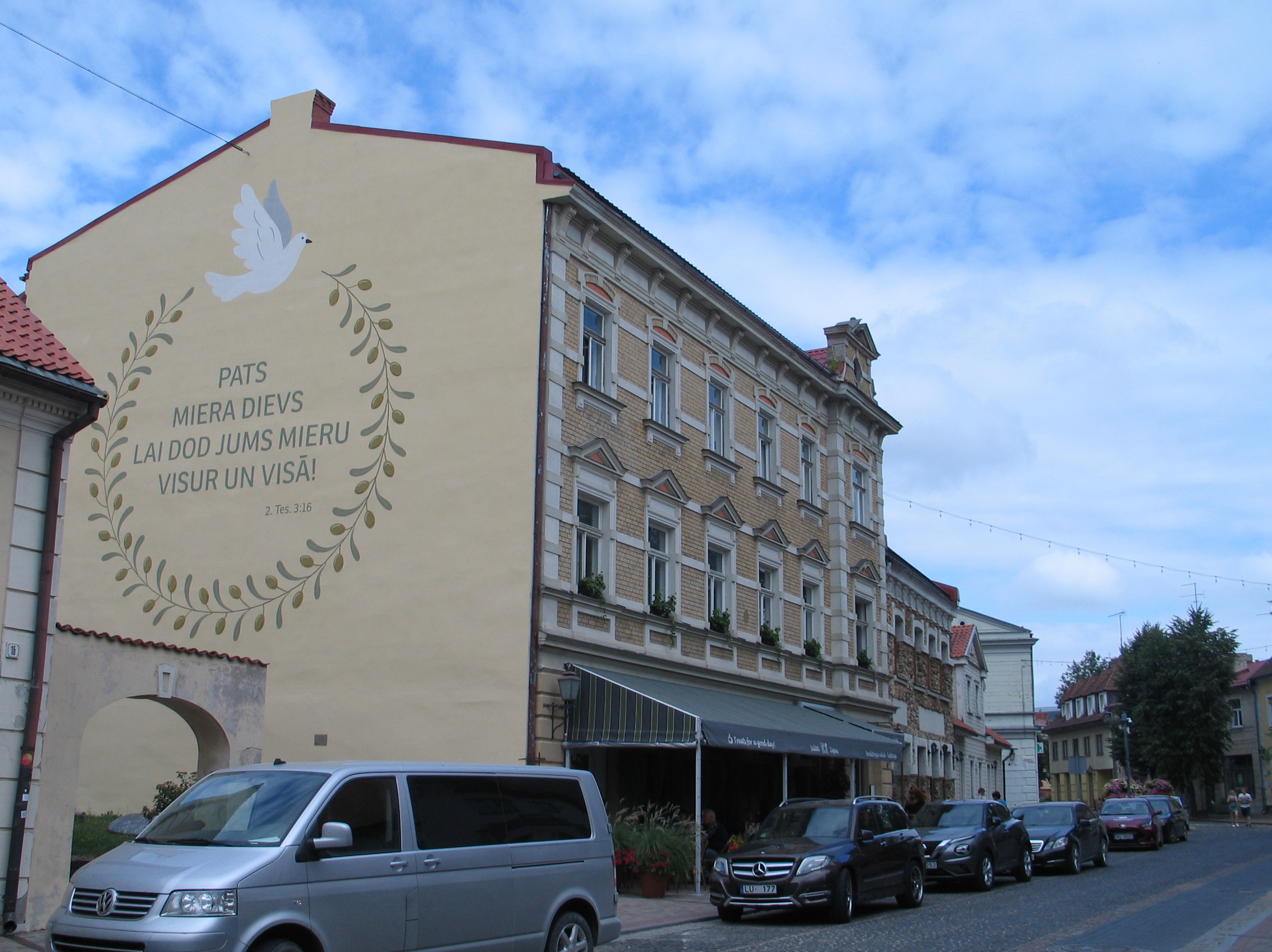
Quotation from 2 Thess 3:16 on a wall in Cēsis, Latvia (English NIV: "Now may the Lord of peace himself give you peace at all times and in every way.")

The traditional view is that the second epistle to the Thessalonians was probably written from Corinth not many months after the first.

Biblical commentator and pastor John MacArthur writes, "The emphasis is on how to maintain a church with an effective testimony in proper response to sound eschatology and obedience to the truth."

Paul opens the letter praising this church for their faithfulness and perseverance in the face of persecution:

We ought always to give thanks to God for you, brethren, as is only fitting, because your faith is greatly enlarged, and the love of each one of you toward one another grows ever greater; therefore, we ourselves speak proudly of you among the churches of God for your perseverance and faith in the midst of all your persecutions and afflictions which you endure

— 2 Thessalonians, 1:3–5 NASB

The letter contains a whole chapter regarding the second advent of Christ, among other themes and instructions.

From the inference of 2:1–2, the Thessalonians were faced with a false teaching, saying that Christ had already returned. This error is corrected in chapter 2 (2:1–12), where Paul tells the Thessalonians that a great tribulation must occur before Christ's return. Seeing as how this series of events has not yet happened, his argument reads, Christ cannot have returned yet. He then expresses thanks that his readers were the elect of God, chosen for salvation and saved by his grace through faith, and thus not susceptible to the deception of the "Great Apostasy," (2 Thessalonians 2:13–14) first mentioned here as is the "Katechon" (2 Thessalonians 2:6–7).

In 2 Thessalonians 2:15, Paul instructs his readers to "[h]old fast to the traditions (Ancient Greek: παραδόσεις, Latin: traditiones) which you were taught, whether by word of mouth or by our letter." Quoting this verse, in his On the Holy Spirit, Basil the Great writes, "These [traditions] have been passed on by word of mouth from Paul or from the other apostles, without necessarily being written down," and mentions the Trinitarian confession of faith as an example of "unwritten tradition". Cyril of Jerusalem shares a similar view in his Catechetical Lectures, argues that the traditions stated by Paul should be preserved and memorized, at a minimum in the form of the Creed. In his homily on this verse, John Chrysostom differentiates oral tradition from written tradition. At that time, the oral tradition has been defined as the "tradition" and the written tradition as "Scripture", united together in "the authenticity of their apostolic origin". Everett Ferguson says Paul's reference to tradition implicates that "what was delivered was from the Lord", and John Stott calls the tradition (Ancient Greek: παράδοσις, romanized: paradosis) "apostolic 'tradition'".

The letter continues by encouraging the Thessalonian church to stand firm in their faith, and to "keep away from every brother who leads an unruly life and not according to the tradition which you received from us [...] do not associate with him, so that he will be put to shame. Yet do not regard him as an enemy, but admonish him as a brother" (2 Thessalonians 3:6–7, 14–15).

Paul ends this letter by saying, "I, Paul, write this greeting with my own hand, and this is a distinguishing mark in every letter; this is the way I write. The grace of our Lord Jesus Christ be with you all" (2 Thessalonians 3:17–18). Macarthur writes, "Paul added an identifying signature (cf. 1 Corinthians 16:21; Colossians 4:18) so his readers could be sure he was truly the author."

A passage from this book reading "For even when we were with you, this we commanded you, that if any would not work, neither should he eat", (3:10), was later adapted by Vladimir Lenin as an adage of the Soviet Union: "he who does not work, neither shall he eat".

== Surviving early manuscripts ==
Some early manuscripts containing the text of this book are:

- Papyrus 30 (3rd century)
- Codex Vaticanus (325–350)
- Codex Sinaiticus (330–360)
- Codex Alexandrinus (400–440)
- Codex Freerianus (~450; partial)
- Codex Claromontanus (~550)

== See also ==
- Textual variants in the Second Epistle to the Thessalonians
- Authorship of the Pauline epistles
- Thessaloniki
- Silas

== Notes ==
Second Epistle to the Thessalonians Pauline Epistle
Preceded by First Thessalonians	New Testament; Books of the Bible	Succeeded by First pastoral epistle to Timothy
