= Antichrist =

Figure in the New Testament

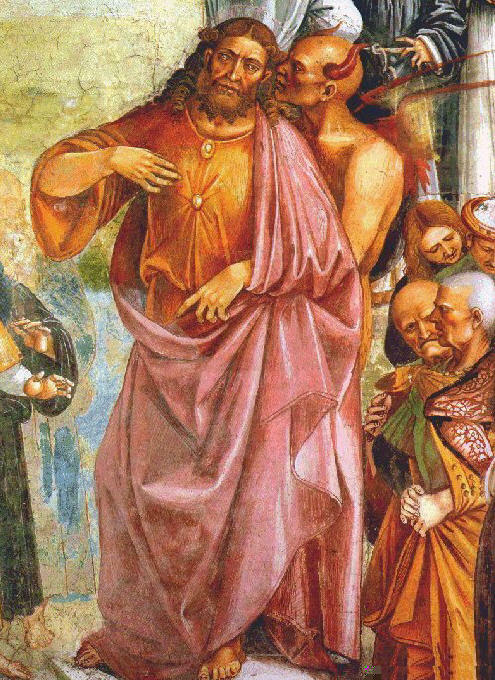
The Devil whispers to the Antichrist; detail from Sermons and Deeds of the Antichrist, fresco by Luca Signorelli, 1501, Orvieto Cathedral

In Christian eschatology, Antichrist, or in broader eschatology, Anti-Messiah, refers to a kind of entity prophesied by the Bible to oppose Jesus Christ and falsely substitute himself as a savior in Christ's place before the Second Coming. The term Antichrist (including one plural form) is found four times in the New Testament, solely in the First and Second Epistle of John. Antichrist is announced as one "who denies the Father and the Son."

The similar term pseudokhristos or "false Christ" is also found in the Gospels. In Matthew (chapter 24) and Mark (chapter 13), Jesus alerts his disciples not to be deceived by the false prophets, who will claim themselves to be the Christ, performing "great signs and wonders". Three other images often associated with Antichrist are the "little horn" in Daniel's final vision, the "man of sin" in Paul the Apostle's Second Epistle to the Thessalonians, and the Beast of the Sea in the Book of Revelation.

In the New Testament, particularly in the Johannine epistles, the term does not refer to a single individual but rather to a category of people opposing Christ, often called deceivers or false teachers. Early Church Fathers like Irenaeus, Tertullian, and Hippolytus expanded on the idea, sometimes linking the Antichrist to the Roman Empire, the tribe of Dan, or the eschatological “man of lawlessness” described in 2 Thessalonians. Over time, interpretations varied, including figurative, historical, and personal applications of the concept.

During the Reformation, many Protestant leaders identified the Papacy as the Antichrist, viewing it as a present manifestation rather than a future individual. This historicist interpretation was shared by figures such as Martin Luther, John Calvin, and John Knox, who associated the Pope with the "man of sin" and other biblical symbols of opposition to Christ. Catholic, Orthodox, and other Christian traditions generally see the Antichrist as a future deceiver or a manifestation of evil, sometimes inhabited by Satan, whose deception challenges human allegiance to God. Non-Christian traditions, such as Judaism and Islam, have analogous figures—like Armilus in Jewish eschatology or the Al-Masih ad-Dajjal in Islamic eschatology—representing ultimate evil opposing divine will.

== Etymology ==
Antichrist is translated from the combination of two ancient Greek words ἀντί + Χριστός (anti + Christos). In Greek, Χριστός means "anointed one" and the word Christ derives from it. "Ἀντί" means not only anti in the sense of "against" and "opposite of", but also "in place of".

== History ==
=== New Testament ===
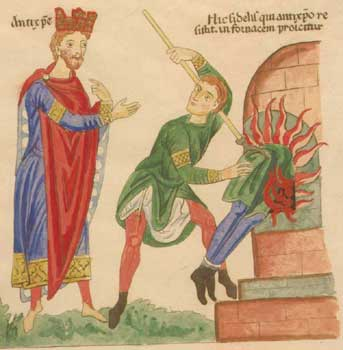
The Antichrist (the figure on the left, with the attributes of a king) by Herrad of Landsberg (about 1180), from the 12th-century Hortus deliciarum

Whether the New Testament contains an individual Antichrist is disputed. The Greek term antikhristos originates in 1 John. The similar term pseudokhristos ("False Messiah") is also first found in the New Testament, but never used by Josephus in his accounts of various false messiahs. The concept of an antikhristos is not found in Jewish writings in the period 500 BC–50 AD. However, Bernard McGinn conjectures that the concept may have been generated by the frustration of Jews subject to often-capricious Seleucid or Roman rule, who found the nebulous Jewish idea of a Satan who is more of an opposing angel of God in the heavenly court insufficiently humanised and personalised to be a satisfactory incarnation of evil and threat.

The five uses of the term "antichrist" or "antichrists" in the Johannine epistles do not clearly present a single latter-day individual Antichrist. The articles "the deceiver" or "the antichrist" are usually seen as marking out a certain category of persons, rather than an individual.

Children, it is the last hour! As you have heard that antichrist is coming, so now many antichrists have come. From this we know that it is the last hour.

— 1 John 2:18 NRSV (1989)

Who is the liar but the one who denies that Jesus is the Christ? This is the antichrist, the one who denies the Father and the Son.

— 1 John 2:22 NRSV (1989)

By this you know the Spirit of God: every spirit that confesses that Jesus Christ has come in the flesh is from God, and every spirit that does not confess Jesus is not from God. And this is the spirit of the antichrist, of which you have heard that it is coming; and now it is already in the world.

— 1 John 4:2–3 NRSV (1989)

Many deceivers have gone out into the world, those who do not confess that Jesus Christ has come in the flesh; any such person is the deceiver and the antichrist!

— 2 John 1:7 NRSV (1989)

Consequently, attention for an individual Antichrist figure focuses on the second chapter of 2 Thessalonians. However, the term "antichrist" is never used in this passage:

As to the coming of our Lord Jesus Christ and our being gathered together to him, we beg you, brothers and sisters, not to be quickly shaken in mind or alarmed, either by spirit or by word or by letter, as though from us, to the effect that the day of the Lord is already here. Let no one deceive you in any way; for that day will not come unless the rebellion comes first and the lawless one is revealed, the one destined for destruction. He opposes and exalts himself above every so-called god or object of worship, so that he takes his seat in the temple of God, declaring himself to be God.

— 2 Thessalonians 2:1–4 NRSV (1989)

For the mystery of lawlessness is already at work, but only until the one who now restrains it is removed. And then the lawless one will be revealed, whom the Lord Jesus will destroy with the breath of his mouth, annihilating him by the manifestation of his coming. The coming of the lawless one is apparent in the working of Satan, who uses all power, signs, lying wonders, and every kind of wicked deception for those who are perishing, because they refused to love the truth and so be saved.

— 2 Thessalonians 2:7–10 NRSV (1989)

The latter of these passages is also the primary scriptural source concerning the Katechon, the "one who now restrains" the coming of the Antichrist. The identity of this person, if it is a person, is mysterious and the subject of debate.

Although the word "antichrist" (Greek antikhristos) is used only in the Epistles of John, the similar word "pseudochrist" (Greek pseudokhristos, meaning "false messiah") is used by Jesus in the Gospels:

For false messiahs and false prophets will appear and produce great signs and omens, to lead astray, if possible, even the elect.

— Matthew 24:24 and Mark 13:22 NRSV (1989)

=== Early Church ===
The second- or first-century book Odes of Solomon, written by an Essene convert to Christianity, makes mention of the Antichrist in figurative terms, where the redeemer overcomes the monstrous dragon.

The only one of the late 1st-/early 2nd-century Apostolic Fathers to use the term is Polycarp (c. 69 – c. 155), who warned the Philippians that everyone who preached false doctrine was an antichrist. His use of the term Antichrist follows that of the New Testament in not identifying a single personal Antichrist, but a class of people.

Irenaeus (2nd century AD – c. 202) wrote Against Heresies to refute the teachings of the Gnostics. In Book V of Against Heresies he addresses the figure of the Antichrist referring to him as the "recapitulation of apostasy and rebellion." He uses "666", the Number of the Beast from Revelation 13:18, to numerologically decode several possible names. Some names that he loosely proposed were "Teitan", "Evanthos", "Lateinos" ("Latin" or pertaining to the Roman Empire). In his exegesis of Daniel 7:21, he stated that the ten horns of the beast will be the Roman Empire divided into ten kingdoms before the Antichrist's arrival. Additionally, he stated that the antichrist would be of the tribe of Dan, evoking Jeremiah 8:16. However, his readings of the Antichrist were more in broader theological terms rather than within a historical context.

The non-canonical Ascension of Isaiah presents a detailed exposition of the Antichrist as Belial and Nero.

Tertullian (c. 160 – c. 220 AD) held that the Roman Empire was the restraining force written about by Paul in 2 Thessalonians 2:7–8. The fall of the Western Roman Empire and the disintegration of the ten provinces of the Roman Empire into ten kingdoms were to make way for the Antichrist.

By, "For that day will not come unless the rebellion comes first," he [Paul] means indeed this present empire, "and the man of lawlessness is revealed"—that is to say, the Antichrist, "the son of destruction, who opposes and exalts himself above every so-called god or religion, so that he takes his seat in the temple of God, declaring himself to be God. Do you not remember that I told you these things when I was still with you? And you know what is now restraining him, so that he may be revealed when his time comes. For the mystery of lawlessness is already at work, but only until the one who now restrains it is removed." What obstacles are there but the Roman state, the rebellion of which, by being scattered into the ten kingdoms, will introduce the Antichrist upon its own ruins? "And then the lawless one will be revealed, whom the Lord will destroy with the breath of his mouth, annihilating him by the manifestation of his coming. The coming of the lawless one is apparent in the working of Satan, who uses all power, signs, lying wonders, and every kind of wicked deception for those who are perishing."

Hippolytus of Rome (c. 170 – c. 236) held that the Antichrist would come from the tribe of Dan and would rebuild the Jewish temple on the Temple Mount in order to reign from it. He identified the Antichrist with the Beast out of the Earth from the book of Revelation.

By the beast, then, coming up out of the earth, he means the kingdom of Antichrist; and by the two horns he means him and the false prophet after him. And in speaking of "horns like a lamb," he means that he will make himself like the Son of God, and set himself forward as king. And the terms, "it spoke like a dragon," mean that he is a deceiver, and not truthful.

Origen (185–254) refuted Celsus' view of the Antichrist. Origen, using scriptural citations from Daniel, Paul, and the Gospels argued:

Where is the absurdity, then, in holding that there exist among men, so to speak, two extremes—the one of virtue, and the other of its opposite; so that the perfection of virtue dwells in the man who realizes the ideal given in Jesus, from whom there flowed to the human race so great a conversion, and healing, and amelioration, while the opposite extreme is in the man who embodies the notion of him that is named Antichrist?... one of these extremes, and the best of the two, should be styled the Son of God, on account of His pre-eminence; and the other, who is diametrically opposite, be termed the son of the wicked demon, and of Satan, and of the devil. And, in the next place, since evil is specially characterized by its diffusion, and attains its greatest height when it simulates the appearance of the good, for that reason are signs, and marvels, and lying miracles found to accompany evil, through the cooperation of its father the devil.

=== Post-Nicene Christianity ===
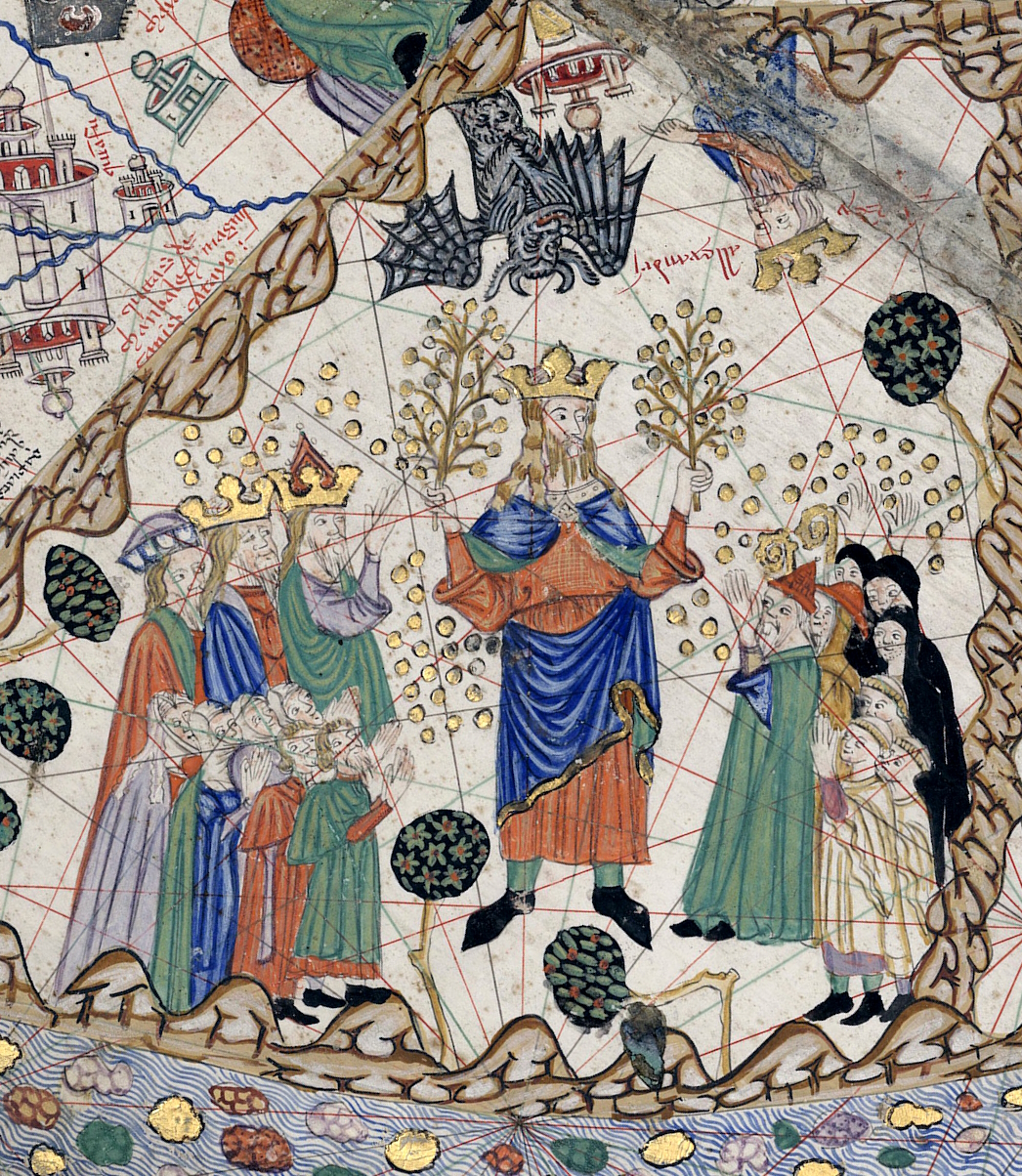
Antichrist in the Catalan Atlas (1375). The label reads: "Antichrist. He will be raised in Goraym of Galilea, and at the age of thirty he will start to preach in Jerusalem; contrary to the truth, he will proclaim that he is Christ, the living son of God. It is said that he will rebuild the Temple."

Cyril of Jerusalem, in the mid-4th century, delivered his 15th catechetical lecture about the Second Coming of Jesus Christ, in which he also lectures about the Antichrist, who will reign as the ruler of the world for three and a half years, before he is killed by Jesus Christ at the end of his three-and-a-half-year reign, shortly after which the Second Coming of Jesus Christ will happen.

Athanasius of Alexandria (c. 298–373) wrote that Arius of Alexandria is to be associated with the Antichrist, saying, "And ever since [the Council of Nicaea] has Arius's error been reckoned for a heresy more than ordinary, being known as Christ's foe, and harbinger of [the] Antichrist."

As part of his prediction that the world would end before 400 CE, Martin of Tours (c. 336 - 397) wrote that "There is no doubt that the Antichrist has already been born. Firmly established already in his early years, he will, after reaching maturity, achieve supreme power."

John Chrysostom (c. 347–407) warned against speculating about the Antichrist, saying, "Let us not therefore enquire into these things". He preached that by knowing Paul's description of the Antichrist in 2 Thessalonians, Christians would avoid deception.

Jerome (c. 347–420) warned that those substituting false interpretations for the actual meaning of scripture belonged to the "synagogue of the Antichrist". "He that is not of Christ is of Antichrist", he wrote to Pope Damasus I. He believed that "the mystery of lawlessness" written about by Paul in 2 Thessalonians 2:7 was already in action when "every one chatters about his views." To Jerome, the power restraining this mystery of lawlessness was the Roman Empire, but as it fell this restraining force was removed. He warned a noble woman of Gaul:

He that letteth is taken out of the way, and yet we do not realize that Antichrist is near. Yes, Antichrist is near whom the Lord Jesus Christ "shall consume with the spirit of his mouth." "Woe unto them," he cries, "that are with child, and to them that give suck in those days." ... Savage tribes in countless numbers have overrun all parts of Gaul. The whole country between the Alps and the Pyrenees, between the Rhine and the Ocean, has been laid waste by hordes of Quadi, Vandals, Sarmatians, Alans, Gepids, Herules, Saxons, Burgundians, Alemanni, and—alas for the commonweal!—even Pannonians.

In his Commentary on Daniel, Jerome noted, "Let us not follow the opinion of some commentators and suppose him to be either the Devil or some demon, but rather, one of the human race, in whom Satan will wholly take up his residence in bodily form." Instead of rebuilding the Jewish Temple to reign from, Jerome thought the Antichrist sat in God's Temple inasmuch as he made "himself out to be like God." He refuted Porphyry's idea that the "little horn" mentioned in Daniel chapter 7 was Antiochus IV Epiphanes by noting that the "little horn" is defeated by an eternal, universal ruler, right before the final judgment. Instead, he advocated that the "little horn" was the Antichrist:

We should therefore concur with the traditional interpretation of all the commentators of the Christian Church, that at the end of the world, when the Roman Empire is to be destroyed, there shall be ten kings who will partition the Roman world amongst themselves. Then an insignificant eleventh king will arise, who will overcome three of the ten kings... after they have been slain, the seven other kings also will bow their necks to the victor.

Circa 380, an apocalyptic pseudo-prophecy falsely attributed to the Tiburtine Sibyl describes Constantine as victorious over Gog and Magog. Later on, it predicts:

When the Roman empire shall have ceased, then the Antichrist will be openly revealed and will sit in the House of the Lord in Jerusalem. While he is reigning, two very famous men, Elijah and Enoch, will go forth to announce the coming of the Lord. Antichrist will kill them and after three days they will be raised up by the Lord. Then there will be a great persecution, such as has not been before nor shall be thereafter. The Lord will shorten those days for the sake of the elect, and the Antichrist will be slain by the power of God through Michael the Archangel on the Mount of Olives.

Augustine of Hippo (354–430) wrote "it is uncertain in what temple [the Antichrist] shall sit, whether in that ruin of the temple which was built by Solomon, or in the Church."

Gregory of Tours claimed that the antichrist would place his image to be worshipped in the temple in Jerusalem, he would assert himself to be Christ and would call for Christians to undergo circumcision.

Pope Gregory I wrote to the Byzantine Emperor Maurice in A.D. 597, concerning the titles of bishops, "I say with confidence that whoever calls or desires to call himself 'universal priest' in self-exaltation of himself is a precursor of the Antichrist."

By the end of the tenth century, Adso of Montier-en-Der, a Benedictine monk, compiled a biography of Antichrist based on a variety of exegetical and Sibylline sources; his account became one of the best-known descriptions of Antichrist in the Middle Ages.

De Antichristo libri undecim, published by Tomàs Maluenda in 1604, is considered the most complete treatise on the subject.

=== Pre-Reformation Western Church accusers ===
Woodcut showing the Antichrist, 1498

Arnulf, bishop of Orléans, disagreed with the policies and morals of Pope John XV. He expressed his views while presiding over the Council of Reims in A.D. 991. Arnulf accused John XV of being the Antichrist while also using the 2 Thessalonians passage about the "man of lawlessness" (or "lawless one"), saying: "Surely, if he is empty of charity and filled with vain knowledge and lifted up, he is Antichrist sitting in God's temple and showing himself as God." This incident is history's earliest record of anyone identifying a pope with the Antichrist (see Christian Historicism).

Pope Gregory VII (c. 1015 or 1029–1085), struggled against, in his own words, "a robber of temples, a perjurer against the Holy Roman Church, notorious throughout the whole Roman world for the basest of crimes, namely, Wilbert, plunderer of the holy church of Ravenna, Antichrist, and arch-heretic."

Cardinal Benno, on the opposite side of the Investiture Controversy, wrote long descriptions of abuses committed by Gregory VII, including necromancy, torture of a former friend upon a bed of nails, commissioning an attempted assassination, executions without trials, unjust excommunication, doubting the real presence of Christ in the Eucharist, and even burning it. Benno held that Gregory VII was "either a member of Antichrist, or Antichrist himself."

Eberhard II von Truchsees, Prince-Archbishop of Salzburg in 1241, denounced Pope Gregory IX at the Council of Regensburg as "that man of perdition, whom they call Antichrist, who in his extravagant boasting says, I am God, I cannot err." He argued that the ten kingdoms that the Antichrist is involved with were the "Turks, Greeks, Egyptians, Africans, Spaniards, French, English, Germans, Sicilians, and Italians who now occupy the provinces of Rome." He held that the papacy was the "little horn" of Daniel 7:8:

"A little horn has grown up" with "eyes and mouth speaking great things", which is reducing three of these kingdoms (i.e. Sicily, Italy, and Germany) to subserviency, is persecuting the people of Christ and the saints of God with intolerable opposition, is confounding things human and divine, and is attempting things unutterable, execrable.

=== Protestant Reformation ===
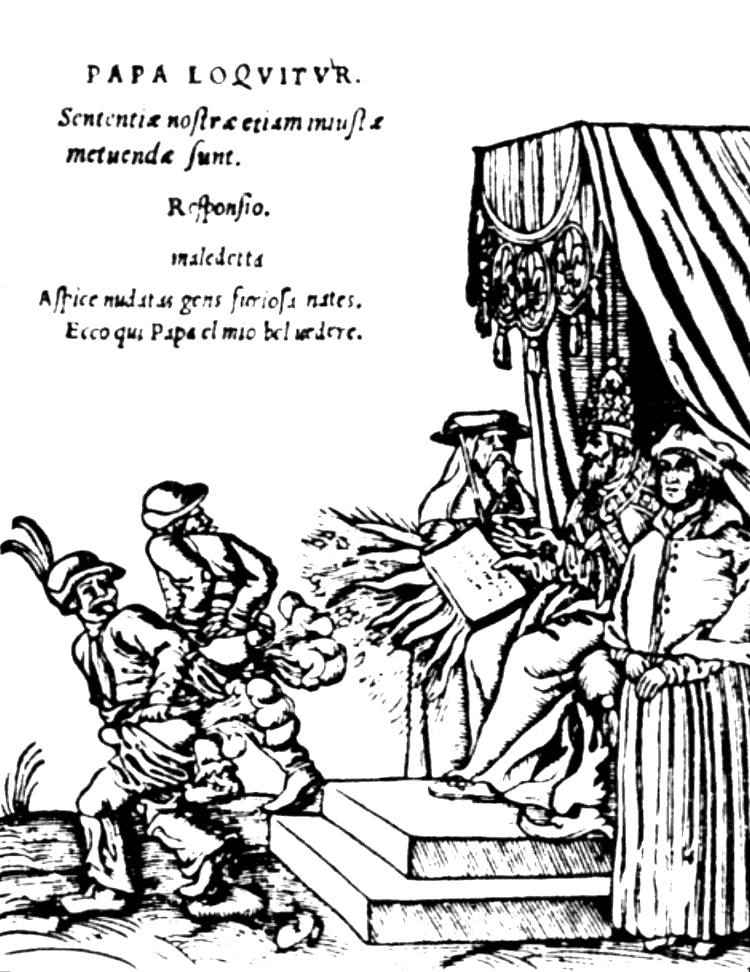
From a series of woodcuts (1545) usually referred to as the Papstspotbilder or Papstspottbilder in German or Depictions of the Papacy in English, by Lucas Cranach, commissioned by Martin Luther. Title: Kissing the Pope's Feet. German peasants respond to a papal bull of Pope Paul III. Caption reads: "Don't frighten us Pope, with your ban, and don't be such a furious man. Otherwise we shall turn around and show you our rears."

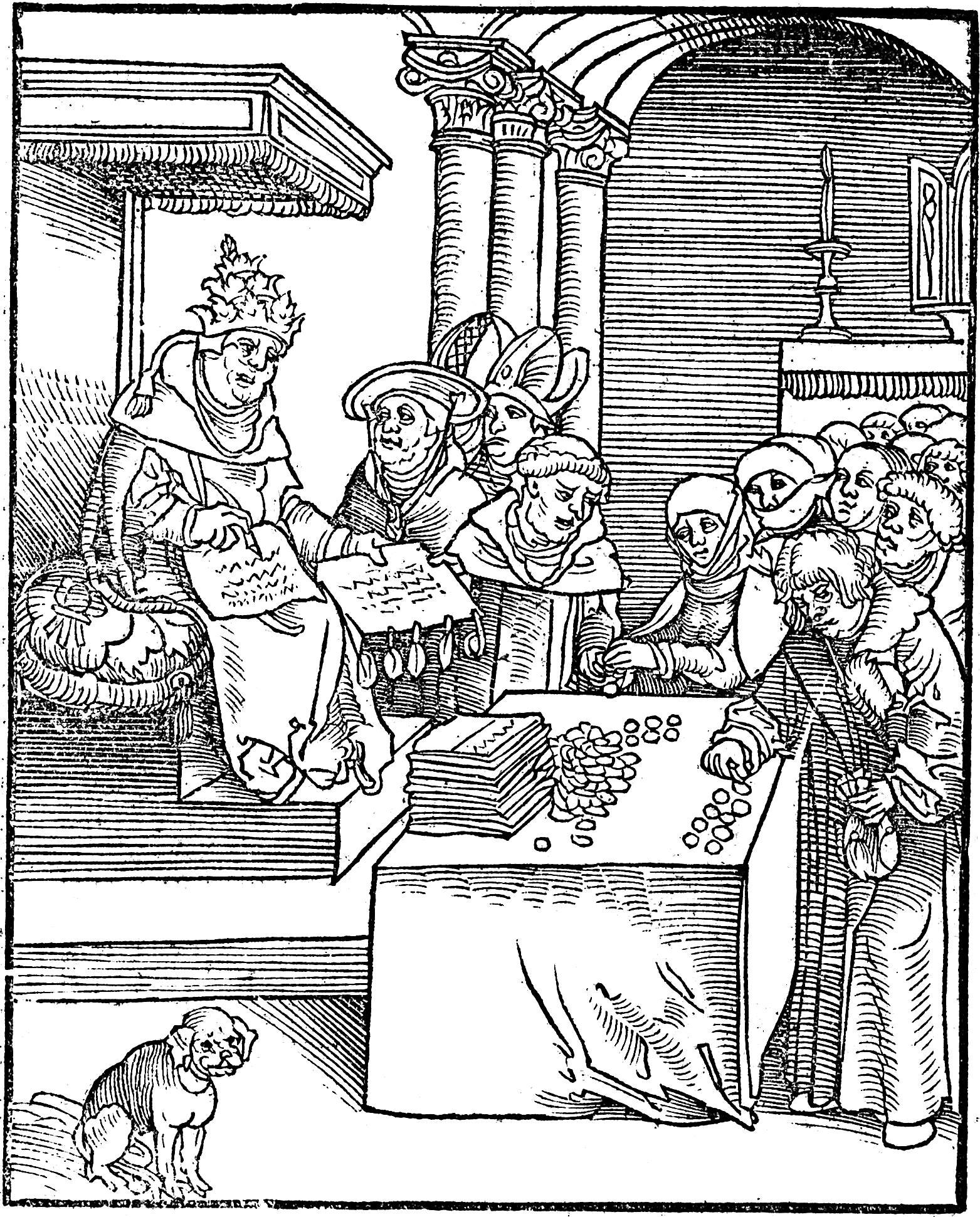
Passional Christi und Antichristi, by Lucas Cranach the Elder, from Luther's 1521 Passionary of the Christ and Antichrist. The Pope as the Antichrist, signing and selling indulgences.

Protestant Reformers, including John Wycliffe, Martin Luther, John Calvin, Thomas Cranmer, John Thomas, John Knox, Roger Williams, Cotton Mather, and John Wesley, as well as most Protestants of the 16th–18th centuries, felt that the Early Church had been led into the Great Apostasy by the Papacy and identified the Pope with the Antichrist. Luther declared that not just a pope from time to time was Antichrist, but the Papacy was Antichrist because they were "the representatives of an institution opposed to Christ". Calvin argued that "The name Antichrist does not designate a single individual, but a single kingdom which extends throughout many generations", saying that both Muhammad and the Catholic popes were "antichrists". The Centuriators of Magdeburg, a group of Lutheran scholars in Magdeburg headed by Matthias Flacius, wrote the 12-volume Magdeburg Centuries to discredit the Catholic Church and lead other Christians to recognize the Pope as the Antichrist. So, rather than expecting a single Antichrist to rule the earth during a future Tribulation period, Martin Luther, John Calvin, and other Protestant Reformers saw the Antichrist as a present feature in the world of their time, fulfilled in the Papacy.

Among the others who interpreted the biblical prophecy historically there were many Church Fathers; Justin Martyr wrote about the Antichrist: "He Whom Daniel foretells would have dominion for a time and times and a half, is even now at the door". Irenaeus wrote in Against Heresies about the coming of the Antichrist: "This Antichrist shall ... devastate all things ... But then, the Lord will come from Heaven on the clouds ... for the righteous". Tertullian looking to the Antichrist wrote: "He is to sit in the temple of God, and boast himself as being god. In our view, he is Antichrist as taught us in both the ancient and the new prophecies; and especially by the Apostle John, who says that 'already many false-prophets are gone out into the world' as the fore-runners of Antichrist". Hippolytus of Rome in his Treatise on Christ and Antichrist wrote: "As Daniel also says (in the words) 'I considered the Beast, and look! There were ten horns behind it—among which shall rise another (horn), an offshoot, and shall pluck up by the roots the three (that were) before it.' And under this, was signified none other than Antichrist." Athanasius of Alexandria clearly hold to the historical view in his many writings; in The Deposition of Arius, he wrote: "I addressed the letter to Arius and his fellows, exhorting them to renounce his impiety.... There have gone forth in this diocese at this time certain lawless men—enemies of Christ—teaching an apostasy which one may justly suspect and designate as a forerunner of Antichrist". Jerome wrote: "Says the apostle [Paul in the Second Epistle to the Thessalonians], 'Unless the Roman Empire should first be desolated, and antichrist proceed, Christ will not come.'" He also identifies the little horn of Daniel 7:8 and 7:24–25 which "He shall speak as if he were God."

Some Franciscans had considered the Emperor Frederick II a positive Antichrist who would purify the Catholic Church from opulence, riches and clergy.

Historicist interpretations of Book of Revelation usually included the identification of one or more of the following:

- the Antichrist (1 and 2 John);
- the Beast of Revelation 13;
- the Man of Sin, or Man of Lawlessness, of 2 Thessalonians 2 (2:1–12);
- the "Little horn" of Daniel 7 and 8;
- The Abomination of desolation of Daniel 9, 11, and 12; and
- the Whore of Babylon of Revelation 17.

The Protestant Reformers tended to hold the belief that the Antichrist power would be revealed so that everyone would comprehend and recognize that the Pope is the real, true Antichrist and not the vicar of Christ. Doctrinal works of literature published by the Lutherans, the Reformed Churches, the Presbyterians, the Baptists, the Anabaptists, and the Methodists contain references to the Pope as the Antichrist, including the Smalcald Articles, Article 4 (1537), the Treatise on the Power and Primacy of the Pope written by Philip Melanchthon (1537), the Westminster Confession, Article 25.6 (1646), and the 1689 Baptist Confession of Faith, Article 26.4. In 1754, John Wesley published his Explanatory Notes Upon the New Testament, which is currently a Doctrinal Standard of the United Methodist Church. In his notes on the Book of Revelation (chapter 13), he commented: "The whole succession of Popes from Gregory VII are undoubtedly Antichrists. Yet this hinders not, but that the last Pope in this succession will be more eminently the Antichrist, the Man of Sin, adding to that of his predecessors a peculiar degree of wickedness from the bottomless pit."

The identification of the Pope with the Antichrist was so ingrained in the Reformation Era, that Luther himself stated it repeatedly:

"This teaching [of the supremacy of the pope] shows forcefully that the Pope is the very Antichrist, who has exalted himself above, and opposed himself against Christ, because he will not permit Christians to be saved without his power, which, nevertheless, is nothing, and is neither ordained nor commanded by God".

and,

"nothing else than the kingdom of Babylon and of the very Antichrist. For who is the man of sin and the son of perdition, but he who by his teaching and his ordinances increases the sin and perdition of souls in the church; while he yet sits in the church as if he were God? All these conditions have now for many ages been fulfilled by the papal tyranny."

John Calvin similarly wrote:

"Though it be admitted that Rome was once the mother of all Churches, yet from the time when it began to be the seat of Antichrist it has ceased to be what it was before. Some persons think us too severe and censorious when we call the Roman Pontiff Antichrist. But those who are of this opinion do not consider that they bring the same charge of presumption against Paul himself, after whom we speak and whose language we adopt ... I shall briefly show that (Paul's words in II Thess. 2) are not capable of any other interpretation than that which applies them to the Papacy."

John Knox wrote on the Pope:

"Yea, to speak it in plain words; lest that we submit ourselves to Satan, thinking that we submit ourselves to Jesus Christ, for, as for your Roman kirk [church], as it is now corrupted, and the authority thereof, whereon stands the hope of your victory, I no more doubt but that it is the synagogue of Satan, and the head thereof, called the pope, to be that man of sin, of whom the apostle speaks."

Thomas Cranmer on the Antichrist wrote:

"Whereof it followeth Rome to be the seat of Antichrist, and the pope to be very antichrist himself. I could prove the same by many other scriptures, old writers, and strong reasons."

John Wesley, speaking of the identity given in the Bible of the Antichrist, wrote:

"In many respects, the Pope has an indisputable claim to those titles. He is, in an emphatical sense, the man of sin, as he increases all manner of sin above measure. And he is, too, properly styled, the son of perdition, as he has caused the death of numberless multitudes, both of his opposers and followers, destroyed innumerable souls, and will himself perish everlastingly. He it is that opposeth himself to the emperor, once his rightful sovereign; and that exalteth himself above all that is called God, or that is worshipped—Commanding angels, and putting kings under his feet, both of whom are called gods in scripture; claiming the highest power, the highest honour; suffering himself, not once only, to be styled God or vice-God. Indeed no less is implied in his ordinary title, "Most Holy Lord," or, "Most Holy Father." So that he sitteth—Enthroned. In the temple of God—Mentioned Rev. xi, 1. Declaring himself that he is God—Claiming the prerogatives which belong to God alone."

Roger Williams wrote about the Pope:

"the pretended Vicar of Christ on earth, who sits as God over the Temple of God, exalting himself not only above all that is called God, but over the souls and consciences of all his vassals, yea over the Spirit of Christ, over the Holy Spirit, yea, and God himself ... speaking against the God of heaven, thinking to change times and laws; but he is the Son of Perdition."

The identification of the Roman Catholic Church as the apostate power written of in the Bible as the Antichrist became evident to many as the Reformation began, including John Wycliffe, who was well known throughout Europe for his opposition to the doctrine and practices of the Catholic Church, which he believed had clearly deviated from the original teachings of the early Church and to be contrary to the Bible. Wycliffe himself tells (Sermones, III. 199) how he concluded that there was a great contrast between what the Church was and what it ought to be, and saw the necessity for reform. Along with John Hus, they had started the inclination toward ecclesiastical reforms of the Catholic Church.

When the Swiss Reformer Huldrych Zwingli became the pastor of the Grossmünster in Zurich (1518) he began to preach ideas on reforming the Catholic Church. Zwingli, who was a Catholic priest before he became a Reformer, often referred to the Pope as the Antichrist. He wrote: "I know that in it works the might and power of the Devil, that is, of the Antichrist".

The English Reformer William Tyndale held that while the Roman Catholic realms of that age were the empire of Antichrist, any religious organization that distorted the doctrine of the Old and New Testaments also showed the work of Antichrist. In his treatise The Parable of the Wicked Mammon, he expressly rejected the established Church teaching that looked to the future for an Antichrist to rise up, and he taught that Antichrist is a present spiritual force that will be with us until the end of the age under different religious disguises from time to time. Tyndale's translation of 2 Thessalonians, chapter 2, concerning the "Man of Lawlessness" reflected his understanding, but was significantly amended by later revisers, including the King James Bible committee, which followed the Vulgate more closely.

In 1973, the United States Conference of Catholic Bishops' Committee on Ecumenical and Interreligious Affairs and the USA National Committee of the Lutheran World Federation in the official Catholic–Lutheran dialogue officially signed an agreement on Papal Primacy and the Universal Church, including this passage:

In calling the pope the "Antichrist", the early Lutherans stood in a tradition that reached back into the eleventh century. Not only dissidents and heretics but even saints had called the bishop of Rome the "Antichrist" when they wished to castigate his abuse of power. What Lutherans understood as a papal claim to unlimited authority over everything and everyone reminded them of the apocalyptic imagery of Daniel 11, a passage that even prior to the Reformation had been applied to the pope as the Antichrist of the last days.

In 1988 Ian Paisley, Evangelical minister and founder of the Free Presbyterian Church of Ulster, made headlines in an infamous manner by accusing Pope John Paul II as the Antichrist during one of the pope's speeches before the European Parliament, which at the time Paisley was member. His accusation, and the reactions of both Pope John Paul II and other members of the European Parliament, was recorded on video.

The Wisconsin Evangelical Lutheran Synod states about the Pope and the Catholic Church:

There are two principles that mark the papacy as the Antichrist. One is that the pope takes to himself the right to rule the church that belongs only to Christ. He can make laws forbidding the marriage of priests, eating or not eating meat on Friday, birth control, divorce and remarriage, even where there are not such laws in the Bible. The second is that he teaches that salvation is not by faith alone but by faith and works. The present pope upholds and practices these principles. This marks his rule as antichristian rule in the church. All popes hold the same office over the church and promote the same antichristian belief so they all are part of the reign of the Antichrist. The Bible does not present the Antichrist as one man for one short time, but as an office held by a man through successive generations. It is a title like King of England.

Currently, many Protestant and Restorationist denominations still officially maintain that the Papacy is the Antichrist, such as the conservative Lutheran Churches and the Seventh-day Adventists.

=== Counter-Reformation ===
In the Counter-Reformation, the views of Preterism and Futurism were advanced by Catholic Jesuits beginning in the 16th century in response to the identification of the Papacy as Antichrist. These were rival methods of prophetic interpretation: the futurist and the preterist systems both are in conflict with the historicist method of interpretation.

Historically, preterists and non-preterists have agreed that the Jesuit Luis de Alcasar (1554–1613) wrote the first systematic preterist exposition of prophecy—Vestigatio arcani sensus in Apocalypsi (published in 1614)—during the Counter-Reformation.

== Christian views ==
=== Roman Catholicism ===
From the Fifth Council of the Lateran, the Catholic Church teaches that priests may not "preach or declare a fixed time for...the coming of antichrist..." The church also teaches that it must undergo trials before the Second Coming, and that the church's ultimate trial will be the mystery of iniquity. In Judaism, iniquity is a sin done out of moral failing. The mystery of iniquity, according to the church, will be a religious deception: Christians receiving alleged solutions to their problems at the cost of apostasy. The supreme religious deception, according to the church, will be the Antichrist's messianism: mankind glorifying himself rather than God and Jesus. The church teaches that this supreme deception is committed by people who claim to fulfill Israel's messianic hopes (world peace, immortality, end of evil and suffering, no more poverty or pollution, etc.), such as millenarianism and secular messianicism.

==== Popes ====
Pope Pius IX in the encyclical Quartus Supra, quoting Cyprian, said Satan disguises the Antichrist with the title of Christ. Pope Pius X in the encyclical E Supremi said that the distinguishing mark of the Antichrist is claiming to be God and taking his place. Pope Pius XI in the encyclical Divini Redemptoris compared Communism to the pseudo-messianism of the Antichrist. Pope John Paul II, in his 18 August 1985 address on his apostolic journey to Africa, said 1 John 4:3 ("Every spirit that does not acknowledge Jesus does not belong to God. This is the spirit of antichrist") evokes the danger of theology divorced from holiness and theological culture divorced from serving Christ. Pope Benedict XVI said in the Sunday Angelus of 11 March 2012 that violence is the tool of the Antichrist. In the General Audience of 12 November 2008, Benedict XVI said Christian tradition had come to identify the son of perdition as the Antichrist. Pope Francis, in his morning meditation of 2 February 2014, said that Christian faith is not an ideology, but that "the Apostle James says that ideologues of the faith are the Antichrist." In his morning meditation of 19 September 2014, Francis said the Antichrist must come before the final resurrection. In his morning meditation of 7 January 2016, he said the evil spirit spoken of in 1 John 4:6 is the Antichrist. In his morning meditation on 11 November 2016, Francis said whoever says the criteria of Christian love is not the Incarnation is the Antichrist.

==== Speculation ====
The Prophecy of the Popes (identified as a 16th-century forgery by historians) claims Rome will be destroyed during the pontificate of the last Pope, implying a connection to the Antichrist.

Fulton J. Sheen, a Catholic bishop, wrote in 1951:

The Antichrist will not be so called; otherwise he would have no followers... he will come disguised as the Great Humanitarian; he will talk peace, prosperity and plenty not as means to lead us to God, but as ends in themselves... He will tempt Christians with the same three temptations with which he tempted Christ... He will have one great secret which he will tell to no one: he will not believe in God. Because his religion will be brotherhood without the fatherhood of God, he will deceive even the elect. He will set up a counterchurch... It will have all the notes and characteristics of the Church, but in reverse and emptied of its divine content. It will be a mystical body of the Antichrist that will in all externals resemble the mystical body of Christ.

==== Catechism of the Catholic Church ====
The Catechism of the Catholic Church, which John Paul II said is a "sure norm for teaching the faith," puts the doctrine on the Antichrist under a subsection entitled "The Church's Ultimate Trial," equating it with "the supreme religious deception" and "pseudo-messianism" of human "self-glorification":

Before Christ's second coming the Church must pass through a final trial that will shake the faith of many believers. The persecution that accompanies her pilgrimage on earth will unveil the "mystery of iniquity" in the form of a religious deception offering men an apparent solution to their problems at the price of apostasy from the truth. The supreme religious deception is that of the Antichrist, a pseudo-messianism by which man glorifies himself in place of God and of his Messiah come in the flesh. (CCC 675)

The Antichrist's deception already begins to take shape in the world every time the claim is made to realize within history that messianic hope which can only be realized beyond history through the eschatological judgment. The Church has rejected even modified forms of this falsification of the kingdom to come under the name of millenarianism, especially the "intrinsically perverse" political form of a secular messianism. (CCC 676)

=== Eastern Orthodox ===
Throughout history, various ecclesiastics of the Eastern Orthodox Church have identified the office of the Roman Catholic papacy with the antichrist. Russian Orthodox Metropolitan Anthony Khrapovitsky, in explaining the necessity of rebaptism for Roman Catholics, Protestants and Nestorians, declared:

It is clear that by this regulation the Church does not recognize in heretics and schismatics either the priesthood or the other mysteries, and considers them subject to ecclesiastical baptism in the nature of things ... the Church by receiving Latins into communion in the same way as Nestorians (Council of Trullo, 95) does not make any distinction between old heresies and the Latin one. I think that the Latins are considerably further from the Church and they are worse than Monophysites and Monophelites, because they created a second Christ, i.e., the antichrist in the person of the Pope, who is supposedly infallible...

In a Christmas 2018 interview on Russian state television, Patriarch Kirill of Moscow warned that "The Antichrist is the person that will be at the head of the World Wide Web controlling all of humanity. That means that the structure itself poses a danger. There shouldn't be a single centre, at least not in the foreseeable future, if we don't want to bring on the apocalypse." He exhorted listeners not to "fall into slavery to what's in your hands"..."You should remain free inside and not fall under any addiction, not to alcohol, not to narcotics, not to gadgets."

=== Old Believers ===
After Patriarch Nikon of Moscow reformed the Russian Orthodox Church during the second half of the 17th century, a large number of Old Believers held that Peter the Great, the Tsar of the Russian Empire until his death in 1725, was the Antichrist because of his treatment of the Orthodox Church, namely subordinating the church to the state, requiring clergymen to conform to the standards of all Russian civilians (shaved beards, being fluent in French), and requiring them to pay state taxes.

There are two conceptions of the Antichrist among the Old Believers: the spiritual Antichrist and the sensual Antichrist. The sensual means a particular person who will rule at the end of times for literal 3.5 years. The priested Old believers mostly adhere to this conception. The spiritual Antichrist is said to rule in the heretical church and state as a spirit through many people – since the year 1000 in the West and since 1666 in Russia. The true priesthood is considered to be lacking in the world due to 'abomination of desolation', which is synonymous with the rule of Antichrist. Most non-priested Old believers adhere to this conception (except the so called "Chasovennye").

=== Age of Enlightenment ===
Bernard McGinn noted that complete denial of the Antichrist was rare until the Age of Enlightenment. Following frequent use of "Antichrist" laden rhetoric during religious controversies in the 17th century, the use of the concept declined during the 18th century due to the rule of enlightened absolutists, who as European rulers of the time wielded significant influence over official state churches. These efforts to cleanse Christianity of "legendary" or "folk" accretions effectively removed the Antichrist from discussion in mainstream Western churches.

=== Church of Jesus Christ of Latter-Day Saints ===
In the Church of Jesus Christ of Latter-day Saints, the "Antichrist" is anyone or anything that counterfeits the true gospel or plan of salvation and that openly or secretly is set up in opposition to Christ. The great antichrist is Lucifer, but he has many assistants both as spirit beings and as mortals." Latter-day Saints use the New Testament scriptures: 1 John 2:18, 22; 1 John 4:3–6; 2 John 1:7, and the Book of Mormon: Jacob 7:1–23, Alma 1:2–16, Alma 30:6–60, in their exegesis or interpretation of the Antichrist.

=== Seventh-day Adventists ===
Seventh-day Adventists teach that the "Little Horn Power", which (as predicted in the Book of Daniel) rose after the break-up of the Roman Empire, is the Papacy. The Western Roman Empire collapsed in the late 5th century. In 533, Justinian I, the emperor of the Eastern Roman Empire (which historians have labelled the Byzantine Empire), legally recognized the bishop (pope) of Rome as the head of all the Christian churches. Because of the Arian domination of some of the Roman Empire by barbarian tribes, the bishop of Rome could not fully exercise such authority. In 538, Belisarius, one of Justinian's generals, succeeded in withstanding a siege of the city of Rome by Arian Ostrogoth besiegers, and the bishop of Rome could begin establishing universal civil authority. So, by the military intervention of the Eastern Roman Empire, the bishop of Rome became all-powerful throughout the area of the old Roman Empire. The Ostrogoths promptly re-captured the city of Rome eight years later in 546, and again in 550.

Seventh-day Adventists understand the 1260 years as lasting AD 538 to 1798 as the (supposed) duration of the papacy's domination over Rome. This period is seen as starting from one of the defeats of the Ostrogoths by the general Belisarius and as ending with the successes of French general Napoleon Bonaparte, specifically, with the capture of Pope Pius VI by general Louis Alexandre Berthier in 1798.

Like many Reformation-era Protestant leaders, the Adventist pioneer Ellen G. White (1827–1915) spoke of the Catholic Church as a fallen church in preparation for its nefarious eschatological role as the antagonist against God's true church; she saw the pope as the Antichrist. Protestant reformers such as Martin Luther, John Knox, John Calvin, William Tyndale and others held similar beliefs about the Catholic Church and the papacy when they broke away from the Catholic Church during the Reformation.

Ellen White writes,

His word has given warning of the impending danger; let this be unheeded, and the Protestant world will learn what the purposes of Rome really are, only when it is too late to escape the snare. She is silently growing into power. Her doctrines are exerting their influence in legislative halls, in the churches, and in the hearts of men. She is piling up her lofty and massive structures in the secret recesses of which her former persecutions will be repeated. Stealthily and unsuspectedly she is strengthening her forces to further her own ends when the time shall come for her to strike. All that she desires is vantage ground, and this is already being given her. We shall soon see and shall feel what the purpose of the Roman element is. Whoever shall believe and obey the word of God will thereby incur reproach and persecution.

Seventh-day Adventists view the length of time the apostate church's unbridled power was permitted to rule as shown in Daniel 7:25: "The little horn would rule a time and times and half a time" – or 1,260 years. They regard papal rule as supreme in Europe from 538 (when the Arian Ostrogoths retreated from Rome into temporary oblivion) until 1798 (when the French general Louis-Alexandre Berthier took Pope Pius VI captive) – a period of 1,260 years – including the 67 years of the Avignon Captivity (1309–1376).

=== Other Christian interpretations ===
==== Martin Wight ====
The devout Christian and political theorist Martin Wight, writing immediately after World War II, favoured the revival of the Antichrist doctrine not as a person, but as a recurrent situation featuring "demonic concentrations of power."

==== As "man of lawlessness" ====
The Antichrist has been equated with the "man of lawlessness" or "lawless one" of 2 Thessalonians 2:3, though commentaries on the identity of the "man of lawlessness" greatly vary. The "man of lawlessness" has been identified with Caligula, Nero, and the end times Antichrist. Some scholars believe that the passage contains no genuine prediction, but represents a speculation of the apostle's own, based on contemporary ideas of the Antichrist.

==== As "being in league with other figures" ====
Several American evangelical and fundamentalist theologians, including Cyrus Scofield, have identified the Antichrist as being in league with (or the same as) several figures in the Book of Revelation including the Dragon (or Serpent), the Beast, the False Prophet, and the Whore of Babylon.

==== As Satan ====
Bernard McGinn described multiple traditions detailing the relationship between the Antichrist and Satan. In the dualist approach, Satan will become incarnate in the Antichrist, just as God became incarnate in Jesus. However, in orthodox Christian thought, this view was problematic because it was too similar to Christ's incarnation and suggested dualism. Instead, the "indwelling" view became more accepted. It stipulates that the Antichrist is a human figure inhabited by Satan, since the latter's power is not to be seen as equivalent to God's. Luca Signorelli's fresco, The Sermon and Deeds of the Antichrist, depicts the indwelling view. Satan whispers in the ear of this Christlike figure and although measurably disproportionate and problematic regarding what happened to arm of the Christlike figure, sometimes is interpreted as showing the left arm of the devil slipped through the Antichrist's garment as if he is manipulating him.

== Non-Christian views ==
=== Judaism ===
An anti-Messiah figure known as Armilus, said to be the offspring of Satan and a statue, appears in some schools of Jewish eschatology, such as the 7th century CE Sefer Zerubbabel and 11th century CE Midrash Vayosha. He is stated to be the God and Messiah of the Christians. He is described as "a monstrosity, bald-headed, with one large and one small eye, deaf in the right ear and maimed in the right arm, while the left arm is two and one-half ells long." Being considered similar to, or even identical with Gog, his believed destruction by a "Messiah ben Joseph" (Messiah, of the tribe of Joseph) symbolizes the ultimate victory of the Jewish Messiah in the Messianic Age.

=== Islam ===
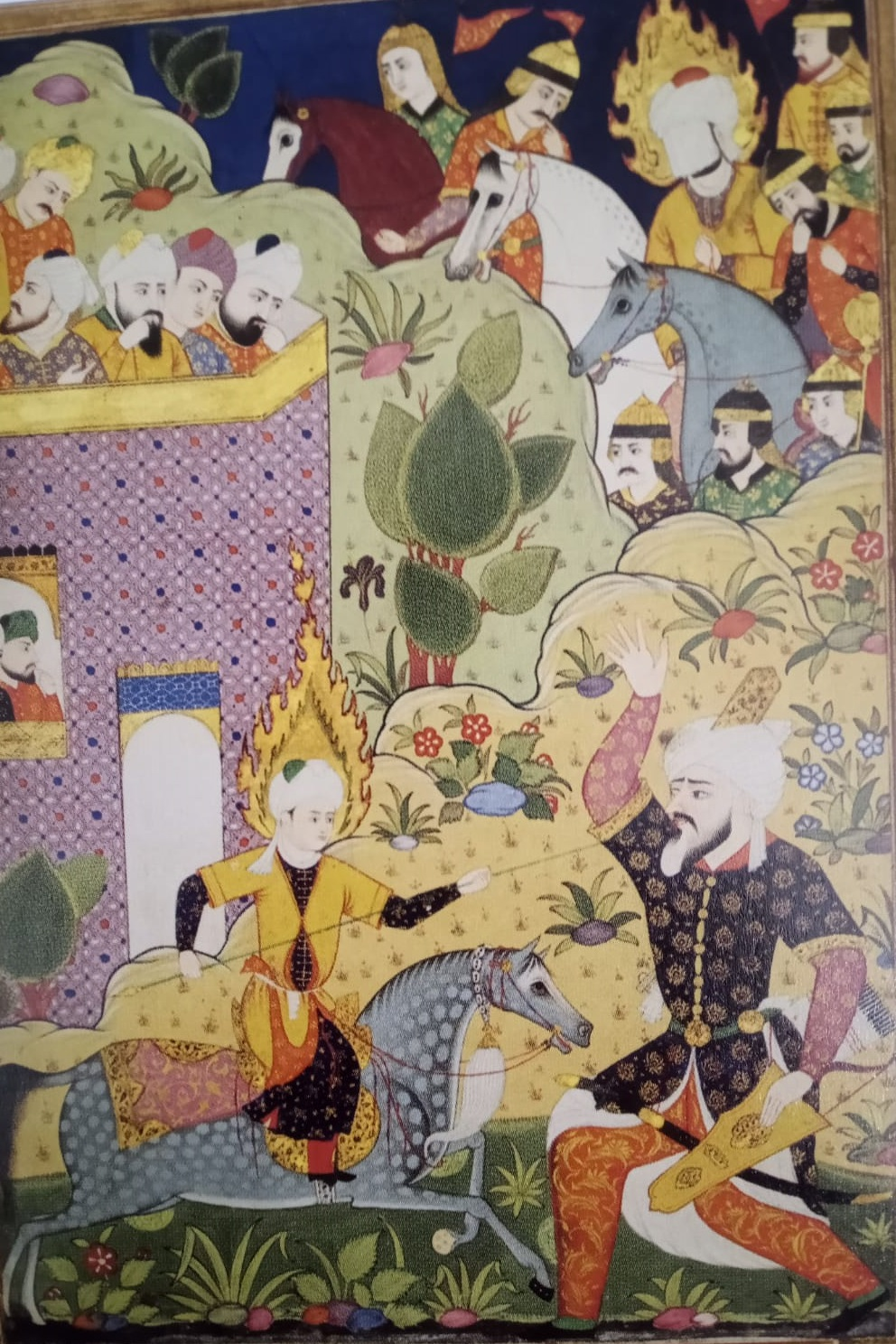
An image from a Falname made in India around 1610–1630 depicts Jesus fighting the Dajjal (right). Behind, the Mahdi with a veiled face.

An evil figure known as Al-Masih ad-Dajjal (Arabic: المسيح الدجّال, romanized: Al-Masīḥ ad-Dajjāl, lit. 'Deceitful Messiah'), appears in Islamic eschatology. The Dajjal is never mentioned in the Quran but he is mentioned and described in the ḥadīth literature. The Dajjal is described as one eyed (blind in the right eye) and the blind eye looks like a bulging out grape. Like in Christianity, the Dajjal is said to emerge out in the east, although the specific location varies among the various sources. The Dajjal will appear after the coming of the Mahdi. He will imitate the miracles performed by ʿĪsā (Jesus), such as healing the sick and raising the dead, the latter done with the aid of demons (Shayatin). It is claimed that he will deceive many people. The Mahdi according to the Islamic eschatological narrative, will appear on Earth before the Day of Judgment. At the time of the Second Coming of Christ, the prophet ʿĪsā shall return to defeat and kill al-Masih ad-Dajjal. Muslims believe that both ʿĪsā and the Mahdi will rid the world of wrongdoing, injustice, and tyranny, ensuring peace and tranquility. Eventually, the Dajjal will be killed by theʿĪsā at the gate of Lud, who upon seeing Dajjal will cause him to slowly dissolve (like salt in water). According to the Islamic eschatological narrative, the events related to the final battle before the Day of Judgment will proceed in the following order:

11 Hadith also report on the "Greater Signs" of the end, which include the appearance of the al-Masih ad-Dajjal and the reappearance of the prophet Jesus to join in battle with him at Dabbiq in Syria, as well as the arrival of the Mahdi, the "guided one." As another hadith attributed to Alī ibn Abī Talib puts it, "Most of the Dajjal's followers are Jews and children of fornication; God will kill him in Syria, at a pass called the Pass of Afiq, after three hours are gone from the day, at the hand of Jesus".

==== Ahmadiyya ====
Prophecies concerning the emergence of the Antichrist are interpreted in Ahmadiyya teachings as designating a specific group of nations centred upon a false theology (or Christology) instead of an individual, with the reference to the Antichrist as an individual indicating its unity as a class or system rather than its personal individuality. As such, Ahmadis identify the Antichrist collectively with the missionary expansion and colonial dominance of European Christianity throughout the world that was propelled by the Industrial Revolution. Mirza Ghulam Ahmad wrote extensively on this topic, identifying the Antichrist principally with colonial missionaries who, according to him, were to be countered through argumentation rather than by physical warfare and whose power and influence was to gradually disintegrate, ultimately allowing for the recognition and worship of God along Islamic ideals to prevail throughout the world in a period similar to the period of time it took for nascent Christianity to rise through the Roman Empire. The teaching that Jesus was a mortal man who survived crucifixion and died a natural death, as propounded by Ghulam Ahmad, has been seen by some scholars in this regard as a move to neutralise Christian soteriologies of Jesus and to project the superior rationality of Islam.

=== Baháʼí Faith ===
The Antichrist is considered to subvert the religion of God from the inner reality of man as 'Abdu'l-Baha narrates: "Christ was a divine Center of unity and love. Whenever discord prevails instead of unity, wherever hatred and antagonism take the place of love and spiritual fellowship, Antichrist reigns instead of Christ."

=== Scientology ===
In a document originally released only to high-ranking followers, Scientology founder L. Ron Hubbard referred to himself as the Antichrist, who would defend humanity against an alien invasion (for which he believed the Second Coming of Jesus was a metaphor). Many Scientologists who read the document for the first time found its contents highly upsetting. It was subsequently revised after Hubbard's death, with the new version lacking any references to Hubbard as the Antichrist.

== In popular culture ==
In February 1900, the Christian Russian philosopher and mystic Vladimir Solovyov published the apocalyptic A Short Tale of the Antichrist, showing his prophetic vision about the oncoming 20th century and the end of the human history.

"Antichrist" is the title of a song released by British alternative band The 1975 released in 2012 on the Facedown EP.

"Antichrist" is the title of a track by Eminem on his album The Death of Slim Shady (Coup de Grâce).

Thrash metal band Slayer has also released a song titled "The Antichrist" in 1983 on their debut album, Show No Mercy.

The character of Michael Langdon, played by actor Cody Fern, in the FX series American Horror Story: Apocalypse, is labeled as the Antichrist and brings about the end times.

== See also ==
- Armageddon
- Bible prophecy
- Christendom
- Constantine (film)
- Glossary of Christianity
- Lake of fire
- New World Order conspiracy theory
- Old Testament messianic prophecies quoted in the New Testament
- References to the Antichrist in ecclesiastical writings
- The Omen
- Two witnesses
