= References to the Antichrist in ecclesiastical writings =

The concept of the Antichrist has been a vigorous one throughout Christian history, and there are many references to it and to associated concepts both in the Bible and in subsequent ecclesiastical writings.

== New Testament ==
The words antichrist and antichrists appear four times in the First and Second Epistle of John. 1 John chapter 2 refers to many antichrists present at the time while warning of one Antichrist that is coming. The "many antichrists" belong to the same spirit as that of the one Antichrist. John wrote that such antichrists deny "that Jesus is the Christ", "the Father and the Son", and would "not confess Jesus came in the flesh."

=== Related terms ===
Many commentators, both ancient and modern, identify the Man of Sin in 2 Thessalonians chapter 2 as the Antichrist, even though they vary greatly in who they view the Antichrist to be. Paul provides greater detail than found in John's letters. He uses the term "Man of Sin" (sometimes translated son of perdition or man of lawlessness) to describe what John identifies as the Antichrist.

Paul writes that this Man of Sin will possess a number of characteristics. These include "sitting in the temple", opposing himself against anything that is worshiped, claiming divine authority, working all kinds of counterfeit miracles and signs, and doing all kinds of evil. Paul notes that "the mystery of lawlessness" (though not the Man of Sin himself) was working in secret already during his day and will continue to function until being destroyed on the Last Day. His identity is to be revealed after that which is restraining him is removed.

The term is also often applied to prophecies regarding a "Little horn" power in Daniel 7. Daniel 9:27 mentions an "abomination that causes desolations" setting itself up in a "wing" or a "pinnacle" of the temple. Some scholars interpret this as referring to the Antichrist. Some commentators also view the verses prior to this as referring to the Antichrist. Jesus references the abomination from Daniel 9:27, 11:31, and 12:11 in Matthew 24:15 and Mark 13:14 when he warns about the destruction of Jerusalem. Daniel 11:36-37 speaks of a self exalting king, considered by some to be the Antichrist.

Antiochus Epiphanes attempted to replace worship of Yahweh with veneration of himself, and was referred to in the Daniel 8:23-25 prophecy. His command to worship false gods and desecration of the temple was seen by Jerome as prefiguring the Antichrist.

Several American evangelical and fundamentalist theologians, including Cyrus Scofield, have identified the Antichrist as being in league with (or the same as) several figures in the Book of Revelation including the Dragon, the Beast, the False Prophet, and the Whore of Babylon.

== Early Church ==
Polycarp (69 – 155) warned the Philippians that everyone that preached false doctrine was an antichrist.

Irenaeus (c. 125 – c. 202) held that Rome, the fourth prophetic kingdom, would end in a tenfold partition. The ten divisions of the empire are the "ten horns" of Daniel 7 and the "ten horns" in Revelation 17. A "little horn," which is to supplant three of Rome's ten divisions, is also the still future "eighth" in Revelation.

He identified the Antichrist with Paul's Man of Sin, Daniel's Little Horn, and John's Beast of Revelation 13. He sought to apply other expressions to Antichrist, such as "the abomination of desolation," mentioned by Christ (Matt. 24:15) and the "king of a most fierce countenance," in Gabriel's explanation of the Little Horn of Daniel 8.

Under the notion that the Antichrist, as a single individual, might be of Jewish origin, he fancies that the mention of "Dan," in Jeremiah 8:16, and the omission of that name from those tribes listed in Revelation 7, might indicate Antichrist's tribe. He also speculated that it was “very probable” the Antichrist might be called Lateinos, which is Greek for “Latin Man”.

Tertullian (c.160 – c. 220) held that the Roman Empire was the restraining force written about by Paul in 2 Thessalonians 2:7-8. The fall of Rome and the disintegration of the ten provinces of the Roman Empire into ten kingdoms were to make way for the Antichrist.

'For that day shall not come, unless indeed there first come a falling away,' he [Paul] means indeed of this present empire, 'and that man of sin be revealed,' that is to say, Antichrist, 'the son of perdition, who opposeth and exalteth himself above all that is called God or religion; so that he sitteth in the temple of God, affirming that he is God. Remember ye not, that when I was with you, I used to tell you these things? And now ye know what detaineth, that he might be revealed in his time. For the mystery of iniquity doth already work; only he who now hinders must hinder, until he be taken out of the way.' What obstacles is there but the Roman state, the falling away of which, by being scattered into the ten kingdoms, shall introduce Antichrist upon (its own ruins)? And then shall be revealed the wicked one, whom the Lord shall consume with the spirit of His mouth, and shall destroy with the brightness of His coming: even him whose coming is after the working of Satan, with all power, and signs, and lying wonders, and with all deceivableness of unrighteousness in them that perish.'

Hippolytus of Rome (c. 170 – c. 236) held that the Antichrist would come from the tribe of Dan and would rebuild the Jewish temple in order to reign from it. He identified the Antichrist with the Beast out of the Earth from the book of Revelation.

By the beast, then, coming up out of the earth, he means the kingdom of Antichrist; and by the two horns he means him and the false prophet after him. And in speaking of “the horns being like a lamb,” he means that he will make himself like the Son of God, and set himself forward as king. And the terms, “he spake like a dragon,” mean that he is a deceiver, and not truthful.

Origen (185–254) refuted Celsus's view of the Antichrist. Origen utilized Scriptural citations from Daniel, Paul, and the Gospels. He argued:

Where is the absurdity, then, in holding that there exist among men, so to speak, two extremes-- the one of virtue, and the other of its opposite; so that the perfection of virtue dwells in the man who realizes the ideal given in Jesus, from whom there flowed to the human race so great a conversion, and healing, and amelioration, while the opposite extreme is in the man who embodies the notion of him that is named Antichrist?... one of these extremes, and the best of the two, should be styled the Son of God, on account of His pre-eminence; and the other, who is diametrically opposite, be termed the son of the wicked demon, and of Satan, and of the devil. And, in the next place, since evil is specially characterized by its diffusion, and attains its greatest height when it simulates the appearance of the good, for that reason are signs, and marvels, and lying miracles found to accompany evil, through the cooperation of its father the devil.

== Post-Nicene Christianity ==
Athanasius (c. 293 – 373), writes that Arius of Alexandria is to be associated with the Antichrist, saying, “And ever since [the Council of Nicaea] has Arius's error been reckoned for a heresy more than ordinary, being known as Christ's foe, and harbinger of Antichrist.”

John Chrysostom (c. 347–407) warned against speculations and old wives' tales about the Antichrist, saying, “Let us not therefore enquire into these things”. He preached that by knowing Paul's description of the Antichrist in 2 Thessalonians Christians would avoid deception.

Jerome (c. 347–420) warned that those substituting false interpretations for the actual meaning of Scripture belonged to the “synagogue of the Antichrist”. “He that is not of Christ is of Antichrist,” he wrote to Pope Damasus I. He believed that “the mystery of iniquity” written about by Paul in 2 Thessalonians 2:7 was already in action when “every one chatters about his views.” To Jerome, the power restraining this mystery of iniquity was the Roman Empire, but as it fell this restraining force was removed. He warned a noble woman of Gaul:

“He that letteth is taken out of the way, and yet we do not realize that Antichrist is near. Yes, Antichrist is near whom the Lord Jesus Christ “shall consume with the spirit of his mouth.” “Woe unto them,” he cries, “that are with child, and to them that give suck in those days.”... Savage tribes in countless numbers have overrun run all parts of Gaul. The whole country between the Alps and the Pyrenees, between the Rhine and the Ocean, has been laid waste by hordes of Quadi, Vandals, Sarmatians, Alans, Gepids, Herules, Saxons, Burgundians, Allemanni, and—alas! for the commonweal!–even Pannonians.

In his Commentary on Daniel, he noted, “Let us not follow the opinion of some commentators and suppose him to be either the Devil or some demon, but rather, one of the human race, in whom Satan will wholly take up his residence in bodily form.” Instead of rebuilding the Jewish Temple to reign from, Jerome thought the Antichrist sat in God's Temple inasmuch as he made “himself out to be like God.” He refuted Porphyry's idea that the “little horn” mentioned in Daniel chapter 7 was Antiochus Epiphanes by noting that the “little horn” is defeated by an eternal, universal ruler, right before the final judgment. Instead, he advocated that the “little horn” was the Antichrist:

We should therefore concur with the traditional interpretation of all the commentators of the Christian Church, that at the end of the world, when the Roman Empire is to be destroyed, there shall be ten kings who will partition the Roman world amongst themselves. Then an insignificant eleventh king will arise, who will overcome three of the ten kings... after they have been slain, the seven other kings also will bow their necks to the victor.

Circa 380, an apocalyptic pseudo-prophecy falsely attributed to the Tiburtine Sibyl describes Constantine as victorious over Gog and Magog. Later on, it predicts:

When the Roman empire shall have ceased, then the Antichrist will be openly revealed and will sit in the House of the Lord in Jerusalem. While he is reigning, two very famous men, Elijah and Enoch, will go forth to announce the coming of the Lord. Antichrist will kill them and after three days they will be raised up by the Lord. Then there will be a great persecution, such as has not been before nor shall be thereafter. The Lord will shorten those days for the sake of the elect, and the Antichrist will be slain by the power of God through Michael the Archangel on the Mount of Olives.

Augustine of Hippo (354 – 430) wrote “it is uncertain in what temple [the Antichrist] shall sit, whether in that ruin of the temple which was built by Solomon, or in the Church.”

Arnulf (bishop of Orléans) accused Pope John XV in A.D. 991:

Are any bold enough to maintain that the priests of the Lord all over the world are to take their law from monsters of guilt like these—men branded with ignominy, illiterate men, and ignorant alike of things human and divine? If, holy fathers, we are bound to weigh in the balance the lives, the morals, and the attainments of the humblest candidate for the priestly office, how much more ought we to look to the fitness of him who aspires to be the Lord and Master of all priests! Yet how would it fare with us, if it should happen that the man the most deficient in all these virtues, unworthy of the lowest place in the priesthood, should be chosen to fill the highest place of all? What would you say of such a one, when you see him sitting upon the throne glittering in purple and gold? Must he not be the "Antichrist, sitting in the temple of God and showing himself as God"?

=== Pre-Reformation Western Christianity ===
Pope Gregory VII (c. 1015 – 1085), struggled against, in his own words, "a robber of temples, a perjurer against the Holy Roman Church, notorious throughout the whole Roman world for the basest of crimes, namely, Wilbert, plunderer of the holy church of Ravenna, Antichrist, and archeritic."

Cardinal Benno, on the opposite side of the Investiture Controversy, wrote long descriptions of abuses committed by Gregory VII, including necromancy, torture of a former friend upon a bed of nails, commissioning an attempted assassination, executions without trials, unjust excommunication, doubting the Real Presence in the Eucharist, and even burning it. Benno held that Gregory VII was “either a member of Antichrist, or Antichrist himself.”

Eberhard II von Truchsees, Prince-Archbishop of Salzburg in 1241 at the Council of Regensburg denounced Pope Gregory IX as "that man of perdition, whom they call Antichrist, who in his extravagant boasting says, I am God, I cannot err." He argued that the ten kingdoms that the Antichrist is involved with were the "Turks, Greeks, Egyptians, Africans, Spaniards, French, English, Germans, Sicilians, and Italians who now occupy the provinces of Rome." He held that the papacy was the "little horn" of Daniel 7:8:

A little horn has grown up with eyes and mouth speaking great things, which is reducing three of these kingdoms--i.e. Sicily, Italy, and Germany--to subserviency, is persecuting the people of Christ and the saints of God with intolerable opposition, is confounding things human and divine, and is attempting things unutterable, execrable.

== Protestant reformers ==
Many Protestant reformers, including Martin Luther, John Calvin, Thomas Cranmer, John Knox, and Cotton Mather, identified the Roman Papacy as the Antichrist. The Centuriators of Magdeburg, a group of Lutheran scholars in Magdeburg headed by Matthias Flacius, wrote the 12-volume "Magdeburg Centuries" to discredit the papacy and identify the pope as the Antichrist. The fifth round of talks in the Lutheran-Roman Catholic dialogue notes,

In calling the pope the "antichrist," the early Lutherans stood in a tradition that reached back into the eleventh century. Not only dissidents and heretics but even saints had called the bishop of Rome the "antichrist" when they wished to castigate his abuse of power.

William Tyndale, an English reformer, held that while the Roman Catholic Empire of that age was the empire of Antichrist, any religious organization that distorted the doctrine of the Old and New Testaments showed the work of Antichrist. In his treatise The Parable of the Wicked Mammon, he expressly rejected the established Church teaching that looked to the future for an Antichrist to rise up, and he taught that Antichrist is a present spiritual force that will be with us until the end of the age under different religious disguises from time to time. Tyndale's translation of 2 Thessalonians, chapter 2, concerning the "man of sin" reflected his understanding, but was significantly amended by later revisers, including the King James Bible committee.

== Counter-Reformation ==
The view of Futurism, a product of the Counter-Reformation, was advanced beginning in the 16th century in response to the identification of the Papacy as Antichrist. Francisco Ribera, a Jesuit priest, developed this theory in In Sacram Beati Ioannis Apostoli & Evangelistae Apocalypsin Commentarij, his 1585 treatise on the Apocalypse of John. St. Bellarmine codified this view, giving in full the Catholic theory set forth by the Greek and Latin Fathers, of a personal Antichrist to come just before the end of the world and to be accepted by the Jews and enthroned in the temple at Jerusalem. Most premillennial dispensationalists now accept Bellarmine's interpretation in modified form. Widespread US Protestant identification of the Papacy as the Antichrist persisted until the early 1900s when the Scofield Reference Bible was published by Cyrus Scofield. This commentary promoted Futurism, causing a decline in the Protestant identification of the Papacy as Antichrist.

Some Futurists hold that sometime prior to the expected return of Jesus, there will be a period of "great tribulation" during which the Antichrist, indwelt and controlled by Satan, will attempt to win supporters with false peace, supernatural signs. He will silence all that defy him by refusing to "receive his mark" on their right hands or forehead. This "mark" will be required to legally partake in the end-time economic system. Some Futurists believe that the Antichrist will be assassinated halfway through the Tribulation, being revived and indwelt by Satan. The Antichrist will continue on for three and a half years following this "deadly wound".

== See also ==
- Armilus
- Beelzebub
- Bible Prophecy
- Christ
- False messiah
- List of fictional Antichrists
- Mahdi
- Masih ad-Dajjal
- Summary of Christian eschatological differences
- Temple Mount
- Third Temple
