= Great Apostasy =

Concept in some Christian churches

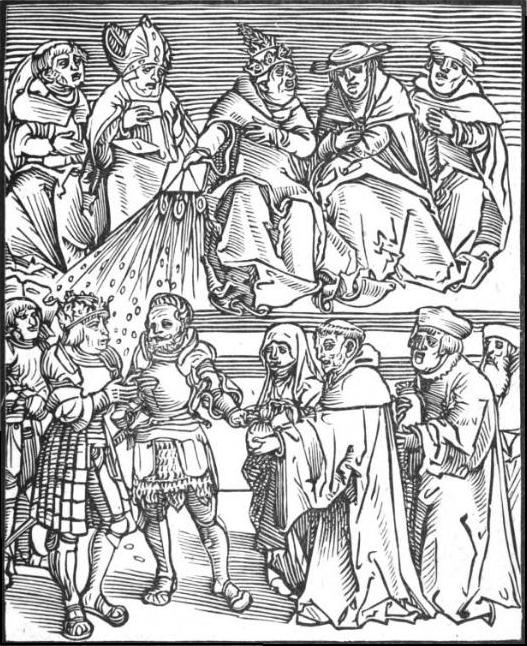
Antichristus, a woodcut by Lucas Cranach the Elder: the pope depicted as the Antichrist, using his temporal power to grant authority to a generously contributing ruler.

In Christianity, the Great Apostasy is the notion that mainstream Christian Churches have fallen away from the faith founded by Jesus and promulgated through his Twelve Apostles.

A belief in a Great Apostasy has been characteristic of the Restorationist tradition of Christianity, which includes unrelated groups emerging after the Second Great Awakening, such as the Christadelphians, Swedenborgians, Non-Denominational, Latter Day Saints, Jehovah's Witnesses, Oneness Pentecostals, and Iglesia ni Cristo. These groups hold that traditional Christianity, represented by Catholicism, Protestantism and Orthodoxy, has fallen into error and thus, the true faith needs to be restored.

The term has been used to describe the perceived fallen state of traditional Christianity, especially the Catholic Church, sometimes claiming that it changed the doctrines of the early church and allowed traditional Greco-Roman culture (i.e., Greco-Roman mysteries, deities of solar monism such as Mithras and Sol Invictus, pagan festivals and Mithraic sun worship and idol worship) into the Church on its own perception of authority. Because it made these changes using claims of tradition and not from scripture, the Church – in the opinion of those adhering to this concept – has fallen into apostasy. A major thread of this perception is the suggestion that, to attract and convert people to Christianity, the Church in Rome incorporated pagan beliefs and practices within the Christian religion, mostly Graeco-Roman rituals, mysteries, and festivals.

The term is derived from the Second Epistle to the Thessalonians, in which the Apostle Paul (or someone writing as Paul) informs the Christians of Thessalonica that a great apostasy must occur before the return of Christ, when "the man of sin is revealed, the son of destruction" (chapter 2:1–12). The Catholic Church, Eastern and Oriental Orthodox Churches, as well as Dispensationalists, have interpreted this chapter as referring to a future falling-away, during the reign of the Antichrist at the end of time.

== Overview ==
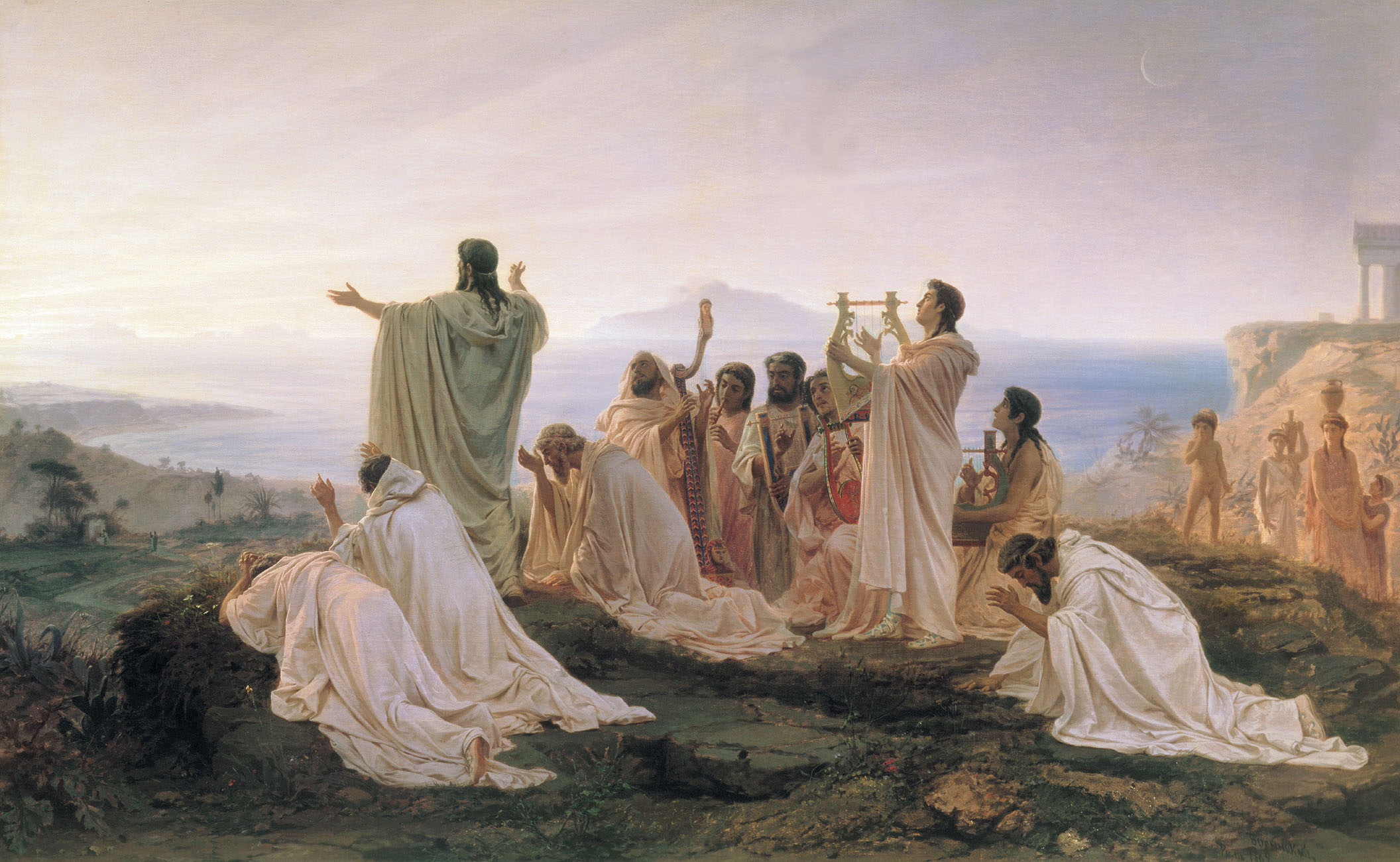
Pythagoreans celebrate sunrise.

Some modern scholars believe that the Christian Church in the early stages picked up pagan oral teachings from Jewish and Hellenistic sources, which formed the basis of a secret oral tradition, which in the 4th century came to be called the disciplina arcani. Mainstream theologians believe it contained liturgical details and certain other pagan traditions which remain a part of some branches of mainstream Christianity (for example, some Catholic theologians thought that the doctrine of transubstantiation was a part of this). Important esoteric influences on the church were the Christian theologians Clement of Alexandria and Origen, the main figures of the Catechetical School of Alexandria.

Restorationists teach that the Papacy slowly became corrupted as it strove to attain great dominion and authority, both civil and ecclesiastical. For example, they say, it reinstated the pagan ceremonies and obligations of the Collegium Pontificum and the position of Pontifex Maximus and created Christian religious orders to replace the ancient Roman ones such as the Vestal Virgins and the flamines. It brought into the church the ancient pagan festivals and made them 'Holy Days'. Catholics as well as the Reformers pointed to the office of the Papacy as responsible for the fallen state of the church as they considered the conduct of those in power had grown so spiritually or morally corrupt that it was called the Antichrist power by those within as well as outside of the church.

== Protestant views ==
Reformers like Martin Luther, John Calvin and others disagreed with the papacy's claim of temporal power over all secular governments and the autocratic character of the papal office, and challenged papal authority as a corruption from the early church and questioned the Catholic Church's ability to define Christian practice.

=== Reformed perspective ===
The defenses of the right belief and worship of the church resided in the bishops, and Protestants theorize that the process of unifying the doctrine of the church also concentrated power into their own hands (see also Ignatius of Antioch, who advocated a powerful bishop), and made their office an instrument of power coveted by ambitious men. They charge that, through ambition and jealousy, the church has been at times, and not very subtly, subverted from carrying out its sacred aim. For the Reformers, the culmination of this gradual corruption was typified, in a concentrated way, in the office of the pope who took on ancient titles such as Pontifex Maximus and supreme power in the church.

Calvin, Luther, and multiple later churches and preachers have held that Scripture points out the Catholic Church as the fallen church of biblical prophecy.

Martin Luther believed and taught that the church had strayed and fallen away from the true teachings of the scripture. He challenged the authority of the pope of the Roman Catholic Church by teaching that the Bible is the only source of divinely revealed knowledge, and opposed sacerdotalism by considering all baptized Christians to be a holy priesthood.

Although Lutherans and Calvinists hold that the Ecumenical Councils of the early and medieval church are true expressions of the Christian faith, some assert the councils are at times inconsistent with one another, and err on particular points. The true church, they argue, will be mixed with alien influences and false beliefs, which is necessary in order for these impurities ultimately to be overcome and the truth to be vindicated.

The Westminster Confession of Faith (Calvinist), states:

The purest churches under heaven are subject both to mixture and error; and some have so degenerated as to become no churches of Christ, but synagogues of Satan. Nevertheless, there shall be always a church on earth, to worship God according to his will.

=== Dispensationalist perspective ===
The Historicist biblical interpretation was the viewpoint of most major Protestant Reformers, beginning with the accusations of Martin Luther. Refuting these claims was accordingly a major objective of the Counter-Reformation, both in the Catholic Church's initial response to Luther and especially in the aftermath of the Council of Trent. This required a renewed effort to interpret the relevant scriptural passages in light of the arguments put forth by the early Protestants. Two particularly noteworthy theories were proposed during the Counter-Reformation to address the historicist claim that the Antichrist was actually the Roman Catholic church.

Francisco Ribera and Luis de Alcazar, both 16th-century Spanish Jesuits, rose to meet the challenge by introducing counter-interpretations of the prophecies in Daniel and Revelation. Their approaches became known as the Preterist and Futurist schools, and both theologies quickly gained traction throughout Catholic Europe.

Gradually, Preterism and Futurism gained currency even in Protestant thought. Few mainstream Protestant leaders today still employ the vocabulary of "apostasy" and "anti-Christ" when discussing the papacy, although some conservative Evangelical and fundamentalist churches still accept these teachings to varying degrees.

The spread of dispensationalist doctrine has led multiple conservative Protestants to drop the traditional interpretation of the Book of Revelation as prediction of events that have taken place throughout history (historicism) and shifted it to future events (futurism), eliminating any relation between the prophecies and the Catholic Church. This has resulted in a re-interpretation of the end times. Although Protestant fundamentalists still largely object to Catholic doctrine concerning the papacy, most have dropped the harsher Reformation view and no longer identify the pope as the Antichrist.

== Restorationist perspective ==
=== Church of Jesus Christ of Latter-day Saints ===
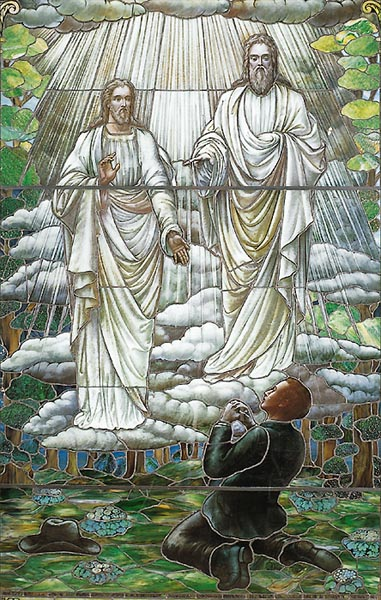
LDS Church members believe that Joseph Smith was called by God to restore the true teachings of Jesus Christ.

According to the Church of Jesus Christ of Latter-day Saints (LDS Church), the Great Apostasy started not long after the ascension of Jesus and continued until Joseph Smith's First Vision in 1820. To LDS Church members, or Latter-day Saints, the Great Apostasy is marked by:

- the difficulty of the Apostles to keep early Christians from distorting the teachings of Jesus and to prevent the followers from dividing into different ideological groups;
- the persecution and martyrdom of the church's Apostles;
- the loss of leaders with priesthood authority to administer the church and its ordinances;
- the lack of continuous revelation to instruct the leaders and guide the church; and
- the corruption of Christian doctrine by Greek or other allegedly pagan philosophies such as Neo-Platonism, Platonic realism, Aristotelianism and Asceticism.

Beginning in the 1st century and continuing up to the 4th century AD, some emperors of the Roman Empire carried out violent persecutions against early Christians.

The LDS Church believes that all priesthood leaders with authority to conduct and perpetuate church affairs were either martyred, taken from the earth, or began to teach impure doctrines, causing a break in the necessary apostolic succession. It is a belief that what survived was a portion of the light and truth that Jesus had established: the Church of Jesus Christ, as established by him, was no longer to be found on the earth. Survivors of the persecutions were overly-influenced by various pagan philosophies either because they were not well indoctrinated in Jesus' teachings or they corrupted their Christian beliefs (willingly, by compulsion, or with good intentions but without direct revelation from God to help them interpret said beliefs) by accepting non-Christian doctrines into their faith. LDS Church doctrine is that multiple plain and simple truths of the gospel of Christ were, therefore, lost.

The LDS Church and its members understand various writings in the New Testament to be an indication that even soon after the ascension of Jesus the Apostles struggled to keep early Christians from distorting the teachings of Jesus and to prevent the followers from dividing into different ideological groups. The doctrine highlights statements from the Scriptures that various Old Testament and New Testament scriptures, like 2 Thessalonians 2:3, that Jesus Christ prophesied this "falling away" or "apostasy." The Christian believers who survived the persecutions took it upon themselves to speak for God, interpret, amend or add to his doctrines and ordinances, and carry out his work without proper authority and divine direction from God. During this time, important doctrines and rites were lost or corrupted. The doctrine of the Trinity adopted at the Council of Nicaea is an example shown of how pagan philosophy corrupted the teachings of Jesus. The LDS Church believes that Joseph Smith's visions and revelations taught an important and sacrosanct doctrine that God, the Eternal Father, His Son, Jesus Christ, and the Holy Ghost are not one substance, but three separate and distinct beings forming one Godhead. Latter-day Saints reject the early ecumenical councils for what they see as misguided human attempts without divine assistance to decide matters of doctrine, substituting debate or politics for divine revelation. The LDS Church teaches that the often heated proceedings of such councils were evidence that the church was no longer led by revelation and divine authority. Indeed, the normative Christian view is that public revelation, or revelation that is binding on all Christians, concluded with the death of the last Apostle.

As a result, LDS Church members refer to the "restitution of all things" mentioned in Acts 3:20–21 and believe that a restoration of all the original and primary doctrines and rites of Christianity was necessary. Church members believe that God the Father and His Son, Jesus Christ, appeared to Smith, then a 14-year-old boy, and called him to be a prophet. Later Peter, James, and John, three of Christ's apostles in the New Testament, appeared from heaven to Smith and ordained him an apostle. Through Christ's priesthood authority and divine direction, church members believe that Smith was called and ordained to re-establish Christ's church. Hence, members of the faith refer to their church as "The Church of Jesus Christ," a name which they believe to have been revealed to Smith after the church's founding on 6 April 1830, originally called the Church of Christ. Latter-day Saints is a term members believe refers to members of Christ's church who were originally called "saints" and that the LDS Church is Christ's restored church in these days, believed by a number of Christian denominations to be the last days prior to the prophesied second coming of Jesus.

=== Adventists ===
Ellen White wrote:

His word has given warning of the impending danger; let this be unheeded, and the Protestant world will learn what the purposes of Rome really are, only when it is too late to escape the snare. She is silently growing into power. Her doctrines are exerting their influence in legislative halls, in the churches, and in the hearts of men. She is piling up her lofty and massive structures in the secret recesses of which her former persecutions will be repeated. Stealthily and unsuspectedly she is strengthening her forces to further her own ends when the time shall come for her to strike. All that she desires is vantage ground, and this is already being given her. We shall soon see and shall feel what the purpose of the Roman element is. Whoever shall believe and obey the word of God will thereby incur reproach and persecution.

— Ellen G. White, The Great Controversy: Between Christ and Satan, page 581

Seventh-day Adventists believe that the mark of the Beast refers to the apostate church which in the end times will legally enforce Sunday-worship. "Those who reject God's memorial of creatorship – the Bible Sabbath – choosing to worship and honor Sunday in the full knowledge that it is not God's appointed day of worship, will receive the 'mark of the beast.'" "Sunday Sabbath is purely a child of the Papacy. It is the mark of the beast." They see an apostate church that changed God's law, preferred pagan traditions, allowed pagan beliefs and ceremonies into the church, and brought oppression against and persecuted the true believers throughout the Dark Ages for 1260 years as prophesied in Revelation 12:6, 14–16.

=== Hyperdispensationalism ===
Hyperdispensationalism is a niche view in Protestantism which views Pauline Christianity or the beliefs and doctrines espoused by the apostle Paul through his writings as the purest form of Christian faith and worship from which the church fell away. E. W. Bullinger framed the position for early apostasy thus:

We are told, on every hand, today, that we must go back to the first three centuries to find the purity of faith and worship of the primitive church! But it is clear from this comparison of Acts xix.10 and 2 Tim.i.15, that we cannot go back ... even to the apostle's own life-time! ... It was Pauline truth and teaching from which all had "turned away".

— Juanita Carey, E. W. Bullinger: A Biography, page 148, quoting from Bullinger's "The Church Epistles"

== Responses of Catholicism, Lutheranism ==
Regarding "forbidding to marry" and the "commanding to abstain from meats" in 1 Timothy 4 (Paul might have spoken in general in regard to any new sects or doctrines which could arise), the Catholic Church responds:

Regarding the Church's discipline of celibacy, men and women freely abstain from the high and holy good of marriage so that they can more fully give themselves to God and His work. Marriage is not "forbidden". Neither is it considered evil. See the Catechism of the Catholic Church (Catechism), numbers 1618–20, especially the quote from St. John Chrysostom. 1 Timothy 4:1–5 needs to be read in context. There were those in Paul's time that forbade marriage on heretical presuppositions that marriage was intrinsically evil, a teaching based in turn on the false belief that the body or all matter was evil, and only the Spirit was good. This Gnostic heresy became prevalent again in the second century. The heresy became manifest in later centuries as well, with groups like the Albigensians, who also fell away from the Catholic Faith. ... With regard to foods, none are forbidden to Catholics. Unlike vegetarians, we may eat meat; unlike Jews and Muslims, we may eat pork, shellfish, and other non-kosher foods. Fasting – a practice actively promoted in Scripture – and abstinence from certain foods at particular times are good spiritual disciplines, but there is no food from which Catholics must abstain at all times. ... So who is Paul condemning regarding abstinence? He is referring to Gnostics and their spiritual descendants. In ascetic Gnosticism, we find both practices Paul condemned in his First Letter to Timothy. Ascetic Gnostics categorically forbade marriage (which libertine Gnostics also did) and abstained from sexual intercourse and meat all the time.

— Doesn't St. Paul Condemn Celibacy, Fasting, and Abstaining From Meat?

Martin Luther, who spearheaded the Reformation, sought to reform the Catholic Church, as opposed to restoring it. The Lutheran Church traditionally sees itself as the "main trunk of the historical Christian Tree" founded by Christ and the Apostles, holding that during the Reformation, the Church of Rome fell away. As such, the Augsburg Confession, the Lutheran confession of faith, teaches that "the faith as confessed by Luther and his followers is nothing new, but the true catholic faith, and that their churches represent the true catholic or universal church". When the Lutherans presented the Augsburg Confession to Charles V, Holy Roman Emperor, they explained "that each article of faith and practice was true first of all to Holy Scripture, and then also to the teaching of the church fathers and the councils".

== See also ==
- Antinomianism
- Bible prophecy
- Caesaropapism
- Constantinian shift
- Criticism of the Roman Catholic Church
- Mormonism and Christianity
- References to the Antichrist in ecclesiastical writings
- Sacralism
- Summary of Christian eschatological differences
- Total depravity
