= Thomas Swinnerton =

Thomas Swinnerton (or Swynnerton; died 1554) was an evangelical preacher and author during the English Reformation.

Swinnerton was one of the first Englishmen to study at Wittenberg University when he enrolled there in 1526. Later sources claim that he studied at Oxford or Cambridge, but this is unlikely and his contemporary, Bishop John Longland of Lincoln claimed in 1536 that he never attended an English university. By 1531, Swinnerton was back in England, where he was accused of abducting one Eleanor Wakefield, the servant of a wealthy London merchant. According to his own account, he was merely staying with the girl in the house of her uncle, William Wakefield, in Yorkshire. To avoid prosecution, Swinnerton adopted the alias Thomas Roberts and perhaps also John Roberts, as claimed by Bishop John Bale of Ossory, who claimed he was being persecuted by the Catholic lord chancellor, Thomas More.

In 1534, in defence of the Act of Supremacy, which broke the English church from Rome, he published two books attacking the Papacy for corruption and for sowing division both within the church and within Europe. Neither was published under his name: A litel treatise ageynste the mutterynge of some papistis in corners was anonymous and A mustre of scismatyke bysshoppes of Rome was released under his alias Thomas Roberts. The former is "dull [and] brief". He defends the Act of Supremacy by crediting King Henry VIII and his counsellors for having discovered Papal corruption and broken with Rome out of concern for the spiritual welfare of the people. He was influenced by William Tyndale's Obedience of a Christian Man (1528), despite Tyndale's scepticism of the king's motives. In labelling Papal discourse as the "mutterings of some papists in corners", Swinnerton discredits all speech or writing that lacks royal approval and takes place, so to speak, "in blind alleys". His Mustre, a "far superior" work to the Litel treatise, is a preface to his translation of the Gesta Romanae ecclesiae contra Hildebrandum of Cardinal Beno of Santi Martino e Silvestro. Beno was one of the cardinals who abandoned Pope Gregory VII in 1084 in favour of the Antipope Clement III. Swinnerton provides a list of antipopes with commentary intended to refute the doctrine of Papal infallibility.

In 1535, Archbishop Thomas Cranmer of Canterbury, under the Ecclesiastical Licences Act 1533, granted Swinnerton a licence to preach anywhere in the kingdom, probably in the expectation that he would promote the royal supremacy he had so ardently defended in print. That same year he attempted unsuccessfully to convert the monks of the London Charterhouse to the Reformation. Between 1535 and 1537 he travelled throughout England spreading evangelical teachings and attacking the Papacy. Conservatives within the church of England, who opposed the doctrines of evangelicalism, raised opposition to his mission in Bedfordshire and Rye, and Bishop Longland complained to Thomas Cromwell, the king's principal secretary, but to no avail.

Around 1537 Swinnerton composed a work entitled Tropes and figures of scripture and dedicated it to Cromwell. In it he combined Renaissance humanism and rhetoric with an evangelical application of Scripture to topics like purgatory and monasticism. This humanistic Protestantism is reminiscent of that which took shape around Martin Luther at Wittenberg, but in theological specifics there is evidence that he was being influenced by Swiss Protestantism and the Institutes of the Christian Religion of John Calvin, published in 1536. Although intended for publication, Tropes and figures was never printed and survived only in manuscript form until edited by Richard Rex and published in 1999.

Sometime before 1537 Swinnerton received a curacy in the parish of St Mary Elms in Ipswich. He remained there until 1541, having a distinct evangelical effect on the parish. In 1538, the will of the wealthy local merchant Robert Cutler commissioned him to preach three sermons in place of masses in memory of the deceased. He was at some point accused before Bishop William Rugg of Norwich of having a wife in Colchester, perhaps the Eleanor Wakefield he had allegedly "abducted" or merely "stayed with" in 1531. Summoned before the diocesan consistory to answer the charge, he never appeared, perhaps through the intervention of Cromwell, who appears to have protected him from Bishop Longland a couple years earlier. In 1541 he was transferred to the vicarage of St Clement's in Sandwich as part of the archbishop of Canterbury's effort to evangelise Kent for the Reformation. In St Clement's, he was presented by the archbishop's nephew, Edmund Cranmer. If indeed he was married to Eleanor Wakefield, whose father was the archbishop's chaplain, it would appear that Swinnerton enjoyed the protection of two of the most powerful men in England: Cranmer and Cromwell.

In 1553, when the Catholic Mary I ascended the throne, he left Kent and went into exile at Emden in Germany. There he died the following year.

== Bibliography ==
- A litel treatise ageynste the mutterynge of some papistis in corners (London: Thomas Berthelet, 1534)
- A mustre of scismatyke bysshoppes of Rome (London: Wynkyn de Worde, 1534[?])
- Tropes and figures of Scripture (1537[?])
