= Tomaso Malvenda =

Spanish theologian (1566–1628)

Tomaso Malvenda

Tomaso Malvenda (1566 – 7 May 1628) was a Spanish Dominican exegete and historical critic.

== Life ==
Malvenda was born in Xàtiva, Valencia. He entered the Dominicans in his youth; at the age of thirty-five, he seems to have already taught philosophy and theology. His criticisms on the Annales Ecclesiastici of Baronius, embodied in a letter to the letter to the author (1600), showed ability, and Baronius used his influence to have Malvenda summoned to Rome. Here, he was an adviser to the cardinal, while also employed in revising the Dominican Breviary, annotating Brasichelli's Index Expurgatorius, and writing some annals of the order (they were published against his wishes and without his revision). To this period also belong his "Antichristo libri XI" (Rome, 1604), and "De paradiso voluptatis" (Rome, 1605).

Returning to Spain in 1608, Malvenda undertook a new version of the Old Testament in Latin, with commentaries. This he had carried as far as Ezechiel, xvi, 16, when he died. It gives a rendering into Latin of every word in the original; but many of the Latin words employed are intelligible only through equivalents supplied in the margin. The work was published at Lyon in 1650 as "Commentaria in S. Scripturam, una cum nova de verbo in verbum ex hebraeo translatione" etc.
