= Arnulf (bishop of Orléans) =

French bishop of Orléans (died 1003)

Arnulf (died 1003) was the bishop of Orléans from 970 until his death. He is known for his feud with Abbo of Fleury, and his denunciation of the papacy.

Arnulf was the nephew of Ermentheus, the previous bishop, succeeding to the see on his death in 970. He was known as a strong supporter of Hugh Capet, who took over as ruler of West Francia. Abbo, who became abbot of Fleury in 988, offended Arnulf by his vigorous advocacy of the rights of monasteries. Their power struggle is documented from Abbo's side in his works. Arnulf's only surviving work, De cartillagine (On cartilage), is a response to Abbo's Apologeticus and was written in the aftermath of a riot that broke up the council of Saint-Denis in 993.

At the Synod of Saint-Basle de Verzy in 991 Arnulf resisted papal interference, with very aggressive rhetoric. His speech there, O lugenda Roma, was passed down in a text composed by Gerbert d'Aurillac, who became Pope Sylvester II at the end of the decade. Gerbert's version took remarks by Arnulf, and put them into connected form. It also emphasised the attack on the pope of the time, John XV, over the destructive remarks about the institution of the papacy. The business of the meeting was to deal with Arnulf, Archbishop of Reims, as a rebel, part of the aftermath of Hugh Capet's assumption of power from the Carolingians. The speech attributed to Arnulf as prolocutor, and in particular his characterisation of the Pope as Antichrist, was quoted subsequently, for example, by the Magdeburg Centuriators and by James I of England.
