= Beno of Santi Martino e Silvestro =

Beno or Benno (fl. 1082–1098), also known as Bruno, was an imperialist Roman Catholic cardinal and priest of Santi Silvestro e Martino ai Monte during the Investiture Controversy. He was one of the bishops who abandoned Pope Gregory VII (Hildebrand) in 1084 and consecrated Antipope Clement III, the candidate of Emperor Henry IV, in Rome. He wrote the Gesta Romanae ecclesiae contra Hildebrandum, an account of the alleged misdeeds of Gregory.

Nothing is known of his date or place of birth, but since the time of Onofrio Panvinio in the 16th century, he has been regarded as a German. He may have been from Lorraine. In his writings, he praises Duke Godfrey III of Lower Lorraine and according to Alfonso Chacón, also writing in the 16th century, Pope Stephen IX, who was Godfrey's brother, appointed him cardinal of Santa Sabina. In fact all that is known with certainty is that he was the cardinal-priest of Santi Silvestro e Martino before the pontificate of Gregory VII.

On 4 May 1082, Beno participated in a meeting of cardinals that found it was illegal to use church property in the fight against the antipope, declaring that "the sacred things of the church are by no means to be expended on a secular army" (Note: sacras res ecclesiarum nullatenus in militia saeculari expendendas) but are to be reserved for charitable use. Since earlier that year Pope Gregory had used the property of the church of Canossa against the antipope, the cardinals decision must be regarded as a direct rebuke of the pontiff. Most of these cardinals, including Beno, abandoned the pope two years later. In 1084, when the emperor came to Rome to have Clement enthroned in the Lateran thirteen cardinals, all deacons or priests, agreed to declare Gregory deposed and confirm the election of Clement. On 4 November, Beno and eleven other cardinals (including two bishops recently created by Clement) witnessed Clement grant a privilege to the church of San Marcello al Corso.

Prior to the 19th century, the Gesta Romanae ecclesiae contra Hildebrandum ("Deeds of the Roman Church Against Hildebrand") was widely printed under the misnomer Vita et gesta Hildebrandi ("Life and Deeds of Hildebrand"). The editio princeps (first edition) was published either at Cologne (1532?) or Basel (1530×34), certainly before a second edition appeared at Cologne in the Fasciculus rerum expetendarum et fugiendarum of Ortwinus Gratius in 1535. (Note: An English translation by the evangelical preacher Thomas Swinnerton was published at London probably in 1534.) Gesta Romanae is actually the title, found in the manuscript, for the first two letters in a collection of eight written by the anti-Gregorian cardinals. This eight-letter document has the collective title Benonis aliorumque cardinalium scripta ("Writings of Beno and the Other Cardinals"). The third letter, Contra decreta Hildebrandi ("Against Hildebrand's Decrees"), was written by the copyist. Beno's two letters are addressed, respectively, to "the most revered mother of the holy Roman church" (Note: reverentissimae matri sanctae Romanae aecclesiae) and to "the venerable fathers of the Roman church", (Note: venerandis aecclesiae Romanae patribus) that is, the cardinals. In the first letter, Beno says that at the time of writing he was the archpriest (cardinalium archipresbyter), the head of the cardinal-priests, and that John of Santa Maria in Domnica was then archdeacon, head of the cardinal deacons. This places the writing later than November 1084, at which time Leo of San Lorenzo in Damaso was archpriest and Theodinus archdeacon. In the second letter, Beno explicitly refers to the pontificate of Urban II (1088–99), whom he nicknames "Turbanus". The anti-Urbanist tract De Albino et Rufino was attributed to Beno on slim evidence by Julius von Pflugk-Harttung in the 19th century.

Beno was probably dead by 18 October 1099, when he did not sign a bull issued by Clement in favour of Roman, cardinal-priest of San Marco, and signed by almost the entire college of cardinals loyal to the antipope. His church was next found in the hands of Benedict, a cardinal loyal to Urban.
