= Mark 11 =

- ← chapter 10 chapter 12 →
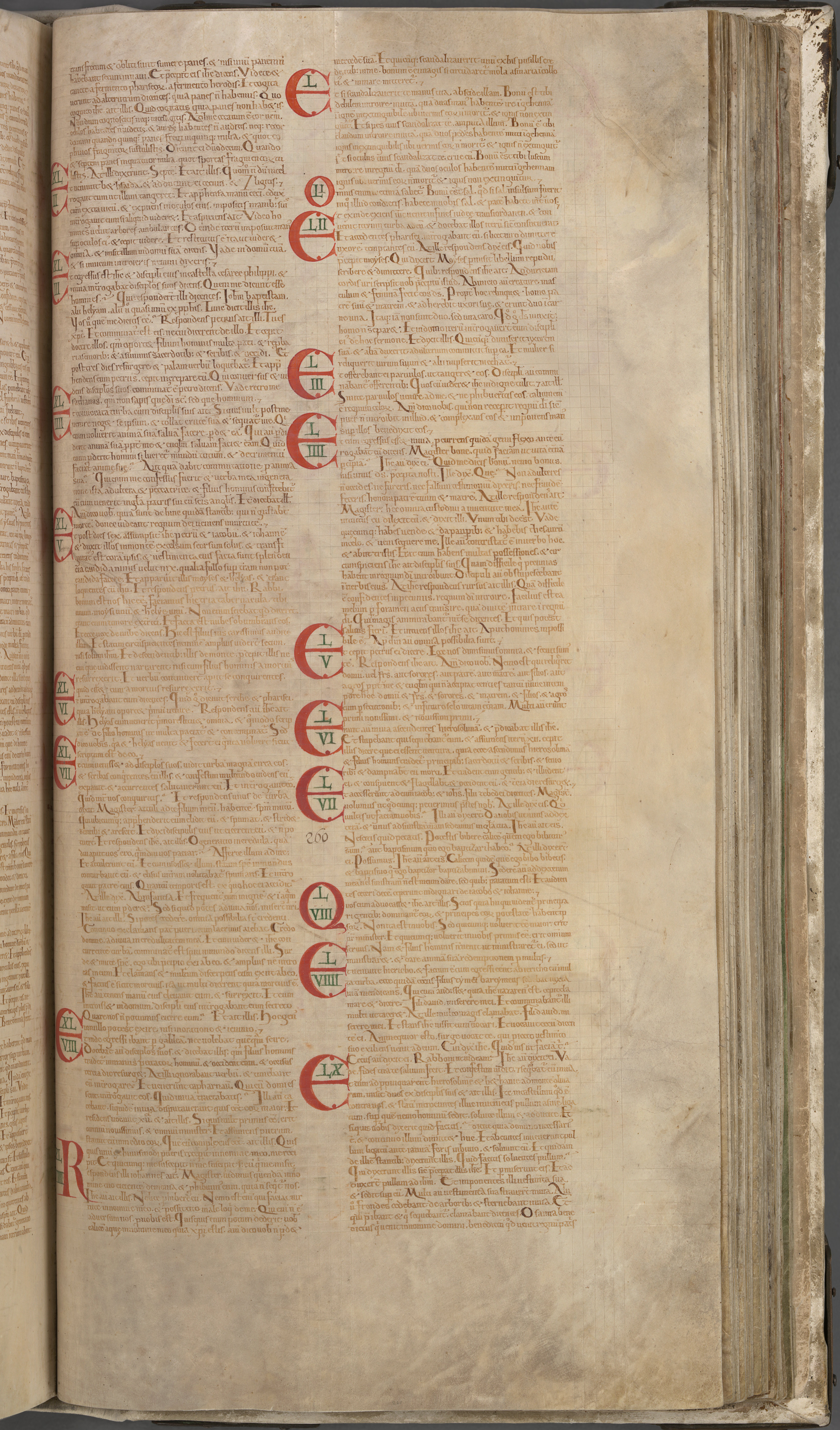
- The Latin text of Mark 8:13–11:10 in Codex Gigas (13th century)
- Book: Gospel of Mark
- Category: Gospel
- Christian Bible part: New Testament
- Order in the Christian part: 2

Mark 11 is the eleventh chapter of the Gospel of Mark in the New Testament of the Christian Bible, beginning Jesus' final "hectic" week, before his death as he arrives in Jerusalem for the coming Passover. It contains the stories of Jesus's entry into Jerusalem, his cursing of the fig tree, his conflict with the Temple money changers, and his argument with the chief priests and elders about his authority. Biblical commentator Christopher Tuckett notes that "the Passion narrative in Mark is usually adjudged to start at chapter 14, but there is a real sense in which it can be said to start ... at the start of chapter 11".

== Text ==
The original text was written in Koine Greek. This chapter is divided into 33 verses.

=== Textual witnesses ===
Some early manuscripts containing the text of this chapter are:

- Codex Vaticanus (325–350; complete)
- Codex Sinaiticus (330–360; complete)
- Codex Bezae (~400; complete)
- Codex Alexandrinus (400–440; complete)
- Codex Ephraemi Rescriptus (~450; complete)

== Timescale ==
Verses 1–11 reflect the events commemorated by Christians on Palm Sunday. Verses 12–19 record actions of "the next day", and end that evening. Verses 20–33 commence early (Greek: πρωῒ, prói), the following morning. Tuckett argues that Mark has "very likely" compressed a series of events into a single week whereas it is more plausible to assume they took place over a longer period of time.

== Triumphal entry into Jerusalem ==
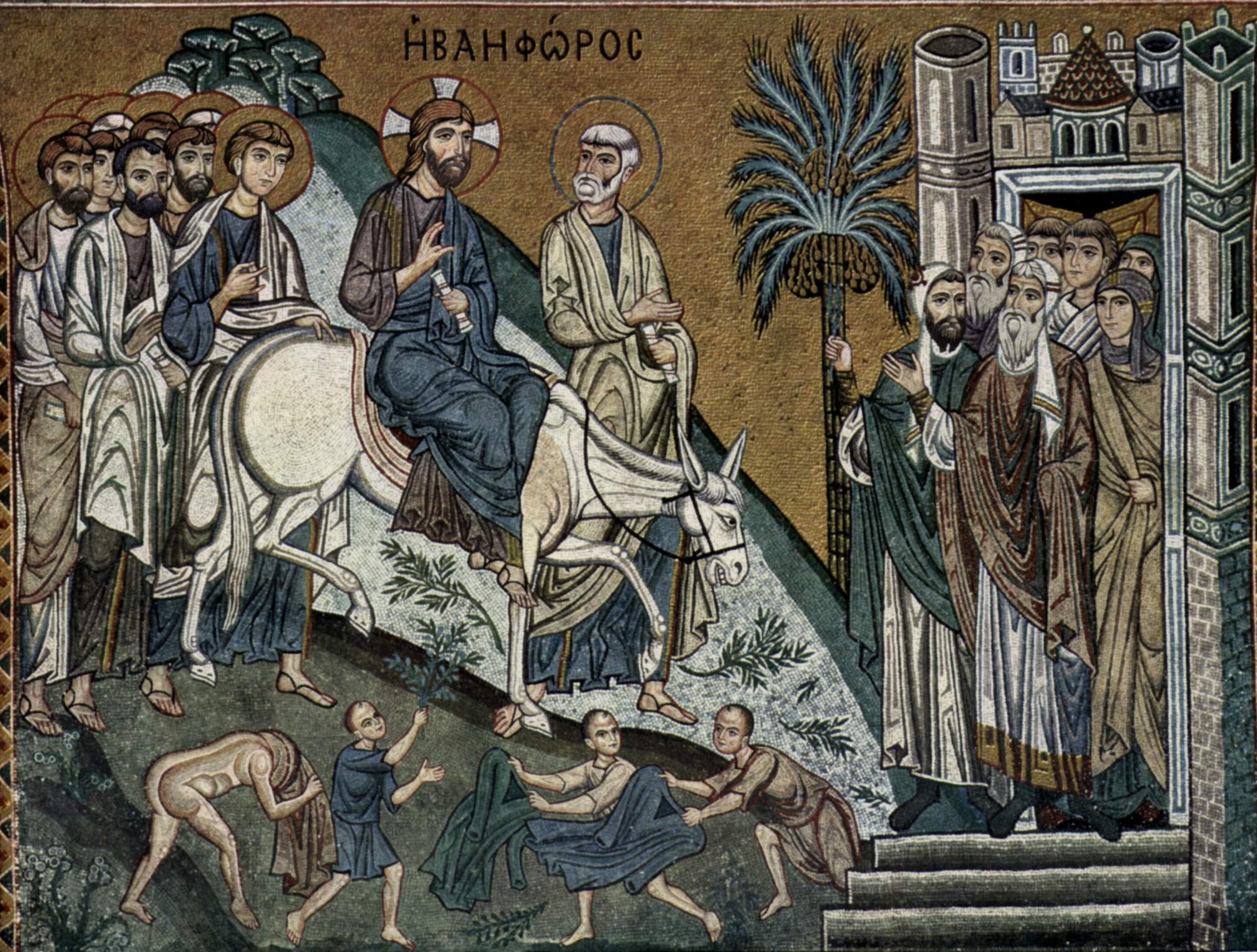
Einzug Christi in Jerusalem by Meister der Palastkapelle

Jesus and his disciples approach Bethphage and Bethany, towns on the edge of Jerusalem. Bethany was about two miles (3.2 km) east of the city on the Mount of Olives. Zechariah 14:4 has the final messianic battle occurring on the Mount of Olives. Bethphage is Aramaic for house of unripe figs, perhaps Mark's foreshadowing of the story of the fig tree.

Jesus instructs two unnamed disciples to go ahead to the town and collect a colt, by which he almost assuredly means a young donkey, which he says will be tied up and has never been ridden, for him to ride. This is to fulfill Messianic prophecies, such as Zechariah 9:9, which is quoted in every Gospel except Mark. He instructs them that if anyone questions them they should say "The Lord has need of it and will send it back here immediately." Mark 11:3, where Mark uses a double entendre as the "Lord" is meant as the owner of the colt and Jesus. The two go and find the colt as Jesus had predicted and start to untie it and people standing nearby ask what they are up to and they tell them what Jesus told them to say and amazingly they leave them alone. Mark leaves the event seemingly showing Jesus's power of prediction, but it could be argued that the people already knew Jesus as this town was his base of operations over the next several days: according to Mark and the other Gospels, Jesus also had friends there including Lazarus, his sisters, and Simon the Leper.

They bring the colt back to Jesus and put their cloaks on it and Jesus rides it into Jerusalem and people lay their cloaks and tree branches before him, singing him praise as the Son of David and a line from Psalm 118:25–26:

"Hosanna! Blessed is he who comes in the name of the Lord! Blessed is the coming kingdom of our father David! Hosanna in the highest!"

The Textus Receptus repeats the words ἑν ὀνόματι Κυρίου (en onomati kuriou, "in the name of the Lord") in verse 10 as well as verse 9:

"Blessed is the kingdom of our father David that comes in the name of the Lord!"

The ancient Codex Alexandrinus supports the duplication, but other early manuscripts, the Vulgate and the writings of Origen omit these words from verse 10.

The quotation from the Psalms is significant, as the composition of the Psalms is traditionally ascribed to King David. The word ὡσαννά, (Hosanna, "save us please") is derived from Aramaic (הושע נא) (see Aramaic of Jesus#Hosana) from Hebrew (הושיעה נא) (Psalm 118:25, הוֹשִׁיעָה נָּא), meaning "help" or "save, I pray", "an appeal that became a liturgical formula; as part of the Hallel ... familiar to everyone in Israel."

This event is celebrated by Christians as Palm Sunday, as the Gospel of John says the branches were taken from palm trees.

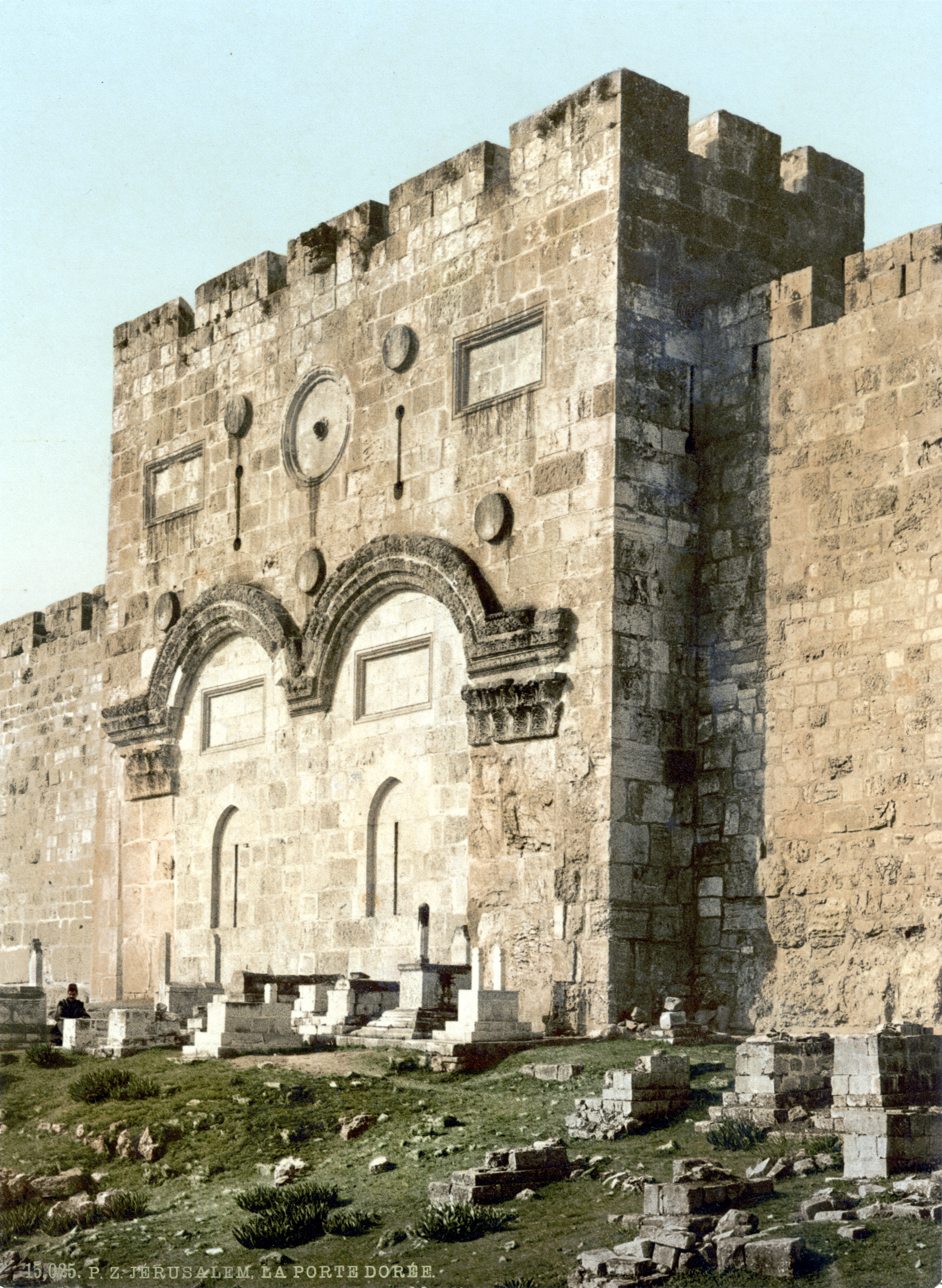
The Golden Gate or Sha'ar Harachamim

=== Verse 11 ===
And Jesus went into Jerusalem and into the temple. So when He had looked around at all things, as the hour was already late, He went out to Bethany with the twelve.

He goes into the city and checks out the Temple. Where this entry took place is unknown, some believing it was through what is now called the Golden Gate where it was believed the Messiah would enter Jerusalem. Others think he might have used an entrance to the south that had stairs that led directly to the Temple. The crowd seems to have dispersed before Jesus reaches the Temple. He surveys the scene, but because it is late he leaves and goes back to Bethany. There were two areas of the Temple, the main area of the building where people's activity took place and the inner sanctuary, also called the Temple, where the power of God was thought to reside.

== The fig tree and the money changers ==
As they leave Bethany next day, Jesus, who is hungry, sees a fig tree at (or from) a distance and goes over to see if it has figs. George Maclear suggests he may have fasted overnight. It is too early in the year for the tree to produce fruit, and it has none. Jesus curses it (see verse 21): "May no one ever eat fruit from you again", words which his disciples hear.

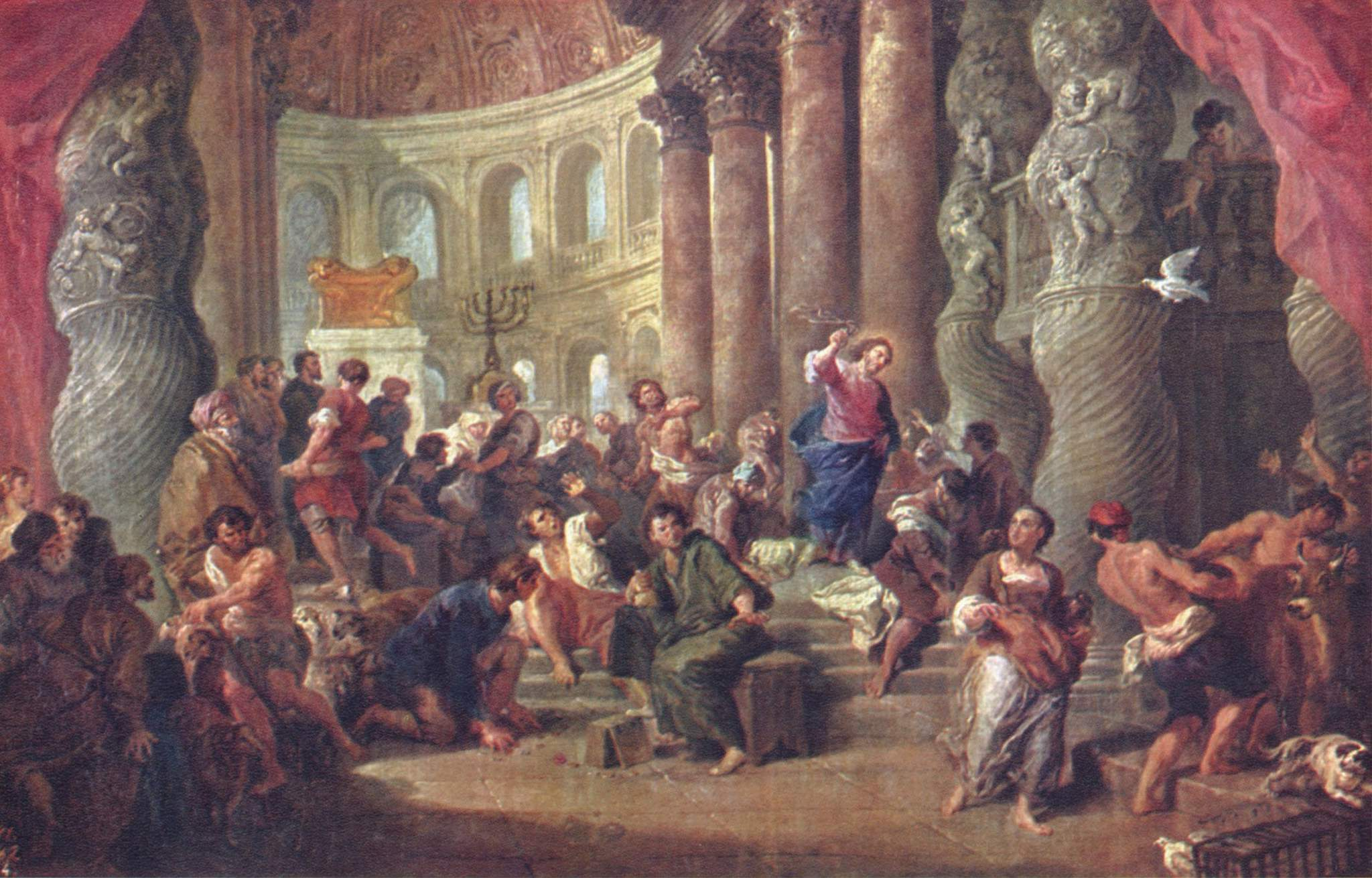
Jesus vertreibt die Händler aus dem Tempel by Giovanni Paolo Pannini

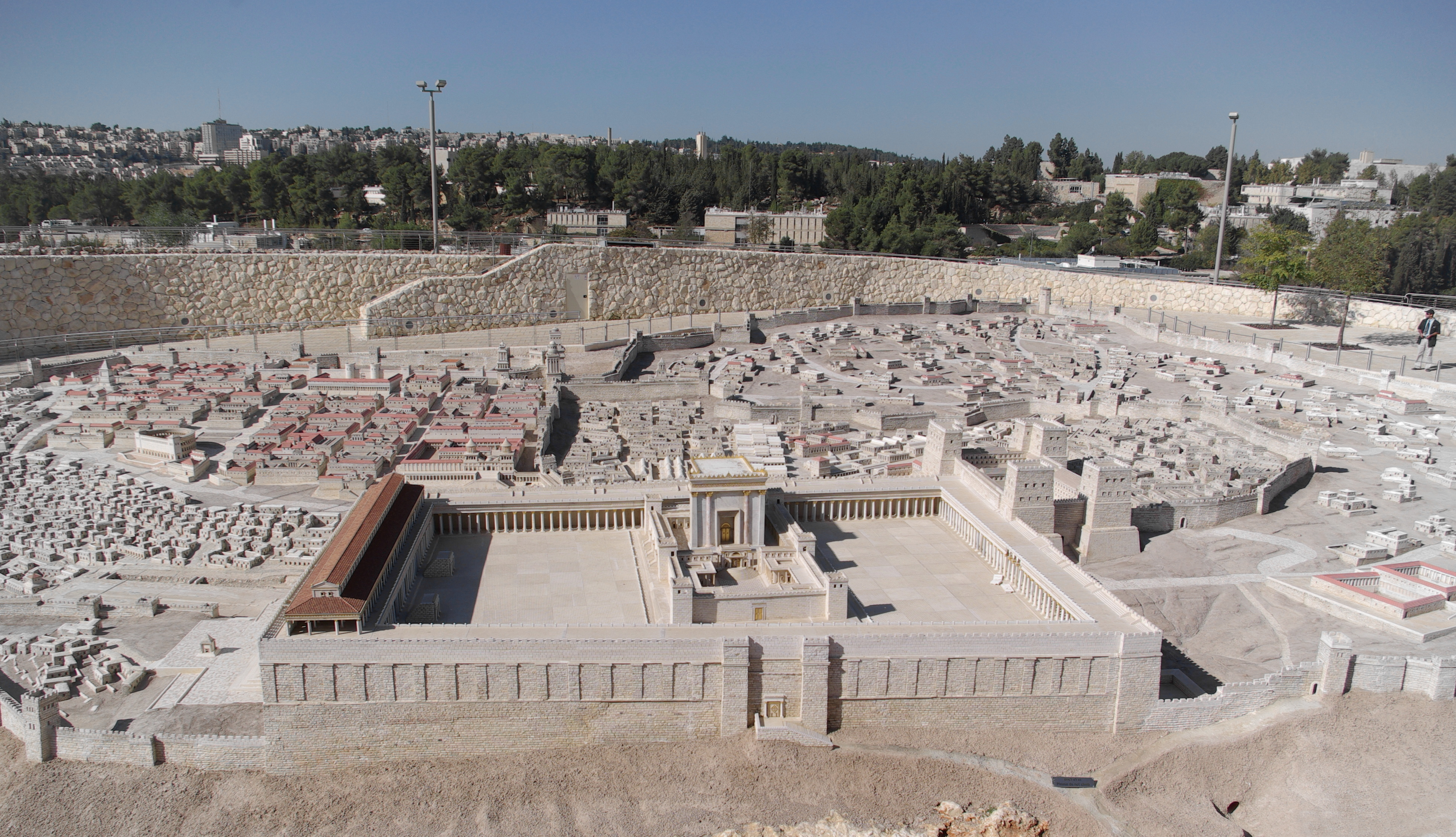
A model of Herod's Temple adjacent to the Shrine of the Book exhibit at the Israel Museum, Jerusalem

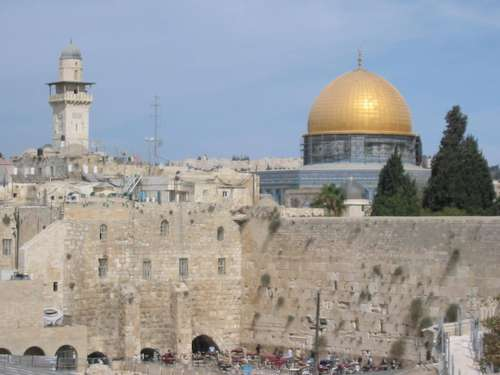
The Temple Mount as it appears today. The West Wall is in the foreground with the Dome of the Rock rising over the Mount.

They reach Jerusalem and Jesus goes straight to the Temple, Herod's Temple, and starts, without explanation, throwing over tables and driving the dove salesman and money changers from the courtyard of the Temple and stops people from bringing anything for sale through the Temple courts (11:15–19). The doves were used for sacrifices and the standard Greek or Roman money used by people had to be changed into special blessed Jewish or Tyrian money suitable for use. This is what Jesus told everyone there:

=== Verse 17 ===
And he taught, saying unto them,

Is it not written, My house shall be called of all nations the house of prayer?
but ye have made it a den of thieves.

- Cross reference: Matthew 21:13, Luke 19:46

Jesus combines quotes from Isaiah 56:7 and Jeremiah 7:11 in Matthew 21:13, which is a parallel verse to this verse and Luke 19:46. Both are from expositions on the nature of the Temple. The quote from Isaiah comes from a section about how all who obey God's will, Jewish or not, are to be allowed into the Temple so they can pray and therefore converse with God. The passage in Jeremiah is from a chapter on the futility of worship on the part of those who do not obey God's will. People making money off of worshipping God right inside God's own Temple seems to Jesus to be a corruption of God's intention. "Den of thieves" might be a reference to extortionary pricing for the doves and money. The people are amazed by Jesus and his teaching, which drives the chief priests to plot to kill him. Jesus and his group however leave the city at the end of the day.

The incident with the money changers is recorded in all the Gospels. The synoptics have basically the same story as Mark. John 2:12–25 has the incident occurring at the start of his book and therefore Jesus's ministry. He expels the dove salesmen and money changers but does not quote from the Old Testament, instead saying "How dare you turn my Father's house into a market!". The disciples remember "Zeal for your house will consume me." Psalm 69:9 Most scholars hold that this is the same incident and that it really occurred shortly before Jesus's death. A minority hold that there were two incidents with the money changers, once at the beginning and once at the end of Jesus's mission.

According to the Jewish Encyclopedia article on Jesus: In the Temple

This would appear to have been on the first day of the week and on the 10th of Nisan, when, according to the Law, it was necessary that the paschal lamb should be purchased. It is therefore probable that the entry into Jerusalem was for this purpose. In making the purchase of the lamb a dispute appears to have arisen between Jesus's followers and the money-changers who arranged for such purchases; and the latter were, at any rate for that day, driven from the Temple precincts. It would appear from Talmudic references that this action had no lasting effect, if any, for Simon ben Gamaliel found much the same state of affairs much later (Ker. i. 7) and effected some reforms (see Derenbourg in "Histoire de la Palestine," p. 527). The act drew public attention to Jesus, who during the next few days was asked to define His position toward the conflicting parties in Jerusalem. It seemed especially to attack the emoluments of the priestly class, which accordingly asked Him to declare by what authority He had interfered with the sacrosanct arrangements of the Temple. In a somewhat enigmatic reply He placed his own claims on a level with those of John the Baptist — in other words, he based them on popular support.

The Jesus Seminar concluded that this was a "pink" act, "a close approximation of what Jesus did", as recorded in Mark 11:15–19, Matthew 21:12–17, Luke 19:45–48 and called the "Temple incident" and the primary cause of the crucifixion.

The next morning they pass by the fig tree again and Peter notices that it is now "withered", and excitedly points it out to Jesus, who replies:

Have faith in God,...I tell you the truth, if anyone says to this mountain, 'Go, throw yourself into the sea', and does not doubt in his heart but believes that what he says will happen, it will be done for him. Therefore I tell you, whatever you ask for in prayer, believe that you have received it, and it will be yours. (22–23)

Similar statements can be found, apart from the fig tree story, in Matthew 17:20 and Luke 17:6 as well as in saying 48 of the Gospel of Thomas. Saint Paul also mentions faith that can move mountains in 1 Corinthians 13:2.

Some have argued that Jesus's action in regard to the fig tree seems illogical, since it was not the time of year for trees to bear fruit and one might assume that a divine Jesus would know that the tree would not have figs or could have simply produced the figs by a miracle as opposed to cursing the tree. Bertrand Russell, the agnostic philosopher, even listed this story as one of his reasons for not being a Christian. The cursing of the tree displays Jesus's power and the power of prayer coupled with full belief in God. Mark, placing the fig tree before and after the incident in the Temple, may be using the fig tree as a metaphor for what he sees as the barrenness of the priests and the withering of their teaching and authority due to their lack of true faith. Just like with the fig tree, Jesus had hoped to find "fruit", the fruit of true worship of God, at the Temple but it is not the right time for this, and so the Temple, like the fig tree, is cursed. Exegetes often take this as one of Mark's references to the destruction of the Temple by the Romans, and consequently their dating of Mark after this event.

The fig tree is again mentioned in Mark 13:28 by Jesus as part of his eschatological discourse, when its leaves will be full and it will be bearing fruit in the summer, as opposed to the current spring. Matthew has roughly the same story but not Luke or John, although Luke 13:6–9 has Jesus relating a parable, The Parable of the Barren Fig Tree, about a man not finding fruit on a fig tree. Thomas has Jesus talking about thistles not yielding figs in saying 45, which is also found in the Sermon on the Mount in Matthew 7:16.

This section of Mark ends with verses 11:25–26 which are paralleled in Matthew 6:14–15 and Luke 6:37,11:4 which some have seen as a portion or a follow-on of the Lord's Prayer (see also Discourse on ostentation#Prayer): forgive others so that God may forgive you.

== Argument over Jesus's authority ==
Jesus then goes back to the Temple a third time, and as he walks through the Temple courts the priests, teachers (or scribes), and elders come up to him and question his authority to do the things that he is doing. They are trying to force him to say that his authority comes from God and can therefore accuse him of blasphemy.

Jesus says that he will tell them if they answer him one question: "John's baptism — was it from heaven, or from men? Tell me!" (30) The priests are then trapped. Mark implies that they did not believe in John, so that if they answer from heaven people will ask why they did not believe John. If they answer from men, they would be in conflict with the people, who did believe in John. They therefore refuse to answer and accordingly so does Jesus. This allows him to make the priests look bad and incompetent and also allows him to imply to the people that his authority is from God without saying it.

This is the first time in Mark that the chief priests, members of the Sanhedrin, are presented among Jesus's opponents. His previous conflicts had been with the Pharisees, allied with the Herodians, and the scribes or teachers of the law. Jesus has several arguments with the Jewish authorities beginning here and lasting through chapter 12, in which they try to trip him up but continually fail. The editors of the New American Bible Revised Edition note that by Mark 12:18, the "mounting hostility" of all these parties has been marshalled against Jesus.

== Comparison with other canonical gospels ==
Matthew records these stories in chapter 21, with the differences that Jesus fights with the money changers the day He gets to Jerusalem and He heals several blind and lame people afterwards. Jesus curses the fig tree the next morning and it withers immediately.

Luke has all of this content in 19:28–20:8, except for the fig tree, and includes an explicit prediction by Jesus of Jerusalem's destruction. He also states the Pharisees tried to silence His followers praise of Him during his entry into Jerusalem and, like Matthew, Luke says Jesus expelled the money changers on the day He arrived there.

John 12 has Jesus arrive in Bethany and have dinner with Lazarus and his sisters Mary and Martha after raising Him from the dead. The next day he finds the colt, John making no mention of the disciples, and rides it into Jerusalem with the same Psalm being sung. He then teaches the crowd in Jerusalem, John having the incident in the Temple before Jesus's final trip to Jerusalem.

== See also ==
- Related Bible parts: Isaiah 56, Jeremiah 7, Matthew 21, Luke 19

== Sources ==
- Brown, Raymond E., An Introduction to the New Testament, Doubleday 1997 ISBN 0-385-24767-2
- Brown, Raymond E. et al., The New Jerome Biblical Commentary, Prentice Hall 1990 ISBN 0-13-614934-0
- Kilgallen, John J., A Brief Commentary on the Gospel of Mark, Paulist Press 1989 ISBN 0-8091-3059-9
- Miller, Robert J., editor, The Complete Gospels, Polebridge Press 1994 ISBN 0-06-065587-9

| Preceded by Mark 10 | Chapters of the Bible; Gospel of Mark | Succeeded by Mark 12 |
