= Matthew 5:43 =

- ← 5:42 5:44 →
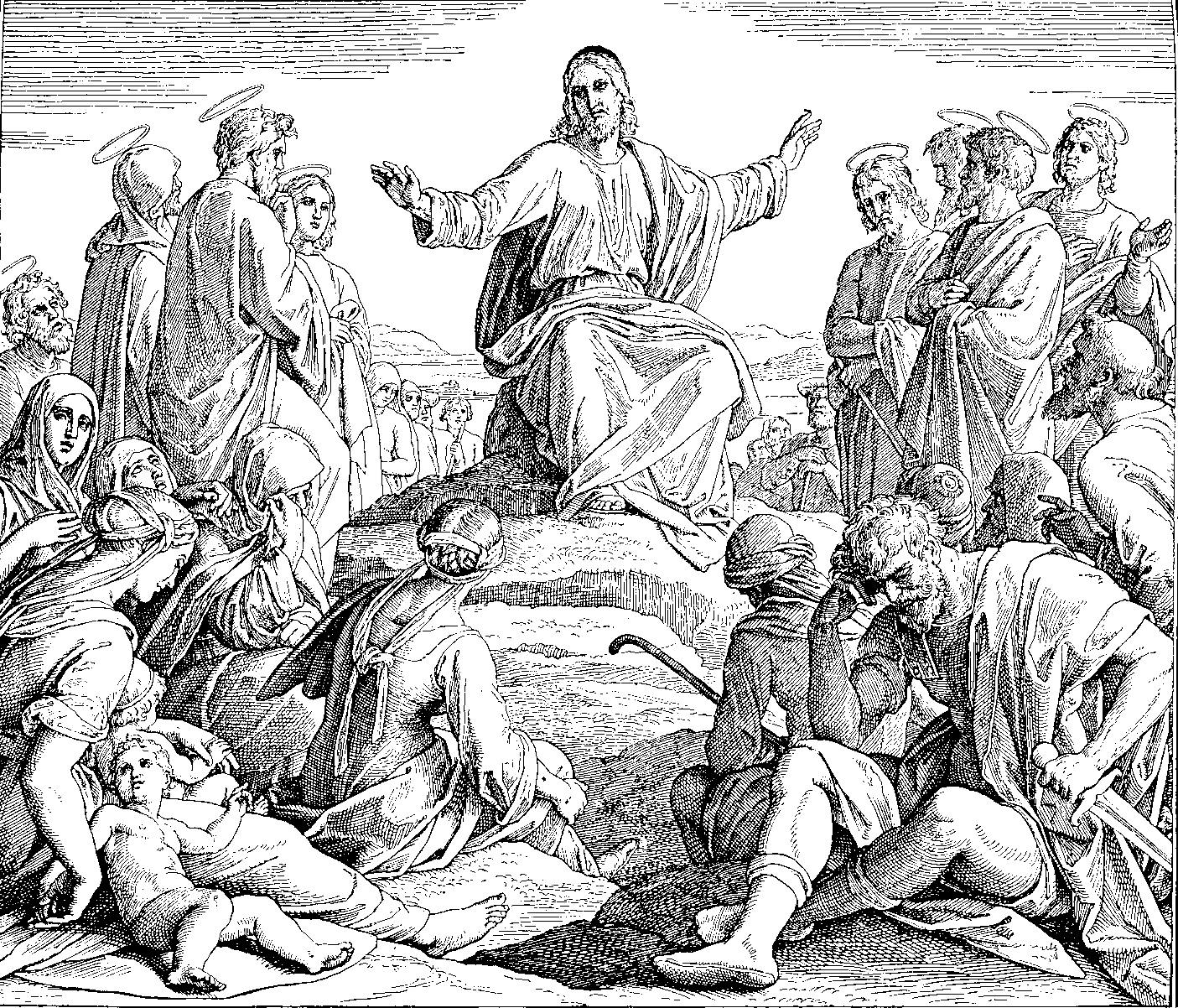
- "Sermon on the Mount"; woodcut for "Die Bibel in Bildern", 1860
- Book: Gospel of Matthew
- Christian Bible part: New Testament

Matthew 5:43 is the forty-third verse of the fifth chapter of the Gospel of Matthew in the New Testament and is part of the Sermon on the Mount. This verse is the opening of the final antithesis, that on the commandment to "Love thy neighbour as thyself".

== Content ==
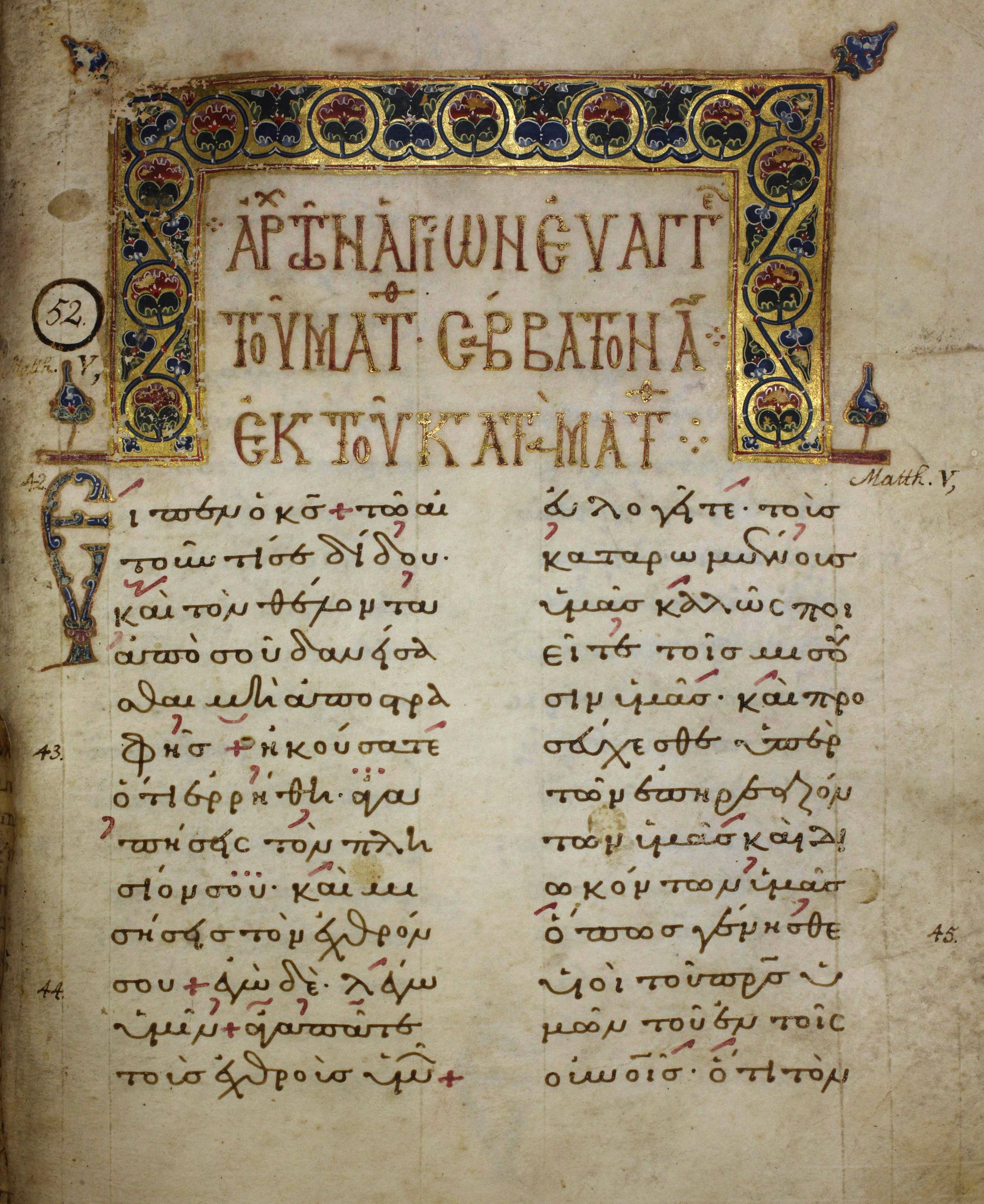
The Greek text of Matthew 5:42-45 with a decorated headpiece in Folio 51 recto of Lectionary 240 (12th century)

In the King James Version of the Bible the text reads:

Ye have heard that it hath been said, Thou
shalt love thy neighbour, and hate thine enemy.

The World English Bible translates the passage as:

"You have heard that it was said, 'You shall
love your neighbor, and hate your enemy.'"

The Novum Testamentum Graece text is:

Ἠκούσατε ὅτι ἐρρέθη
Ἀγαπήσεις τὸν πλησίον σου καὶ μισήσεις τὸν ἐχθρόν σου.

== Analysis ==
This verse begins like the other antitheses with a reference to the Old Testament. "Love your neighbour" comes from Leviticus 19:18 and is part of the Great Commandment. In Jesus' time neighbour was interpreted to mean fellow Israelites, and to exclude all others. In full the Leviticus verse states that you should love your neighbour "as you love yourself." Leaving out this last phrase somewhat reduces its demands. As the second part makes clear, however, Jesus was probably not making a reference to scripture, but rather to a common interpretation.

Nowhere in the Old Testament does it directly state that one should hate one's enemies, but it is implied by several verses, such as in Psalm 137 that calls for vengeance. However at several places in the Old Testament there are also limited calls to love one's enemies such as 1 Samuel 24:19. At the time Jewish thinkers were thus divided, some extolled universal love, others hatred of enemies. One of the clearest hatred commands is found in the rules of the Qumran community, which stated that believers should love everyone God has elected and hate everyone he has cast aside. Nolland notes that the idea of reciprocity, doing good to those who do you good, and evil to those who do you evil was also a central doctrine of Greco-Roman ethics, addressed by scholars such as Plato.

== See also ==
- Brotherly love (philosophy)#Hate thy enemy?
- Jewish ethics
- Judaism and peace
- Judaism and war

== Bibliography ==
- Morris, Leon. The Gospel According to Matthew. Grand Rapids: William B. Eerdmans, 1992.
- Sabourin, Leopold. The Gospel According to Matthew. Bombay: St. Paul Publications, 1983.
- Schweizer, Eduard. The Good News According to Matthew. Atlanta: John Knox Press, 1975

Preceded by Matthew 5:42	Gospel of Matthew; Chapter 5	Succeeded by Matthew 5:44
