= Matthew 5:47 =

- ← 5:46 5:48 →
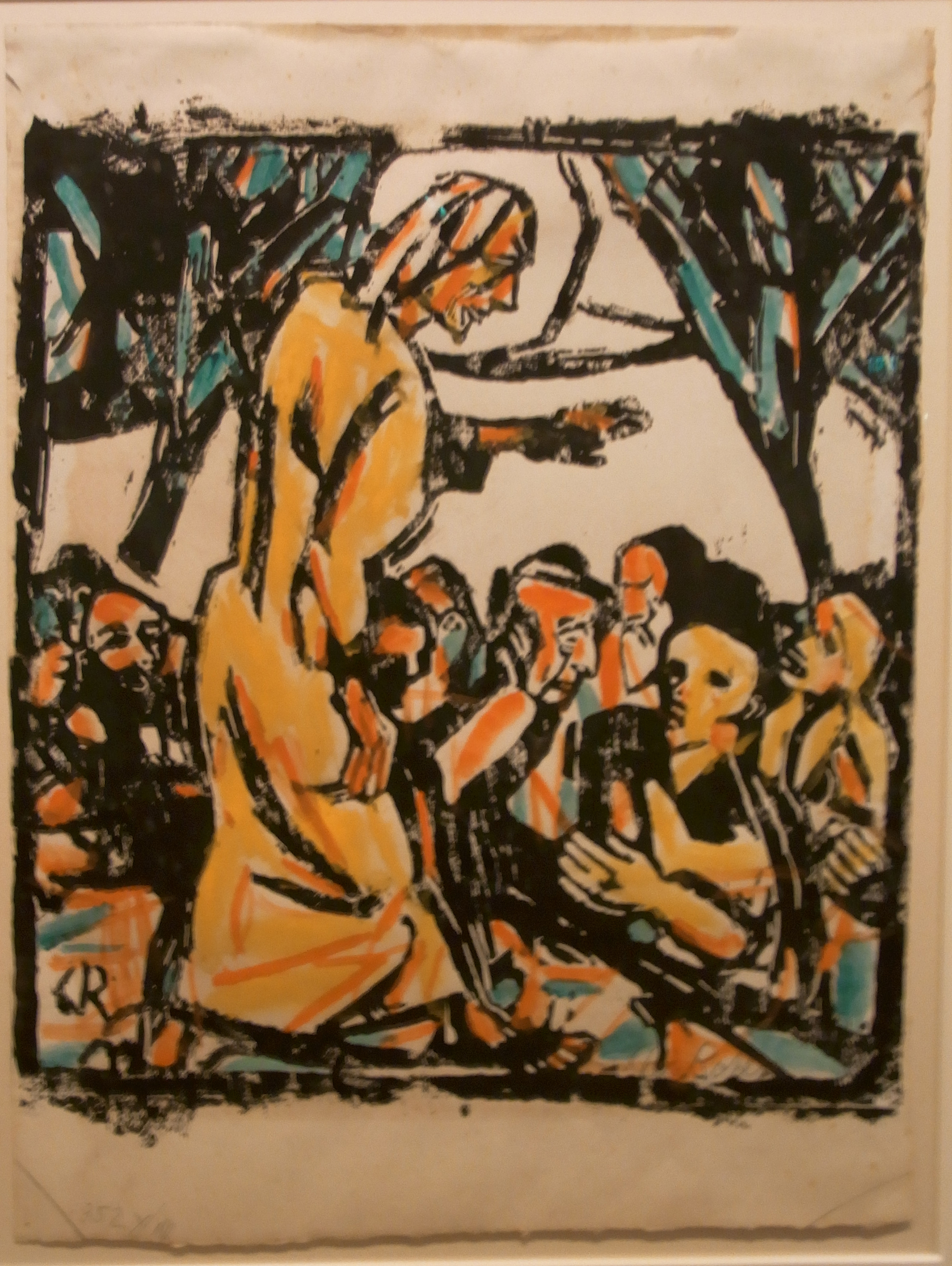
- "Sermon on the Mount" ,(Bergpredigt, 1916) by Christian Rohlfs (1849–1938).
- Book: Gospel of Matthew
- Christian Bible part: New Testament

Matthew 5:47 is the forty-seventh verse of the fifth chapter of the Gospel of Matthew in the New Testament and is part of the Sermon on the Mount. This is the third verse of the final antithesis, that on the commandment: "Love thy neighbour as thyself". Jesus here gives another example of why one must love one's enemies.

== Content ==
In the King James Version of the Bible the text reads:

And if ye salute your brethren
only, what do ye more than others?
do not even the publicans so?

The New American Standard Bible translates the passage as:

If you greet only your brothers, what more are you doing than others?
Do not even the Gentiles do the same?

The Novum Testamentum Graece text is:

καὶ ἐὰν ἀσπάσησθε τοὺς ἀδελφοὺς ὑμῶν μόνον, τί περισσὸν ποιεῖτε;
οὐχὶ καὶ οἱ ἐθνικοὶ τὸ αὐτὸ ποιοῦσιν;

For a collection of other versions see BibleRef Matthew 5:47

== Analysis ==
This verse has the same basic structure and argument as the previous one. Here Jesus is stating that even the wicked greet their friends, so if you only greet your friends you are no better than they are in this regard.

The Greek text uses the word brothers but this is more accurately interpreted as a reference to friends or to members of the same religious community. The disciples are asked ti perisson poieite?, literally "what superiority do ye?". There are two different versions of this verse. The one both the WEB and KJV use has the word for tax collector, the same as the previous verse. Other ancient manuscripts have the word for gentile or heathen in this verse. Many scholars believe this second version is correct, and the double reference to tax collectors was a copying error that occurred at some point.

The act of greeting or saluting was an important one in Jewish culture of this period. It is far more than a simple greeting, and would generally involve an embrace and an exchange of pleasantries. The individual with greater prestige was expected to initiate the exchange. A greeting implied more than simple acknowledgement, also expressing goodwill and warmth.

Preceded by Matthew 5:46	Gospel of Matthew; Chapter 5	Succeeded by Matthew 5:48
