= Matthew 5:46 =

- ← 5:45 5:47 →
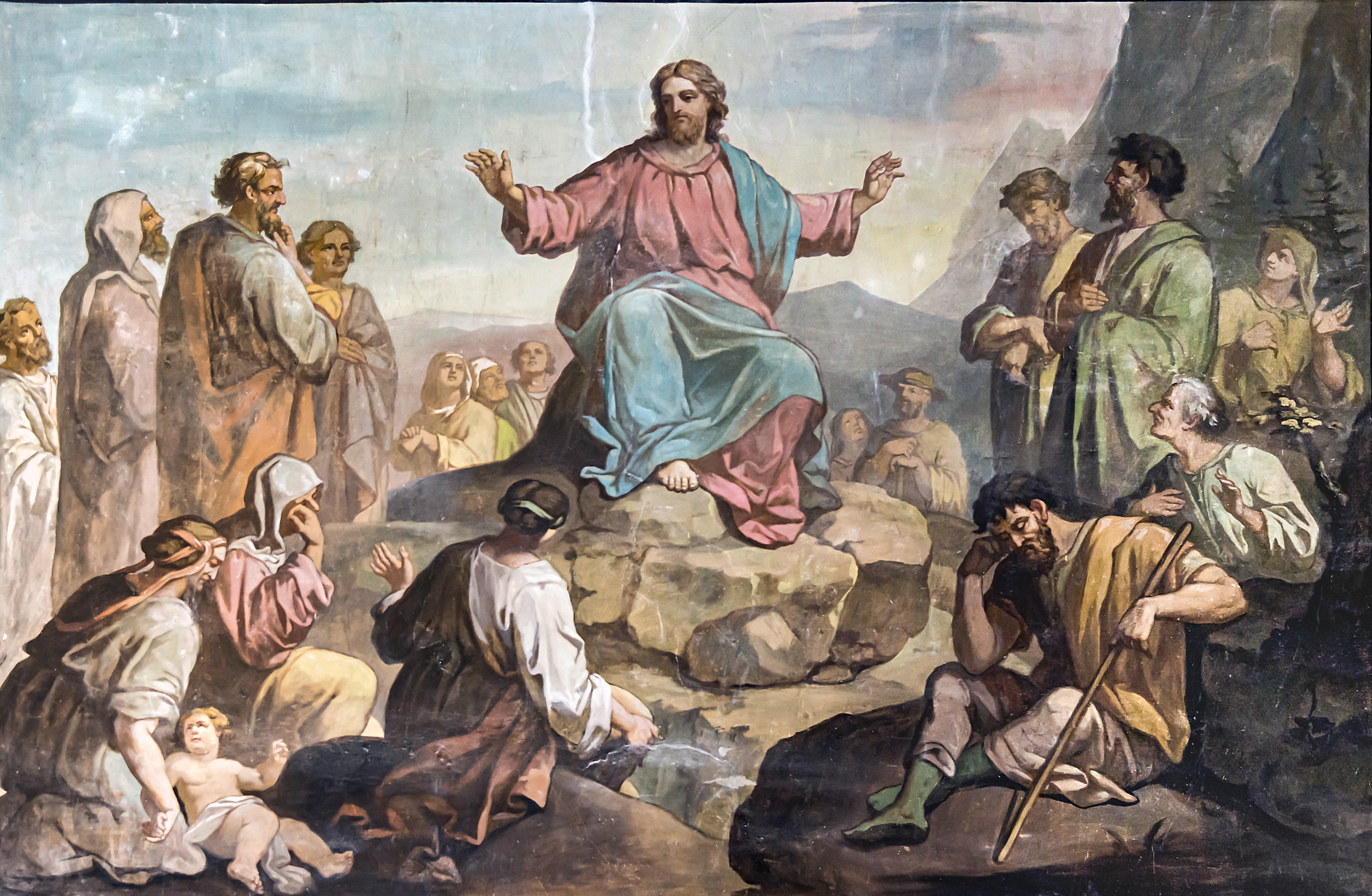
- "The Sermon on the Mountain" (1870) by Arsène Robert (1830-1895). Castelnau-d'Estrétefonds. St. Martin Church - Prix de Rome.
- Book: Gospel of Matthew
- Christian Bible part: New Testament

Matthew 5:46 is the forty-sixth verse of the fifth chapter of the Gospel of Matthew in the New Testament and is part of the Sermon on the Mount. This is the third verse of the final antithesis, built on the commandment "Love thy neighbour as thyself". Jesus here gives another example of why one must love one's enemies.

== Content ==
In the King James Version of the Bible the text reads:

For if ye love them which love
you, what reward have ye? do not
even the publicans the same?

The World English Bible translates the passage as:

For if you love those who love
you, what reward do you have? Don’t
even the tax collectors do the same?

The Novum Testamentum Graece text is:

ἐὰν γὰρ ἀγαπήσητε τοὺς ἀγαπῶντας ὑμᾶς,
τίνα μισθὸν ἔχετε;
οὐχὶ καὶ οἱ τελῶναι τὸ αὐτὸ ποιοῦσιν;

For a collection of other versions see BibleHub Matthew 5:46

== Analysis ==
The basic argument here is that if one only loves those who are close to you, you are no better than the most despised members of society, because they also show love to friends and family. Thus to be truly holy and above the sinful one must go the extra step and not only love friends, but also enemies.

The Greek: οι τελωναι, hoi telonai, was translated as "publicans" in the King James Version and the American Standard Version. The New King James Version, New International Version and Revised Standard Version all prefer to translate as "tax collectors". Either term is used as an example of a malignant group. These tax collectors were Jews in the employ of the Romans who would collect the Roman imposed taxes from the people. They were viewed both as traitors to the Jewish people and as one of the main supports for the Roman occupation. Tax collectors also tended to extort even more money than was owed out of the people. St. Matthew, the traditional author of the Gospel of Matthew, was said to have been a tax collector before becoming a follower of Jesus. Matthew mentions tax collectors three other times in the gospel, at 9:10, 18:17, and 21:31-32, each time portraying them in an unfavourable light. Luke's parallel version of this verse simply has sinners, without stating what type.

This verse again reflects Matthew's interest in rewards, a view some scholars see as one arguing that the main reason to be good is the possible benefits later on.

== Commentary from the Church Fathers ==
Glossa Ordinaria: To love one that loves us is of nature, but to love our enemy of charity. If ye love them who love you, what reward have ye? to wit, in heaven. None truly, for of such it is said, Ye have received your reward. But these things we ought to do, and not leave the other undone.

Rabanus Maurus: If then sinners be led by nature to show kindness to those that love them, with how much greater show of affection ought you not to embrace even those that do not love you? For it follows, Do not even the publicans so? The publicans are those who collect the public imposts; or perhaps those who pursue the public business or the gain of this world.

Glossa Ordinaria: But if you only pray for them that are your kinsfolk, what more has your benevolence than that of the unbelieving? Salutation is a kind of prayer.

Rabanus Maurus: Ethnici, that is, the Gentiles, for the Greek word ἔθνος is translated ‘gens’ in Latin; those, that is, who abide such as they were born, to wit, under sin.

Preceded by Matthew 5:45	Gospel of Matthew; Chapter 5	Succeeded by Matthew 5:47
