= Matthew 5:45 =

- ← 5:44 5:46 →
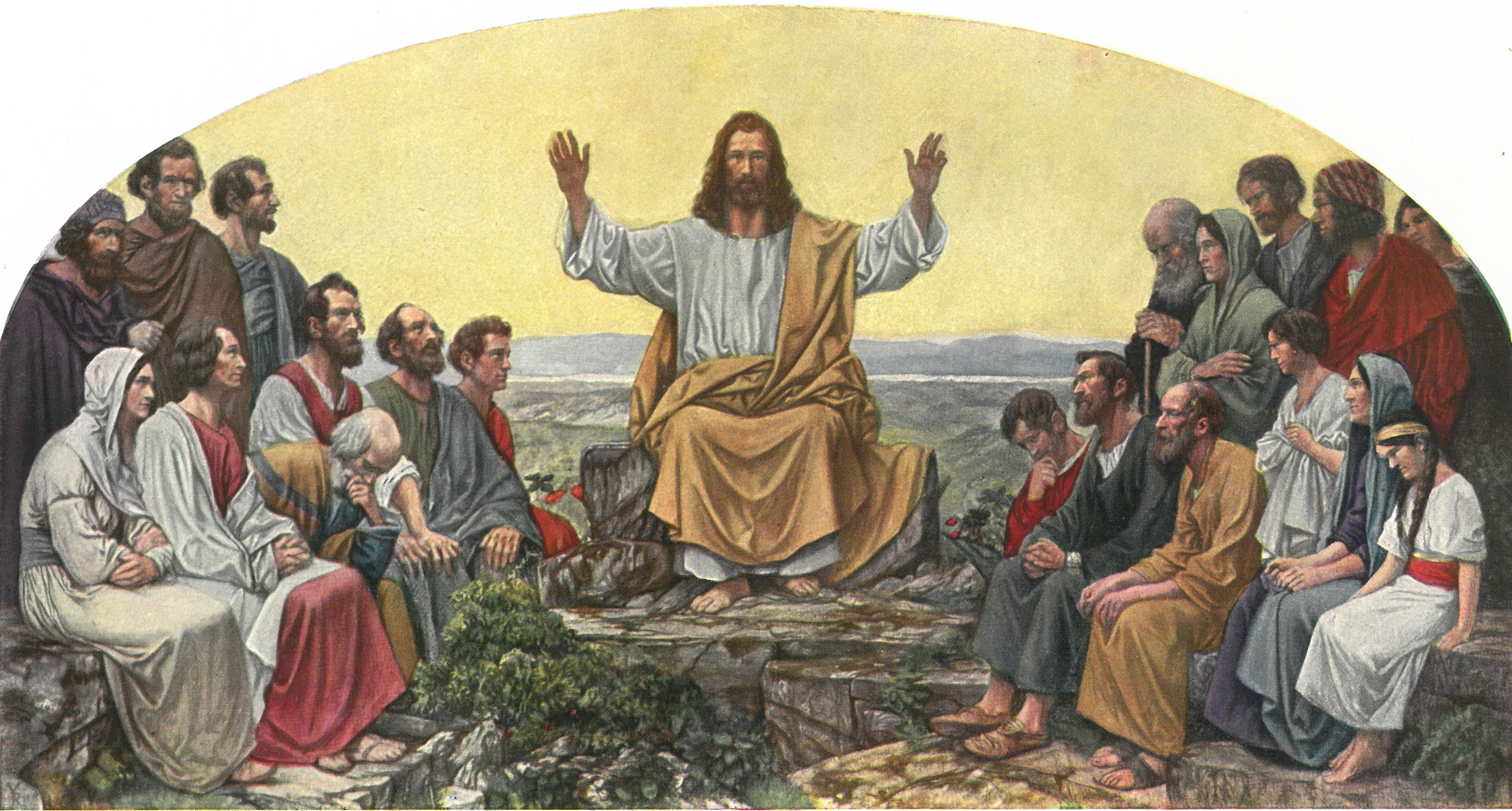
- "Sermon on the Mount" ,(Bergpredigt). From: Der Protestantismus der Gegenwart, Stuttgart 1926, Tafel nach S. 448.
- Book: Gospel of Matthew
- Christian Bible part: New Testament

Matthew 5:45 is the forty-fifth verse of the fifth chapter of the Gospel of Matthew in the New Testament and is part of the Sermon on the Mount. This is the third verse of the final antithesis, that on the commandment: "Love thy neighbour as thyself". Jesus here explains why one must love one's enemies.

== Content ==
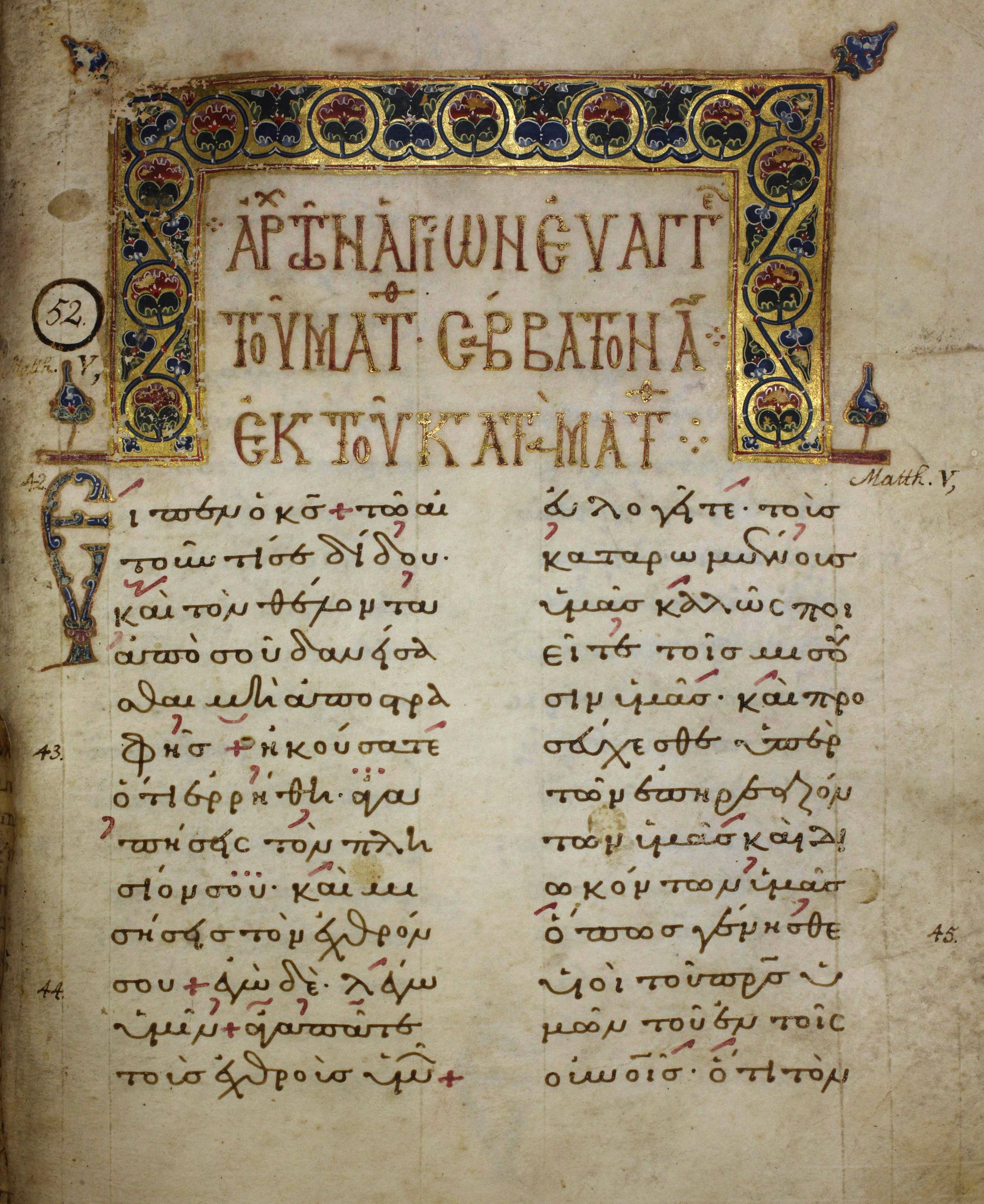
The Greek text of Matthew 5:42-45 with a decorated headpiece in Folio 51 recto of Lectionary 240 (12th century)

In the King James Version of the Bible the text reads:

That ye may be the children of your
Father which is in heaven: for he maketh
his sun to rise on the evil and on the good,
and sendeth rain on the just and on the unjust.

The World English Bible translates the passage as:

That you may be children of your
Father who is in heaven. For he makes
his sun to rise on the evil and the good, and
sends rain on the just and the unjust.

The Novum Testamentum Graece text is:

ὅπως γένησθε υἱοὶ
τοῦ Πατρὸς ὑμῶν τοῦ ἐν οὐρανοῖς,
ὅτι τὸν ἥλιον αὐτοῦ ἀνατέλλει ἐπὶ πονηροὺς καὶ ἀγαθοὺς
καὶ βρέχει ἐπὶ δικαίους καὶ ἀδίκους.

For a collection of other versions see BibleGateway Matthew 5:45

== Analysis ==
Barclay notes that Hebrew had relatively few adjectives, and referring to a person as "son of something" is a way of creating an adjective. Thus "son of peace" is a term for someone who is peaceful, and "son of God" can simply be a term for someone who is godly. Jesus is saying that to be godlike, and thus to be good, one must treat people as God does.

Schweizer notes that in Palestine rain was extremely important and beneficial, the hot sun, was less so. He notes that in Greece at this time the burning power of the sun was often a symbol of godly power while the rain was a symbol of godly benevolence. By contrast, in wetter and more northern societies, rain is often viewed as unpleasant. The prominent Rabbi Joshua ben Nehemiah had made similar note of rain's equal treatment of the good and the wicked, and saw it as a sign of God's benevolence. The Roman philosopher Seneca, writing in the same era as Jesus lived, also has a very similar discussion of how nature aids both the good and the ill.

Jennifer Herdt notes that the language of Matthew 5:45 carries a strong allusion to Wisdom literature including Ecclesiastes 9:2.

Simone Weil cites this as one of only two moments when the Gospels mention the beauty of the natural world.

== Commentary from the Church Fathers ==
Chrysostom: Note through what steps we have now ascended hither, and how He has set us on the very pinnacle of virtue. The first step is, not to begin to do wrong to any; the second, that in avenging a wrong done to us we be content with retaliating equal; the third, to return nothing of what we have suffered; the fourth, to offer one's self to the endurance of evil; the fifth, to be ready to suffer even more evil than the oppressor desires to inflict; the sixth, not to hate him of whom we suffer such things; the seventh, to love him; the eighth, to do him good; the ninth, to pray for him. And because the command is great, the reward proposed is also great, namely, to be made like unto God, Ye shall be the sons of your Father which is in heaven.

Jerome: For whoso keeps the commandments of God is thereby made the son of God; he then of whom he here speaks is not by nature His son, but by his own will.

Augustine: After that rule we must here understand of which John speaks, He gave them power to be made the sons of God. One is His Son by nature; we are made sons by the power which we have received; that is, so far as we fulfil those things that we are commanded. So He says not, Do these things because ye are sons; but, do these things that ye may become sons. In calling us to this then, He calls us to His likeness, for He saith, He maketh His sun to rise on the righteous and the unrighteous. By the sun we may understand not this visible, but that of which it is said, To you that fear the name of the Lord, the Sun of righteousness shall arise; (Mal. 4:2.) and by the rain, the water of the doctrine of truth; for Christ was seen, and was preached to good as well as bad.

Hilary of Poitiers: Or, the sun and rain have reference to the baptism with water and Spirit.

Augustine: Or we may take it of this visible sun, and of the rain by which the fruits are nourished, as the wicked mourn in the book of Wisdom, The Sun has not risen for us. (Wisd. 5:6.) And of the rain it is said, I will command the clouds that they rain not on it. (Is. 5:6.) But whether it be this or that, it is of the great goodness of God, which is set forth for our imitation. lie says not, ‘the sun,’ but, His sun, that is, the sun which Himself has made, that hence we may be admonished with how great liberality we ought to supply those things that we have not created, but have received as a boon from Him.

Augustine: But as we laud Him for His gifts, let us also consider how He chastises those whom He loves. For not every one who spares is a friend, nor every one who chastises an enemy; it is better to love with severity, than to use lenity wherewith to deceive. (vid. Prov. 27:6.)

Pseudo-Chrysostom: He was careful to say, On the righteous and the unrighteous, and not ‘on the unrighteous as on the righteous;’ for God gives all good gifts not for men's sake, but for the saints’ sake, as likewise chastisements for the sake of sinners. In bestowing His good gifts, He does not separate the sinners from the righteous, that they should not despair; so in His inflictions, not the righteous from sinners that they should be made proud; and that the more, since the wicked are not profited by the good things they receive, but turn them to their hurt by their evil lives; nor are the good hurt by the evil things, but rather profit to increase of righteousness.

Augustine: For the good man is not puffed up by worldly goods, nor broken by worldly calamity. But the bad man is punished in temporal losses, because he is corrupted by temporal gains. Or for another reason He would have good and evil common to both sorts of men, that good things might not be sought with vehement desire, when they were enjoyed even by the wicked; nor the evil things shamefully avoided, when even the righteous are afflicted by them.

Preceded by Matthew 5:44	Gospel of Matthew; Chapter 5	Succeeded by Matthew 5:46
