= Matthew 5:42 =

- ← 5:41 5:43 →
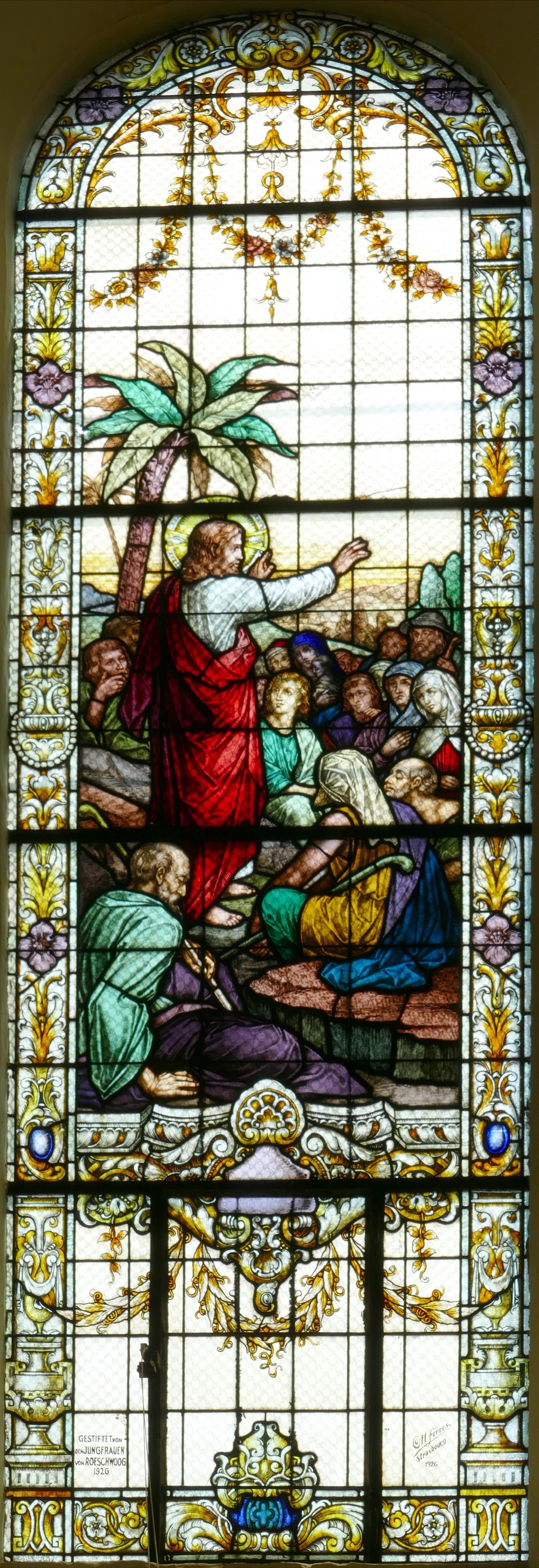
- "Sermon on the Mount". Alsace, Bas-Rhin, Rœschwoog, Église Saint-Barthélemy.
- Book: Gospel of Matthew
- Christian Bible part: New Testament

Matthew 5:42 is the forty-second verse of the fifth chapter of the Gospel of Matthew in the New Testament and is part of the Sermon on the Mount. This is the fifth and last verse of the antithesis on the command: "Eye for an eye".

== Content ==
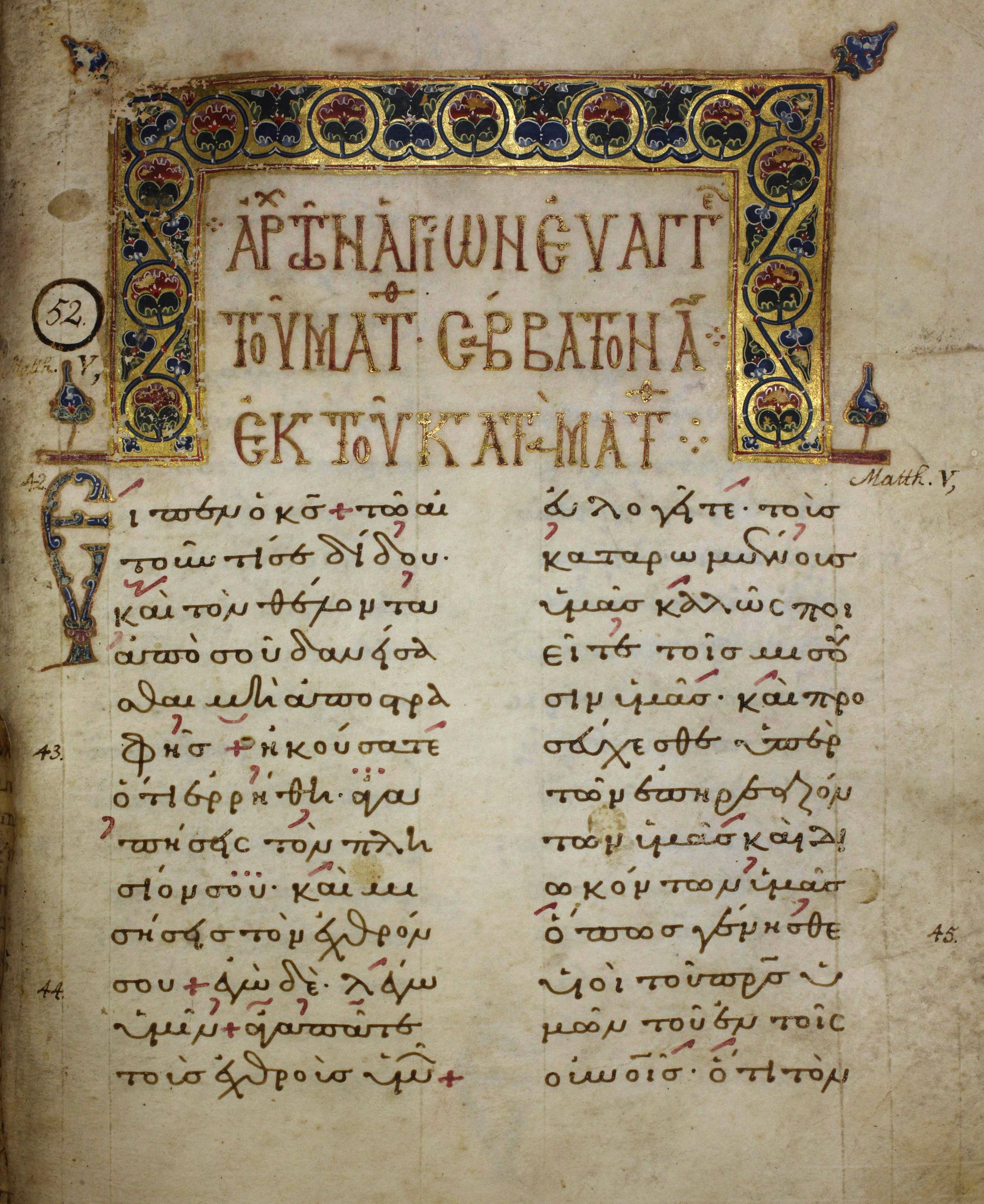
The Greek text of Matthew 5:42-45 with a decorated headpiece in Folio 51 recto of Lectionary 240 (12th century)

In the King James Version of the Bible the text reads:

Give to him that asketh thee, and from him
that would borrow of thee turn not thou away.

The World English Bible translates the passage as:

Give to him who asks you, and don’t turn
away him who desires to borrow from you.

The Novum Testamentum Graece text is:

τῷ αἰτοῦντί σε δός,
καὶ τὸν θέλοντα ἀπὸ σοῦ δανίσασθαι μὴ ἀποστραφῇς.

For a collection of other versions see BibleRef Matthew 5:42

== Analysis ==
This verse is most often seen as a command to be charitable and it is quite similar to Luke 6:30, but while that verse commands believers to give, this one simply states that they should not refuse requests ("lend, hoping for nothing again"). As with other parts of the Sermon on the Mount it is difficult to apply this verse literally, and no major Christian groups advocate such unrestricted charity. Luther argued the verse is restricted only to those who need assistance. Calvin states that generosity is important, but one should never be profligate.

A second interpretation of this verse is that it is not about charity, but rather against usury. The word borrow here is seen by some as a reference to the lending industry. Jesus is not stating that one should give money to anyone that asks, but rather that it is wrong to demand interest. Albright and Mann translate the last portion as "do not refuse one who is unable to pay interest."

== Commentary from the Church Fathers ==
Jerome: If we understand this only of alms, it cannot stand with the estate of the most part of men who are poor; even the rich if they have been always giving, will not be able to continue always to give.

Augustine: Therefore, He says not, ‘Give all things to him that asks;’ but, Give to every one that asketh; that you should only give what you can give honestly and rightly. For what if one ask for money to employ in oppressing the innocent man? What if he ask your consent to unclean sin? We must give then only what will hurt neither ourselves or others, as far as man can judge; and when you have refused an inadmissible request, that you may not send away empty him that asked, show the righteousness of your refusal; and such correction of the unlawful petitioner will often be a better gift than the granting his suit.

Augustine: For with more benefit is food taken from the hungry, if certainty of provision causes him to neglect righteousness, than that food should be supplied to him that he may consent to a deed of violence and wrong.

Jerome: But it maybe understood of the wealth of doctrine: wealth which never fails but the more of it is given away, the more it abounds.

Augustine: That He commands, And from him that would borrow of thee, turn not away, must be referred to the mind; for God loveth a cheerful giver. (2 Cor. 9:7.) And every one that receives, indeed borrows, though it is not he that shall pay, but God, who restores to the merciful many fold. Or, if you like to understand by borrowing, only taking with promise to repay, we must understand the Lord's command as embracing both these kinds of affording aid; whether we give outright, or lend to receive again. And of this last kind of showing mercy it is well said, Turn not away, that is, do not be therefore backward to lend, as though, because man shall repay you, therefore God shall not; for what you do by God's command cannot be without fruit.

Pseudo-Chrysostom: Christ bids us lend but not on usury; for he who gives on such terms does not bestow his own, but takes of another; he looses from one chain to bind with many, and gives not for God's righteousness sake, but for his own gain. For money taken on usury is like the bite of an asp; as the asp's poison secretly consumes the limbs, so usury turns all our possessions into debt.

== See also ==
- Christian anarchism
- Gift economy

Preceded by Matthew 5:41	Gospel of Matthew; Chapter 5	Succeeded by Matthew 5:43
