= Matthew 5:44 =

- ← 5:43 5:45 →
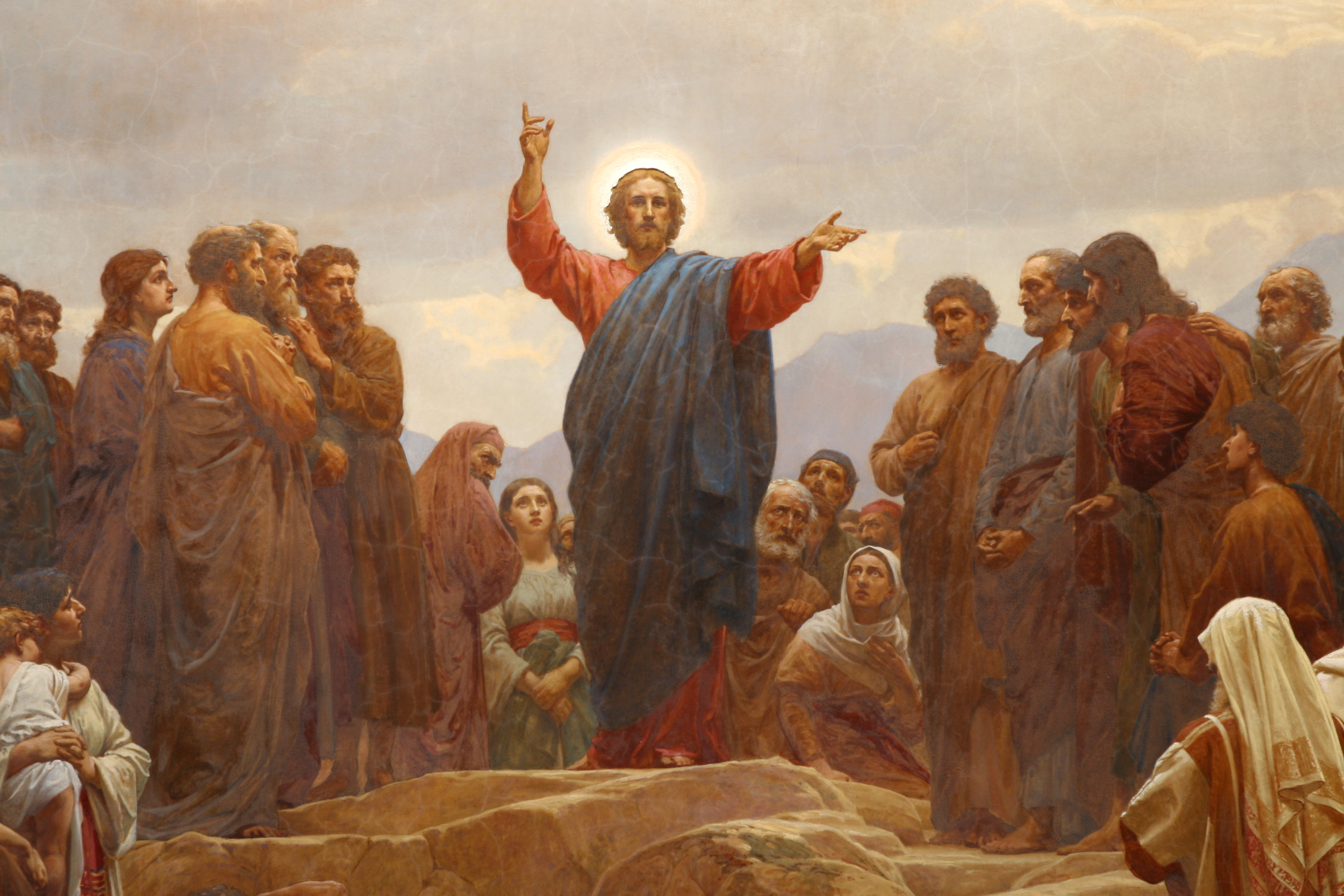
- Sermon on the Mount, altarpiece by Henrik Olrik (1830–1890) at Sankt Matthæus Kirke, Copenhagen, Denmark.
- Book: Gospel of Matthew
- Christian Bible part: New Testament

Matthew 5:44, the forty-fourth verse in the fifth chapter of the Gospel of Matthew in the New Testament, also found in Luke 6:27–36, is part of the Sermon on the Mount. This is the second verse of the final antithesis, which concerns the commandment to "Love thy neighbor as thyself." In this chapter, Jesus refutes the teaching of some that one should "hate [one's] enemies".

== Content ==
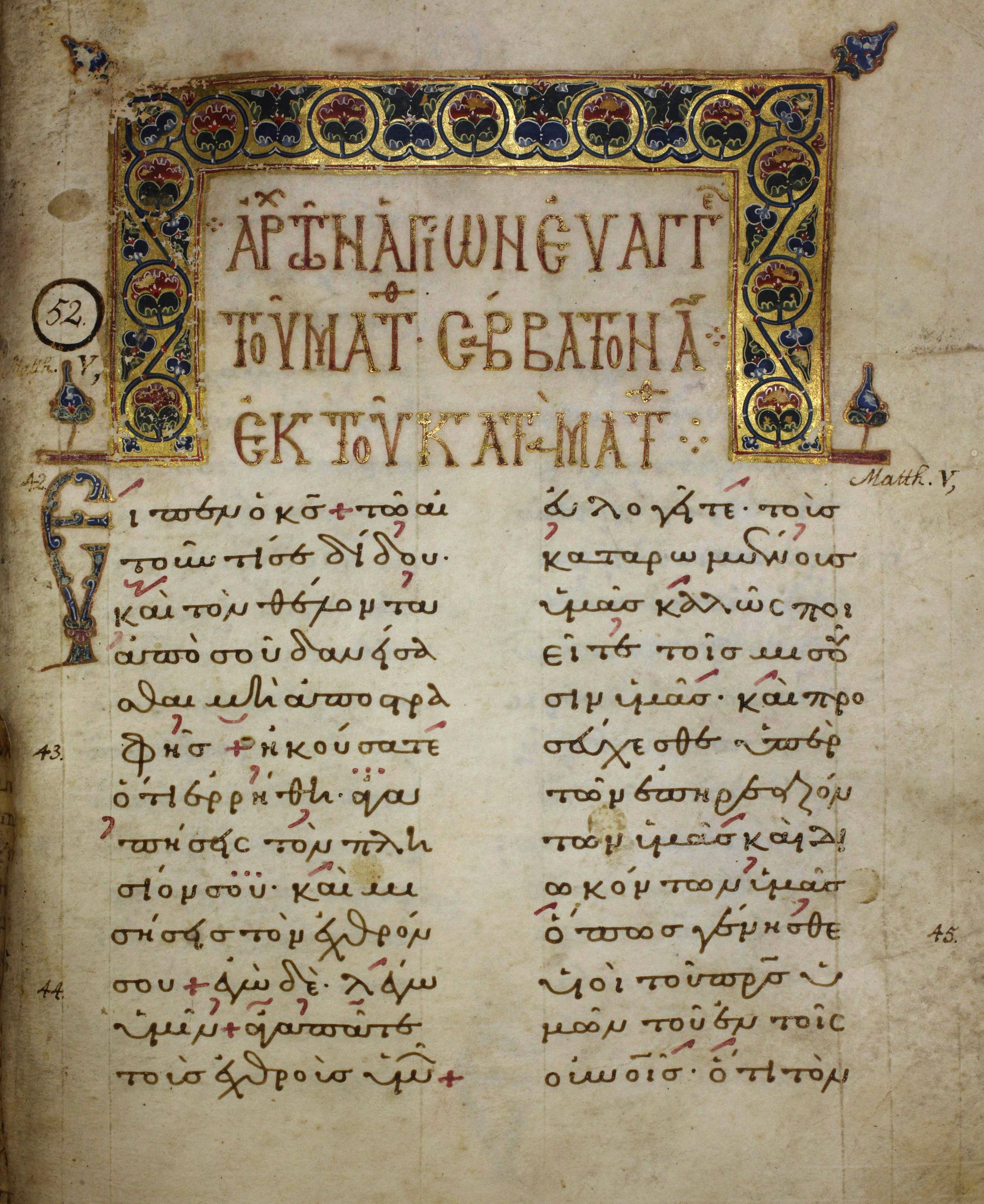
The Greek text of Matthew 5:42-45 with a decorated headpiece in Folio 51 recto of Lectionary 240 (12th century)

In the King James Version of the Bible the text reads:

But I say unto you, Love your enemies, bless them that curse you, do good to them that hate you, and pray for them which despitefully use you, and persecute you;

The World English Bible translates the passage as:

But I tell you, love your enemies, bless those who curse you, do good to those who hate you, and pray for those who mistreat you and persecute you,

The Novum Testamentum Graece text is:

ἐγὼ δὲ λέγω ὑμῖν, ἀγαπᾶτε τοὺς ἐχθροὺς ὑμῶν
καὶ προσεύχεσθε ὑπὲρ τῶν διωκόντων ὑμᾶς

The Nova Vulgata text is:

Ego autem dico vobis: Diligite inimicos vestros et orate pro persequentibus vos,

Many modern translations (following the Alexandrian manuscripts) omit part of this verse. For example, the New International Version reads: "But I tell you, love your enemies and pray for those who persecute you".

== Precursors ==
Ulrich Luz states that the ideas expressed in this verse are "considered the Christian distinction and innovation", and that the commandment to "Love thy enemies" is what separates Christianity from all earlier religions. John Nolland disagrees with this, seeing a number of historical precedents. These include the second millennium BCE Babylonian text Counsels of Wisdom, which says "Do not return evil to the man who disputes with you; requite with kindness your evil-doer... smile on your adversary." Nolland also cites the Egyptian Instruction of Amenemope (14th-11th centuries BCE), which says:

Row that we may ferry the evil man away,
For we will not act according to his evil nature;
Lift him up, give him your hand,
And leave him [in] the hands of god;
Fill his gut with your own food
That he may be sated and ashamed.

Similarly, the Book of Proverbs says:

If your enemies are hungry, give them bread to eat;
and if they are thirsty, give them water to drink.

Nolland claims that parallels should be seen in the works of Greek and Roman writers such as Cicero, Seneca, and the Cynics, amongst other examples from the ancient world. Calvinist theologian John Piper reports that the Greek Stoics also discouraged their followers from retaliating, but Piper states that they were concerned primarily with maintaining their tranquility, rather than seeking the benefit of the enemy, as Jesus commands. The community rules from the Qumran (1QS 10.17–18) also state "I shall not repay anyone with an evil reward, with goodness I shall purse the man."

== Historical context ==
"Enemies" is a broad term for all manner of foes and adversaries. In this verse, persecutors are specifically mentioned; at the time of its writing (approximately the last quarter of the 1st century), the Christian community had recently faced considerable persecution under Nero. The entire Jewish community at both the time of Jesus and the latter 1st century had been subject to persecution by the Romans (see History of the Jews in the Roman Empire, Persecution of Christians in the New Testament, and Anti-Christian policies in the Roman Empire).

== Interpretations ==
=== Love ===
The meaning of the word love is more restricted in Greek than in English. Barclay notes that Greek had four different words that are normally translated as love. The Greek words for love for a family member, stergein; sexual love, eros; and deep affection, philia; are not used in this verse. Rather the author of Matthew uses agapan, which Barclay translates as continued benevolence. This term occurs seven more times in Matthew, and 140 times in the NT.

== Reception ==
=== Christian tradition ===
The author of Matthew places this verse in the final antithesis, a summary of all that been stated in the Sermon. Early church thinkers also saw this as one of Jesus' most important teachings.

=== Activists and social theorists ===
The German philosopher Friedrich Nietzsche argued in his treatise On the Genealogy of Morality (1887) that the supposed love of enemies was just a way to mask the fact that early Christians were too weak to defeat their enemies, and thus had to pretend this inability was a product of virtue rather than impotence (see Master–slave morality); He cites Christians' belief that their opponents and persecutors deserve to go to hell as proof they do not actually believe in loving their enemies. In Twilight of the Idols, he reiterates his charge of hypocrisy against the Christians, remarking that "in every age, the Church wanted its enemies destroyed". By contrast, he believes that truly great people neither love nor hate their enemies, but are wholly indifferent towards them, claiming "an inability to take seriously for any length of time their enemies, their disasters, their misdeeds, that is the sign of the full strong nature"; he cites the example of Count Mirabeau, who had "no memories for any insults and meannesses which were practiced on him" and "was only incapable of forgiving because he forgot".

Gene Sharp believed that it is not necessary for activists to express love for their opponents or to convert these opponents to their perspective in order for activists to achieve their desired policy changes. Instead, Sharp followed James Farmer in emphasizing that through nonviolent tactics, those in power can be forced by public pressure to concede to popular demands. Martin Luther King said of this passage: "It's so basic to me because it is a part of my basic philosophical and theological orientation—the whole idea of love, the whole philosophy of love."

== Commentary from the Church Fathers ==
Glossa Ordinaria: "The Lord has taught above that we must not resist one who offers any injury, but must be ready even to suffer more; He now further requires us to show to them that do us wrong both love and its effects. And as the things that have gone before pertain to the completion of the righteousness of the Law, in like manner this last precept is to be referred to the completion of the law of love, which, according to the Apostle, is the fulfilling of the Law."

Augustine: "That by the command, Thou shalt love thy neighbour, all mankind were intended, the Lord showed in the parable of the man who was left half dead, which teaches us that our neighbour is every one who may happen at any time to stand in need of our offices of mercy; and this who does not see must be denied to none, when the Lord says, Do good to them that hate you."

Augustine: "That there were degrees in the righteousness of the Pharisees which was under the old Law is seen herein, that many hated even those by whom they were loved. He therefore who loves his neighbour, has ascended one degree, though as yet he hate his enemy; which is expressed in that, and shalt hate his enemy; which is not to be understood as a command to the justified, but a concession to the weak."

Glossa Ordinaria: "But it should be known, that in the whole body of the Law it is no where written, Thou shalt hate thy enemy. But it is to be referred to the tradition of the Scribes, who thought good to add this to the Law, because the Lord bade the children of Israel pursue their enemies, and destroy Amalek from under heaven."

Pseudo-Chrysostom: "As that, Thou shalt not lust, was not spoken to the flesh, but to the spirit, so in this the flesh indeed is not able to love its enemy, but the spirit is able; for the love and hate of the flesh is in the sense, but of the spirit is in the understanding. If then we feel hate to one who has wronged us, and yet will not to act upon that feeling, know that our flesh hates our enemy, but our soul loves him."

Gregory the Great: "Love to an enemy is then observed when we are not sorrowful at his success, or rejoice in his fall. We hate him whom we wish not to be bettered, and pursue with ill-wishes the prosperity of the man in whose fall we rejoice. Yet it may often happen that without any sacrifice of charity, the fall of an enemy may gladden us, and again his exaltation make us sorrowful without any suspicion of envy; when, namely, by his fall any deserving man is raised up, or by his success any undeservedly depressed. But herein a strict measure of discernment must be observed, lest in following out our own hates, we hide it from ourselves under the specious pretence of others' benefit. We should balance how much we owe to the fall of the sinner, how much to the justice of the Judge. For when the Almighty has struck any hardened sinner, we must at once magnify His justice as Judge, and feel with the other's suffering who perishes."

Glossa Ordinaria: "They who stand against the Church oppose her in three ways; with hate, with words, and with bodily tortures. The Church on the other hand loves them, as it is here, Love your enemies; does good to them, as it is, Do good to them that hate you; and prays for them, as it is, Pray for them that persecute you and accuse you falsely."

Jerome: "Many measuring the commandments of God by their own weakness, not by the strength of the saints, hold these commands for impossible, and say that it is virtue enough not to hate our enemies; but to love them is a command beyond human nature to obey. But it must be understood that Christ enjoins not impossibilities but perfection. Such was the temper of David towards Saul and Absalom; the Martyr Stephen also prayed for his enemies while they stoned him, and Paul wished himself anathema for the sake of his persecutors. (Rom. 9:3.) Jesus both taught and did the same, saying, Father, forgive them, for they know not what they do. (Luke 23:34.)"

Augustine: "These indeed are examples of the perfect sons of God; yet to this should every believer aim, and seek by prayer to God, and struggles with himself to raise his human spirit to this temper. Yet this so great blessing is not given to all those multitudes which we believe are heard when they pray, Forgive us our debts, as we forgive our debtors."

== See also ==
- Christian pacifism
- Golden rule
- Tolstoyan movement

| Preceded by Matthew 5:43 | Gospel of Matthew Chapter 5 | Succeeded by Matthew 5:45 |
