= Parable of the Two Sons =

Parable taught by Jesus of Nazareth according to the Christian Gospel of Matthew

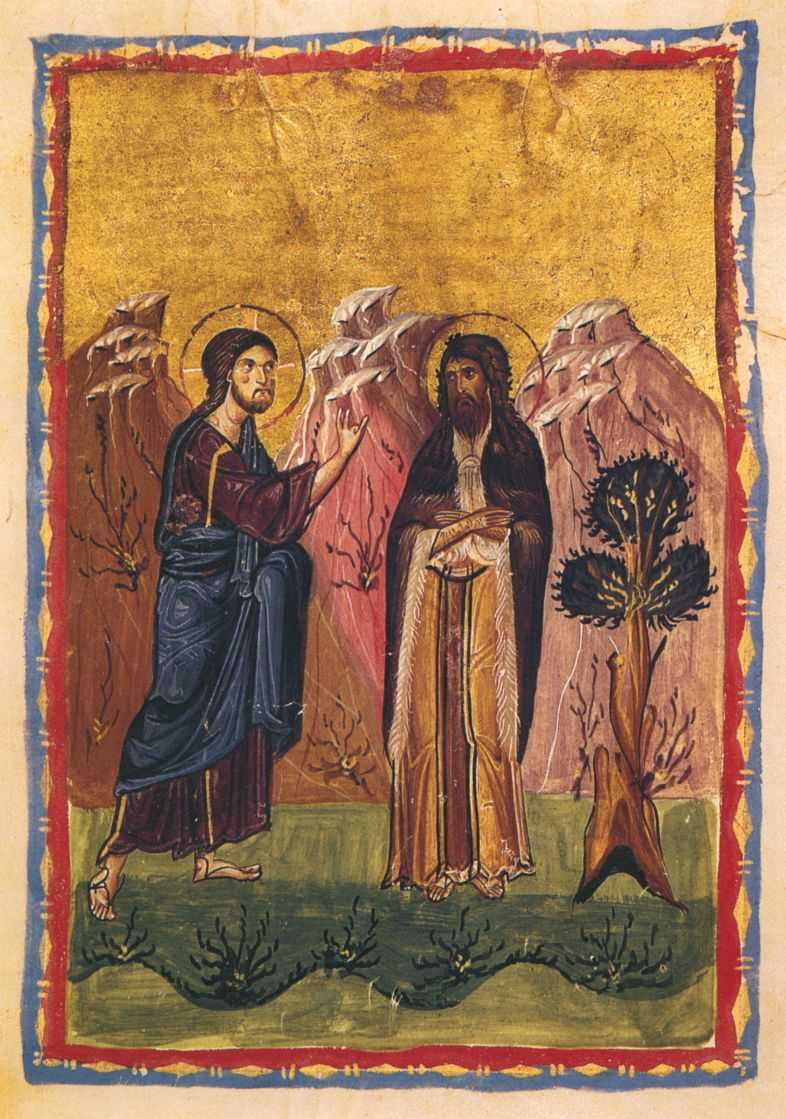
Jesus and John the Baptist (15th century)

The Parable of the Two Sons is a parable told by Jesus in the New Testament, found in Matthew's Gospel. It contrasts the tax collectors and prostitutes who accepted the message taught by John the Baptist with the ostensibly religious people who did not.

== Summary ==
A man with two sons asks both of them to go work that day in his vineyard. The first one said he wouldn't do it at first, but then he did it anyway. The second son initially said that he would do it, but then he didn't.

== Narrative in Matthew's Gospel ==
In the Gospel of Matthew, the parable is as follows:

What do you think? A certain man had two sons. He came to the first and said, 'Son, go work today in my vineyard.' He answered and said 'I will not'. But later, he changed his mind and went. He came to the second and said likewise. He answered and said, 'I am going, sir', and went not. Which of the two did his father's will?" They said: "The first". Jesus said to them, "Verily I say unto you, the publicans and the harlots are entering the kingdom of God ahead of you. For John came to you to show you the way of righteousness, and you did not believe him, but the tax collectors and the prostitutes did. And even after you saw this, you did not repent and believe him. — Matthew 21:28-32.

== Interpretation ==
In this parable, Jesus reproved those who considered themselves virtuous; whereas those whom they considered sinners, such as the tax collectors and prostitutes, were accepting the message of John the Baptist and repenting. The parable of the Pharisee and the Publican has a similar theme.

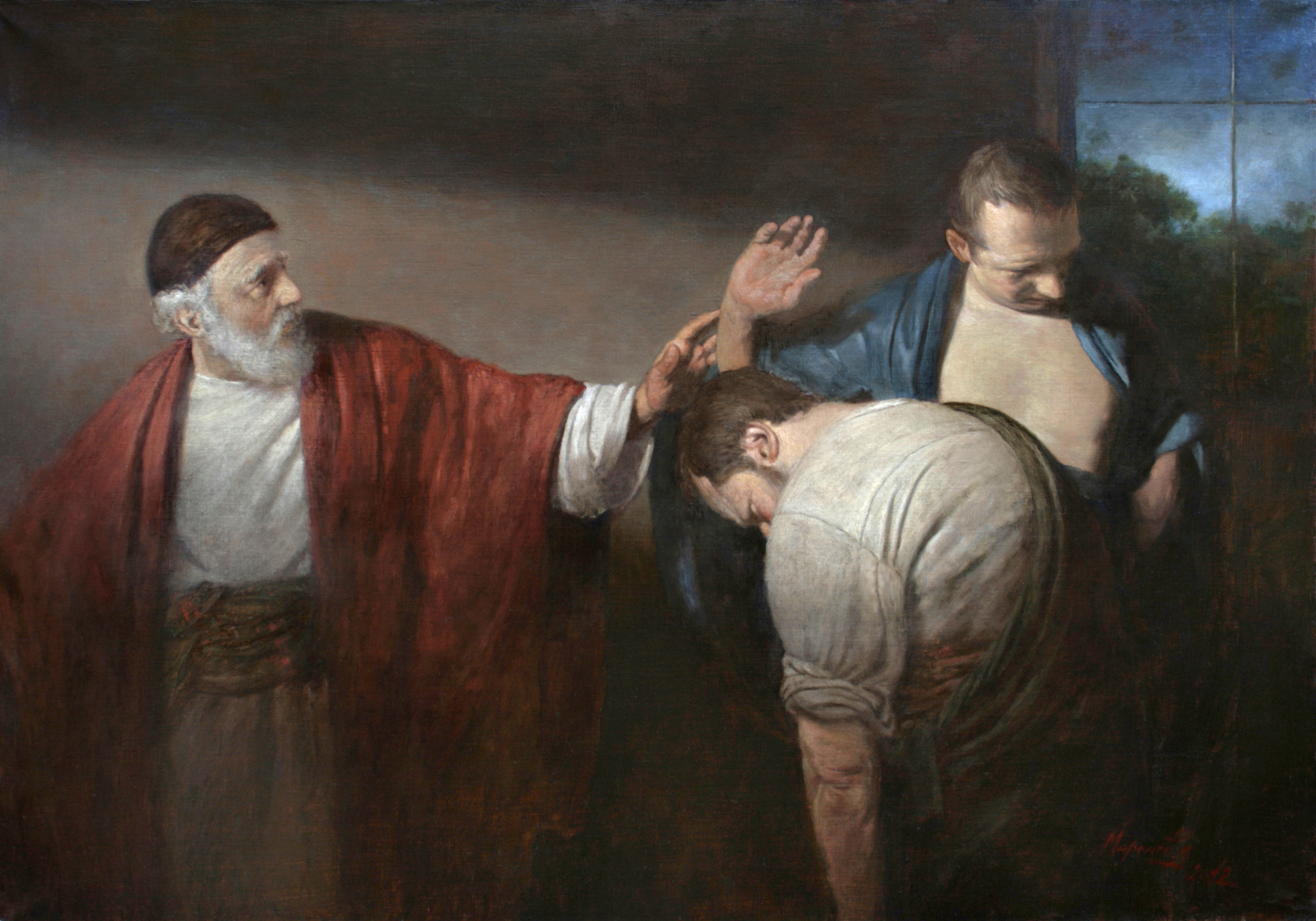
Parable of the two sons: painting by Andrei Mironov

Cornelius a Lapide observes in his Great Commentary that "This parable scarcely needs an explanation, because Christ applies and explains it. In truth, the first—being at the beginning unwilling to obey his father, but afterwards repenting and obeying, by going to work in the vineyard—denotes the publicans and harlots; who at first by their sins repelled the will and law of God, but afterwards by John's preaching came to a better mind, and did penance, and lived chastely and justly, according to the law of God. The second son—who said to his father that he would go into the vineyard, but broke his word, and went not—denotes the Scribes and Pharisees; who always had the law of God in their mouths (as though they were most zealous and religious observers of it), but did not fulfil it in their deeds, but by lust, rapine, and usury acted contrary to it. Wherefore they provoked the heavy displeasure and anger of God against them, as well on account of their wickedness itself as because of their hypocrisy and feigned observance of the Law. For such hypocrisy and duplicity grievously provokes God."

Verna Holyhead notes that both the tax collectors and the prostitutes were despised by the Jewish religious leaders because of their connections with the Roman occupation: the tax collectors supported the imperial tax system, and many of the prostitutes' sexual clients would have been Roman soldiers.
