= Herodians =

Sect of Hellenistic Jews

The Herodians (Greek: Ἡρώδειοι; Latin: Herodiani) were a sect of Hellenistic Jews mentioned in the New Testament on two occasions – first in Galilee and later in Jerusalem – being hostile to Jesus (Mark 3:6, 12:13; Matthew 22:16; cf. also Mark 8:15, Luke 13:31–32). In each of these cases their name is coupled with that of the Pharisees.

According to many interpreters, the courtiers or soldiers of Herod Antipas ("Milites Herodis," Jerome) were intended; others argue that the Herodians were probably a public political party who distinguished themselves from the two great historical parties of post-exilic Judaism (the Pharisees and Sadducees) by the fact that they were and had been sincerely friendly to Herod the Great, the Edomite placed as king over Judea by Rome, and to his dynasty.

== Overview ==
The Herodians are often mentioned in the Gospels at the same time as the Pharisees. Like the Pharisees, the Herodians wanted political independence for the Jewish people. Unlike the Pharisees, who sought to restore the kingdom of David, the Herodians wished to restore a member of the Herodian dynasty to the throne in Judea.

Anglican bishop Charles Ellicott notes a consistency in format with other designations such as "Mariani (supporters of Gaius Marius), Pompeiani (relating to Pompey the Great), and, we may add, Christiani". It is possible that to gain adherents the Herodian party may have been in the habit of representing that the establishment of a Herodian dynasty would be favourable to the realization of the theocracy; and this in turn may account for Pseudo-Tertullian's (Adversis Omnes Haereses [1,1]) allegation that the Herodians regarded Herod as the Messiah. The sect was called by the rabbis Boethusians as being friendly to the family of Boethus, whose daughter Mariamne was one of Herod the Great's wives.

Robert Eisenman of California State University, Long Beach argues that Paul the Apostle was a member of the family of Herod the Great. Eisenman makes a connection between Paul and an individual identified by Josephus as "Saulus," a "kinsman of Agrippa." Another oft-cited element of the case for Paul as a member of Herod's family is found in Romans 16:11 where Paul writes, "Greet Herodion, my kinsman."

Some people think that the Herodians was another name for the Essenes who probably wrote the Dead Sea Scrolls. "Nothing is known of them beyond what the Gospels state," and "... their precise relation to the other sects or schools among the Jews are consequently matters of conjecture."

Josephus' Antiquities of the Jews (Book 15 Chapter 10.5) states "5. Now there was one of these Essens [sic], whose name was Manahem, who had this testimony, that he not only conducted his life after an excellent manner, but had the foreknowledge of future events given him by God also. This man once saw Herod when he was a child, and going to school, and saluted him as king of the Jews; but he, thinking that either he did not know him, or that he was in jest, put him in mind that he was but a private man; but Manahem smiled to himself, and clapped him on his backside with his hand, and said," However that be, thou wilt be king, and wilt begin thy reign happily, for God finds thee worthy of it. And do thou remember the blows that Manahem hath given thee, as being a signal of the change of thy fortune. And truly this will be the best reasoning for thee, that thou love justice [towards men], and piety towards God, and clemency towards thy citizens; yet do I know how thy whole conduct will be, that thou wilt not be such a one, for thou wilt excel all men in happiness, and obtain an everlasting reputation, but wilt forget piety and righteousness; and these crimes will not be concealed from God, at the conclusion of thy life, when thou wilt find that he will be mindful of them, and punish thee for them." Now at that time Herod did not at all attend to what Manahem said, as having no hopes of such advancement; but a little afterward, when he was so fortunate as to be advanced to the dignity of king, and was in the height of his dominion, he sent for Manahem, and asked him how long he should reign. Manahem did not tell him the full length of his reign; wherefore, upon that silence of his, he asked him further, whether he should reign ten years or not? He replied, "Yes, twenty, nay, thirty years;" but did not assign the just determinate limit of his reign. Herod was satisfied with these replies, and gave Manahem his hand, and dismissed him; and from that time he continued to honor all the Essens [sic]. We have thought it proper to relate these facts to our readers, how strange soever they be, and to declare what hath happened among us, because many of these Essens [sic] have, by their excellent virtue, been thought worthy of this knowledge of Divine revelations."

Josephus said Herod "continued to honor all the Essenes." The people could have thought that the Essenes were Herod's pet and called them the Herodians.
