= George Maclear =

British academic (1833–1902)

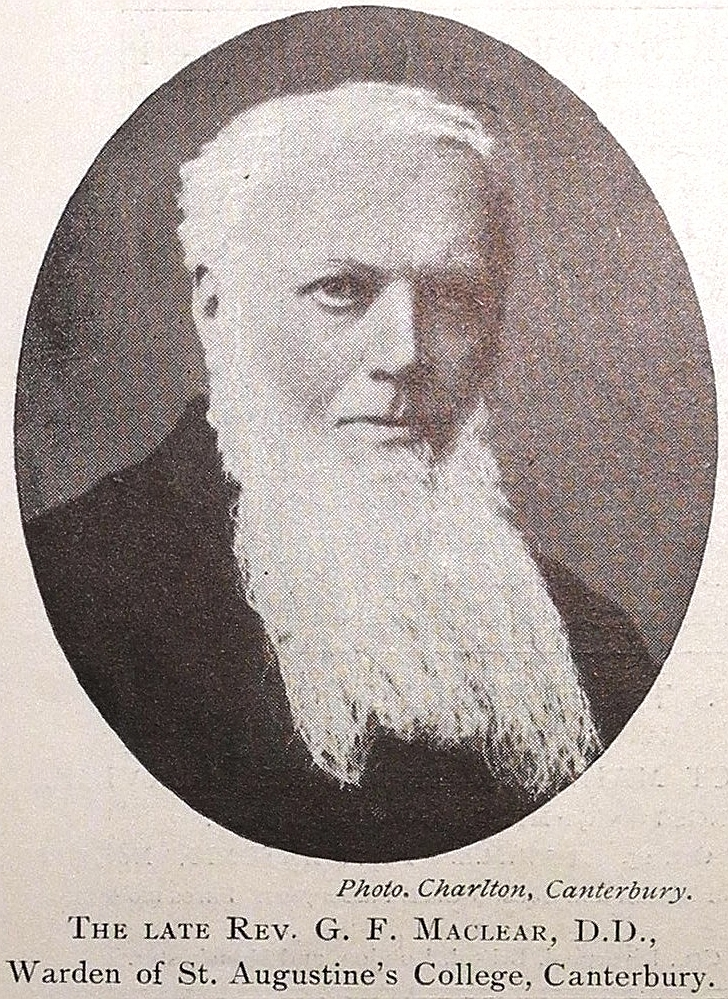
George Frederick Maclear

George Frederick Maclear (3 February 1833 in Bedford - 19 October 1902 at St Augustine's College, Canterbury) was an English clergyman, theological writer and headmaster at King's College School, London (later Wimbledon). He was the eldest son of the Rev. George Maclear, MA, chaplain of Bedford county prison (1832–69), by his wife Isabella Ingle. Educated at Bedford School, he obtained a scholarship at Trinity College, Cambridge in 1852, receiving a BA degree in 1855, followed by a distinguished academic career. He was the nephew of Thomas Maclear, Her Majesty's Astronomer at Cape Town, and cousin to John Maclear, admiral in the Royal Navy, and Basil Maclear.

== Career ==
Maclear won the Carus Greek Testament prize in 1854 and 1855, and after graduating BA with a second class in the classical tripos of 1855, he was placed in the first class in the theological tripos of 1856 (its first year). He gained the Burney prize in 1856, the Hulsean in 1857, the Maitland in 1858 and 1861, and the Norrisian in 1863. All five prize essays were published. His Maitland essay of 1858, The Christian Statesman and our Indian Empire; or the legitimate sphere of government countenance and aid in promoting Christianity in India, reached a second edition. The Maitland essay of 1861, on Christian Missions during the Middle Ages, was recast as Apostles of Medieval Europe (1869), and was the first of a series of volumes on missionary history. Maclear proceeded MA in 1860, BD in 1867, and DD in 1872. Ordained deacon in 1856 and priest in 1857, he held curacies at Clopton, Bedfordshire (1856-8), and St. Barnabas, Kennington (1858–60); was assistant-preacher at Curzon Chapel, Mayfair (1860-5); and reader at the Temple (1865–70); select preacher at Cambridge in 1868, 1880, and 1886, and at Oxford in 1881-2; and Ramsden preacher at Cambridge in 1890. He delivered the Boyle lectures at Whitehall in 1879-80, The Evidential Value of the Holy Eucharist (1883; 4th edit. 1898).

Meanwhile, Maclear was an assistant master at King's College School, London (1860–1866), and headmaster (1867–1880). He doubled the numbers and greatly raised the standing of the school. While headmaster he declined an offer of the see of Colombo in 1875. Eventually he accepted the post of warden of St. Augustine's Missionary College, Canterbury, in 1880, and held it til his death. In this capacity he worked as preacher, lecturer, and adviser on foreign mission work. In 1885 he was made an honorary Canon of Canterbury Cathedral. He died at St. Augustine's College, after a long illness, on 19 October 1902, and was buried in St Martin's churchyard, Canterbury.

== Family ==
Maclear was married twice: (1) on 10 June 1857 to Christiana Susan, daughter of J. Campbell, rector of Eye, Suffolk (she died on 31 May 1874, being predeceased by an only daughter); and (2) on 27 December 1878 to Eva, eldest daughter of William Henry D'Olier Purcell, vicar of Exmouth; she died on 1 March 1890, leaving three sons and a daughter.

== Legacy ==
Maclear enjoyed a wide reputation as a theological writer. His text-books, which were long in general use, include the Class Books of Old and New Testament History (1862), the Class Book of the Catechism (1868), An Introduction to the Articles (written with the Rev. Watkin Wynn Williams) (1895; new ed. 1909). To missionary history he contributed The Conversion of the West (4 vols 1878) and St Augustine's, Canterbury: its Rise, Ruin and Restoration (1888); and he wrote on missions in the Encyclopædia Britannica (9th ed). Maclear also published, with several devotional books, An Elementary Introduction to the Book of Common Prayer (1868) and The Baptismal Office and the Order of Confirmation (1902), in both of which he collaborated with Francis Procter; he edited portions of the Cambridge Bible for Schools; and contributed to Smith's Dictionaries of Christian Antiquities and Christian Biography, and to Cassell's Bible Educator. Lectures on Pastoral Theology, a selection from his unpublished manuscripts, was edited by the Rev. R.J.E. Boggis, DD, in 1904.

'Maclear house' at King's College School is named after George for his service as headmaster 1866-1880.

== List of Publications ==
- Incentives to Virtue Natural and Revealed, Burney Prize Essay of 1856 (Macmillan, 1857)
- The Cross and the Nations, or the adaptation of Christianity to the human mind, as illustrated by the intellectual characters, respectively, of the Greek and the Latin churches Hulsean Prize Essay of 1857 (Macmillan & Co, 1858)
- The Christian Statesman and Our Indian Empire, Maitland Prize Essay of 1858 (Macmillan & Co, 1859)
- An Elementary Introduction to the Book of Common Prayer, with Rev. Francis Proctor M.A., Vicar of Witton, Norfolk (Macmillan & Co, 1862)
- A History of Christian Missions During the Middle Ages (1863), republished as Apostles of Mediæval Europe (Macmillan & Co, 1869), then Missions and Apostles of Mediaeval Europe (The Macmillan Company, 1897)
- The Witness of the Eucharist or The Institution and Early Celebration of the Lord's Supper, Norisian Prize Essay of 1863 (Macmillan & Co, 1864)
- A Class-Book of Old Testament History (Macmillan & Co, 1865)
- A Class-Book of New Testament History (Macmillan & Co, 1866)
- A Shilling Book of Old Testament History for National and Elementary Schools: With a Map of the Holy Land (Macmillan & Co, 1866)
- A Shilling Book of New Testament History for National and Elementary Schools: With a Map to Illustrate the Apostolic History (Macmillan & Co, 1867)
- A Class-book of the Catechism of the Church of England (Macmillan & Co, 1868)
- A Manual of Instruction for Confirmation and First Communion, with Prayers and Devotions (1874)
- The Order of Confirmation: With Prayers and Devotions (Macmillan & Co, 1874)
- The Gradual Conversion of Europe: A Paper Read at the Annual Meeting of the Society for the Propagation of the Gospel in Foreign Parts, April 28, 1875 (Clay, 1875)
- The Hour of Sorrow, or the Office for the Burial of the Dead: With Prayers and Hymns (Macmillan & Co, 1875)
- Conversion of the West: the Northmen (Society for Promoting Christian Knowledge, 1878)
- Conversion of the West: the Slavs (Society for Promoting Christian Knowledge, 1879)
- The Book of Joshua: with Notes, Maps, and Introduction (Cambridge U. P, 1880)
- The Evidential Value of the Holy Eucharist: Being the Boyle Lectures for 1879, 1880, Delivered in the Chapel Royal, Whitehall (Macmillan & Co, 1883)
- Conversion of the West: the English (E&JB Young & Co, 1883)
- S. Augustine's Canterbury: Its Rise, Ruin, and Restoration (1888)
- The Gospel According to St Mark: with Maps, Notes and Introduction (Cambridge U. P, 1889), reproduced (without the maps) by Bible Hub Online Parallel Bible.
- An Introduction to the Creeds (Macmillan & Co, 1889)
- Conversion of the West: the Celts (Society for Promoting Christian Knowledge, 1893)
- First Communion With Prayers and Devotions for The Newly Confirmed (Macmillan & Co, 1894)
- An Introduction to the Articles of the Church of England (Macmillan & Co, 1895)
- The Baptismal Office and the Order of Confirmation with Francis Procter (Macmillan & Co, 1902)
- Lectures on Pastoral Theology (Cross & Jackman, 1904)
