= Great Commandment =

First of two commandments cited by Jesus

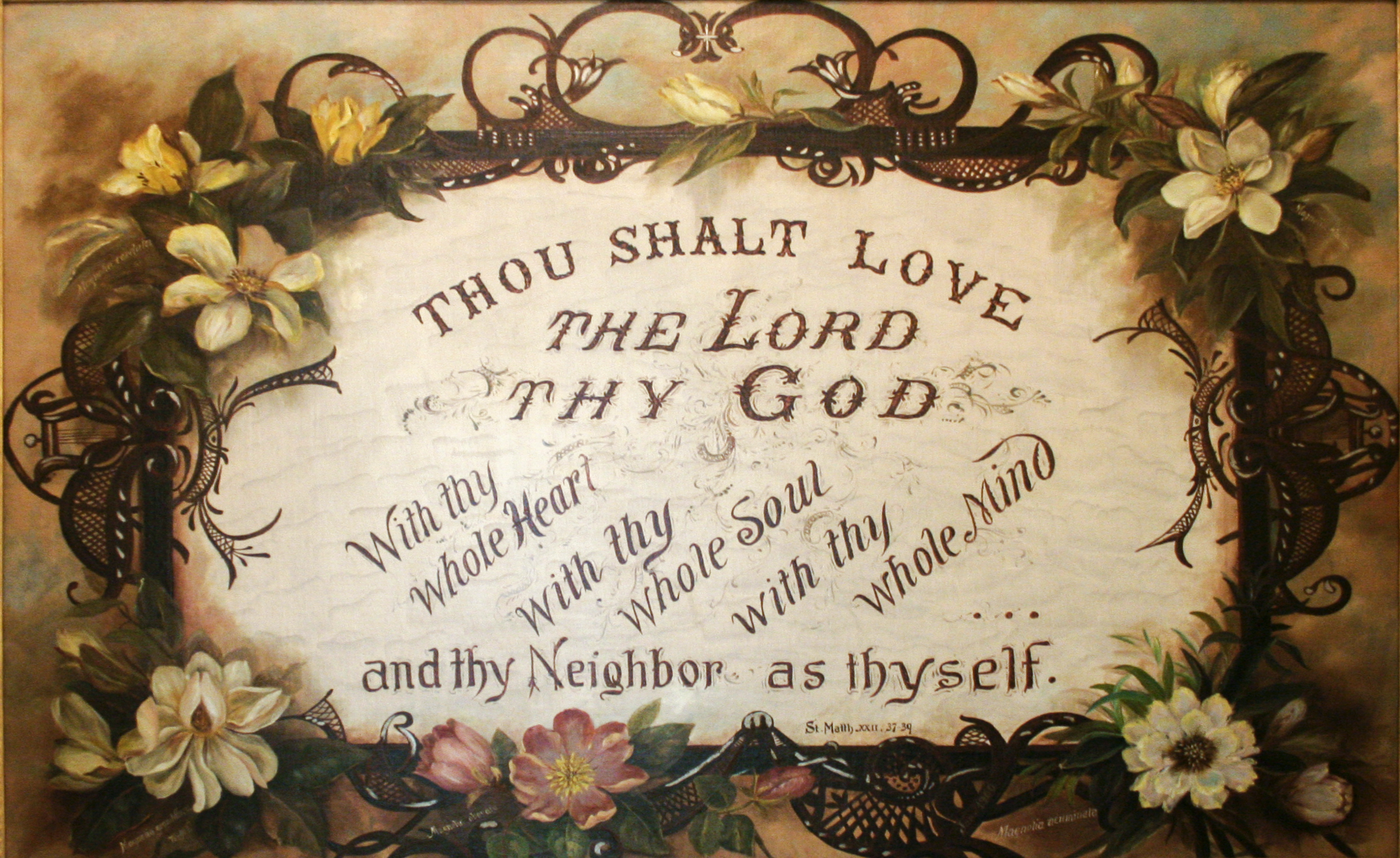
An art piece depicting the Great Commandment

The Great Commandment (or Greatest Commandment) (Note: Although most English versions of the Bible use the word "great", (from the Greek feminine μεγάλη big, great) a few versions change the word to "greatest". See multi-version comparison of Matthew 22:36.) is a name used in the New Testament to describe the first of two commandments cited by Jesus in Matthew 22 (Matthew 22:35–40), Mark 12 (Mark 12:28–34), and in answer to him in Luke 10 (Luke 10:27),

According to Jesus of Nazareth, the first and greatest commandment is that "the Lord is our God, the Lord is one."

According to Mark 12 (Mark 12:28–34) in full answer of the which commandment is first:

One of the scribes came near and heard them disputing with one another, and seeing that he answered them well, he asked him,

"Which commandment is the first of all?"

Jesus answered,

"The first is, 'Hear, O Israel: the Lord is our God, the Lord is one; you shall love the Lord your God with all your heart, and with all your soul, and with all your mind, and with all your strength.'

The second is this, 'You shall love your neighbor as yourself.'

There is no other commandment greater than these.'"

— Mark 12:28–31

Both the first and second commandments came from the Old Testament and meant to be obeyed by Jews and followers of Jesus.

... and one of them, a lawyer, asked him a question to test him. "Teacher, which commandment in the law is the greatest?" He [Jesus] said to him, "'You shall love the Lord your God with all your heart, and with all your soul, and with all your mind.' This is the greatest and first commandment. And a second is like it: 'You shall love your neighbor as yourself.' On these two commandments hang all the law and the prophets."

— Matthew 22:35–40

Most Christian denominations hold that these two commandments, taken together, form the core of the Christian religion.

== New Testament accounts ==
=== Gospel of Matthew ===
... and one of them, a lawyer, asked him a question to test him. "Teacher, which commandment in the law is the greatest?" He said to him, "'You shall love the Lord your God with all your heart, and with all your soul, and with all your mind.' This is the greatest and first commandment. And a second is like it: 'You shall love your neighbor as yourself.' On these two commandments hang all the law and the prophets."

— Matthew 22:35–40

=== Gospel of Mark ===
In the Gospel of Mark, the first verse of the Shema Yisrael (which the first part of the Great Commandment refers to) is included:

One of the scribes came near and heard them disputing with one another, and seeing that he answered them well, he asked him, "Which commandment is the first of all?" Jesus answered, "The first is, 'Hear, O Israel: the Lord is God, the Lord is one; you shall love the Lord your God with all your heart, and with all your soul, and with all your mind, and with all your strength.' The second is this, 'You shall love your neighbor as yourself.' There is no other commandment greater than these.'"

— Mark 12:28–31

=== Gospel of Luke ===
Just then a lawyer stood up to test Jesus. "Teacher," he said, "what must I do to inherit eternal life?" He said to him, "What is written in the law? What do you read there?" He answered, "You shall love the Lord your God with all your heart, and with all your soul, and with all your strength, and with all your mind; and your neighbor as yourself." And he said to him, "You have given the right answer; do this, and you will live."

— Luke 10:25–28

== Old Testament reference ==
=== Deuteronomy ===
^{4} Hear, O Israel: The Lord is our God, the Lord is One. ^{5} You shall love the Lord your God with all your heart, and with all your soul, and with all your might.

— Deuteronomy 6:4–5

Leviticus

^{18} You shall not take vengeance or bear a grudge against any of your people, but you shall love your neighbor as yourself: I am the Lord.

— Leviticus 19:18

== Love the Lord your God ==
Matthew Henry sums up the question of which is the great commandment:

It was a question disputed among the critics in the Law. Some would have the Law of Circumcision to be the Great Commandment, others the Law of the Sabbath, others the Law of Sacrifices, according as they severally stood affected, and spent their zeal; now they would try what Christ said to this question, hoping to incense the people against him, if he should not answer according to the vulgar opinion; and if he should magnify one commandment, they would reflect on him as vilifying the rest.

Adam Clarke, in his Commentary on the Bible, wrote:

This is the first and great commandment. It is "first and greatest":

1. In its antiquity; being as old as the world, and engraved originally on our very nature.
2. In its dignity; as directly and immediately proceeding from and referring to God.
3. In its excellence; being the commandment of the new covenant, and the very spirit of the Divine adoption.
4. In its justice; because it alone renders to God His due, prefers Him before all things, and secures to Him His proper rank in relation to them.
5. In its sufficiency; being in itself capable of making men holy in this life, and happy in the other.
6. In its fruitfulness; because it is the root of all commandments, and the fulfilling of the law.
7. In its virtue and efficacy; because by this alone God reigns in the heart of humans, and humans are united to God.
8. In its extent; leaving nothing to the creature, which it does not refer to the Creator.
9. In its necessity; being absolutely indispensable.
10. In its duration; ever to be continued on earth, and never to be discontinued in heaven.

"Thou shalt love the Lord thy God" is interpreted by Rabbi Adin Even-Israel Steinsaltz to mean "Act in such a manner that God will be beloved by all His creatures." Consequently, Israel, being, as the priest-people, enjoined like the Aaronite priest to sanctify the name of God and avoid whatever tends to desecrate it (Lev. xxii. 32), is not only obliged to give his life as witness or martyr for the maintenance of the true faith (see Isa. xliii. 12, μάρτυρες; and Pesik. 102b; Sifra, Emor, ix.), but so to conduct himself in every way as to prevent the name of God from being dishonored by non-Israelites.

Twice every day (during Shacharit and Maariv, the morning and evening prayers) observant Jews recite the Shema Yisrael, which contains the words: "Thou shalt love the Lord thy God with all thine heart, with all thy soul, and with all thy might" (Deut. vi. 5). This verse is interpreted by Rabbi Even-Israel Steinsaltz to enjoin him to willingly surrender life and fortune whenever the cause of God demands it, while it at the same time urges him to make God beloved by all his creatures through deeds of kindness, as Abraham did (Sifre, Deut. 32).

Although only asked about the first commandment, Jesus included the second commandment in his answer. This double reference has given rise to differing views with regard to the relationship that exists between the two commandments, although typically "love thy God" is referred to as "the first and greatest commandment", with "love thy neighbor" being referred to as "the second great commandment". It may simply reflect the "seven rules (Middot) of Hillel", in this case the first one, called Ḳal wa-ḥomer (Hebrew: קל וחומר).

Most Christian denominations view the Great Commandment alongside the law to love one's neighbor as forming the core of the Christian religion. The second passage is considered to be a form of the Golden Rule.

== See also ==
- Christian–Jewish reconciliation
- Christianity and Judaism
- Judeo-Christian
- Law of Christ
- New Commandment
- Ten Commandments
