= Matthew 5:39 =

- ← 5:38 5:40 →
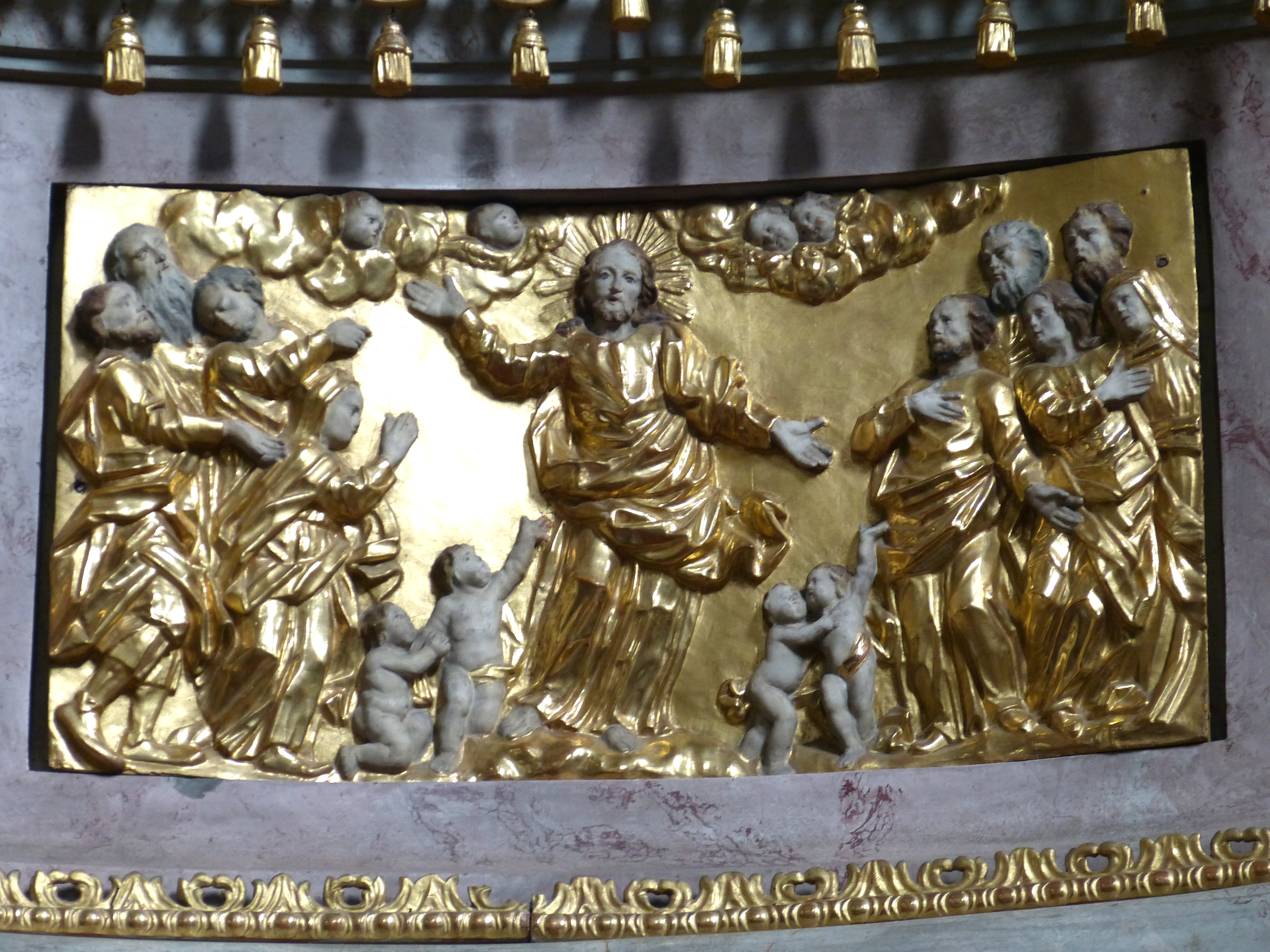
- "Sermon on the Mount". Pulpit relief (1721) at Parish church of the Assumption, Waidhofen an der Thaya (Lower Austria).
- Book: Gospel of Matthew
- Christian Bible part: New Testament

Matthew 5:39 is the thirty-ninth verse of the fifth chapter of the Gospel of Matthew in the New Testament and is part of the Sermon on the Mount. This is the second verse of the antithesis on the command: "eye for an eye". In one of the most famous verses in the New Testament, Jesus here rejects revenge and retaliation, instead telling his followers to turn the other cheek.

== Content ==
In the King James Version (KJV) of the Bible the text reads:

But I say unto you, That ye resist not evil:
but whosoever shall smite thee on thy right
cheek, turn to him the other also.

The World English Bible (WEB) translates the passage as:

But I tell you, don't resist him who is evil;
but whoever strikes you on your right
cheek, turn to him the other also.

The Novum Testamentum Graece text is:

ἐγὼ δὲ λέγω ὑμῖν μὴ ἀντιστῆναι τῷ πονηρῷ
ἀλλ’ ὅστις σε ῥαπίζει εἰς τὴν δεξιὰν σιαγόνα σου,
στρέψον αὐτῷ καὶ τὴν ἄλλην

== Analysis ==
This verse opens with the standard "but I say unto you" phrase that heralds a reinterpretation of Mosaic Law. While the Old Testament quote in the previous verse was a reference to retributive punishment, here Jesus uses the word resist, which has been seen as far broader. This verse is often presented as advocating radical pacifism.

R. T. France rejects this view. He notes that the word translated as resist, anthistemi, has a far more restricted meaning in the original Greek. The word translates more accurately as "do not resist by legal means". Schweizer notes that this is how the word is used in Deuteronomy 19:18 and Isaiah 50:8. To France, and many other scholars, this verse is just one part of a discussion of legal principles, similar to the previous and subsequent verses. The interpretation as a general rule of non-violent resistance is a misunderstanding of the original. For a full discussion of the debate and history of the phrase, see turn the other cheek.

Striking on the right cheek refers to a back-handed slap to the face. In Jesus's time, and still today in the Middle East, such a gesture is one of the highest forms of contempt. According to France, the gesture is a grave insult, not a physical attack, further distancing this verse from one espousing non-violence. Schweizer notes that this might be a reference to Isaiah 50:6, and that this verse might thus be referencing the cheek slap specifically as something used on blasphemers. Jesus's followers might have been subject to these affronts by those who saw them as heretics.

This verse, as with Matthew 5:37, is vague on evil. It could be interpreted as a reference to the Evil One, i.e. Satan, the general evil of the world, as translated by the KJV, or the evil of specific individuals, as is translated by the WEB. The third interpretation is the one held by most modern scholars.

This verse is partially paralleled in Luke 6:9.

== Commentary from the Church Fathers ==
Pseudo-Chrysostom: For without this command, the commands of the Law could not stand. For if according to the Law we begin all of us to render evil for evil, we shall all become evil, since they that do hurt abound. But if according to Christ we resist not evil, though they that are evil be not amended, yet they that are good remain good.

Jerome: Thus our Lord by doing away all retaliation, cuts off the beginnings of sin. So the Law corrects faults, the Gospel removes their occasions.

Glossa Ordinaria: Or it may be said that the Lord said this, adding somewhat to the righteousness of the old Law.

Augustine: The things which are done by the Saints in the New Testament profit for examples of understanding those Scriptures which are modelled into the form of precepts. Thus we read in Luke; Whoso smiteth thee on the one cheek, turn to him the other also. (Luke 6:29.) Now there is no example of patience more perfect than that of the Lord; yet He, when He was smitten, said not, ‘Behold the other cheek,’ but, If I have spoken amiss, accuse me wherein it is amiss; but if well, why smitest thou me? (John 18:23.) hereby showing us that that turning of the other cheek should be in the heart.

Augustine: For the Lord was ready not only to be smitten on the other cheek for the salvation of men, but to be crucified with His whole body. It may be asked, What does the right cheek expressly signify? As the face is that whereby any man is known, to be smitten on the face is according to the Apostle to be contemned and despised. But as we cannot say ‘right face,’ and ‘left face,’ and yet we have a name twofold, one before God, and one before the world, it is distributed as it were into the right cheek, and left cheek, that whoever of Christ’s disciples is despised for that he is a Christian, may be ready to be yet more despised for any of this world’s honours that he may have. All things wherein we suffer any wrong are divided into two kinds, of which one is what cannot be restored, the other what may be restored. In that kind which cannot be restored, we are wont to seek the solace of revenge. For what does it boot if when smitten you smite again, is the hurt done to your body thereby repaid to you? But the mind swollen with rage seeks such assuagements.

Pseudo-Chrysostom: Or has your return blow at all restrained him from striking you again? It has rather roused him to another blow. For anger is not checked by meeting anger, but is only more irritated.

Augustine: But who that is of sober mind would say to kings, It is nothing of your concern who will live religiously, or who profanely? It cannot even be said to them, that it is not their concern who will live chastely, or who unchastely. It is indeed better that men should be led to serve God by right teaching than by penalties; yet has it benefitted many, as experience has approved to us, to be first coerced by pain and fear, that they might be taught after, or to be made to conform in deed to what they had learned in words. The better men indeed are led of love, but the more part of men are wrought on by fear. Let them learn in the case of the Apostle Paul, how Christ first constrained, and after taught him.

Augustine: Therefore in this kind of injuries which are wont to rouse vengeance Christians will observe such a mean, that hate shall not be caused by the injuries they may receive, and yet wholesome correction be not foregone by Him who has right of either counsel or power.

Jerome: Mystically interpreted; When we are smitten on the right cheek, He said not, offer to him thy left, but the other; for the righteous has not a left. That is, if a heretic has smitten us in disputation, and would wound us in a right hand doctrine, let him be met with another testimony from Scripture.

Preceded by Matthew 5:38	Gospel of Matthew; Chapter 5	Succeeded by Matthew 5:40
