= Blinding (punishment) =

Type of physical punishment

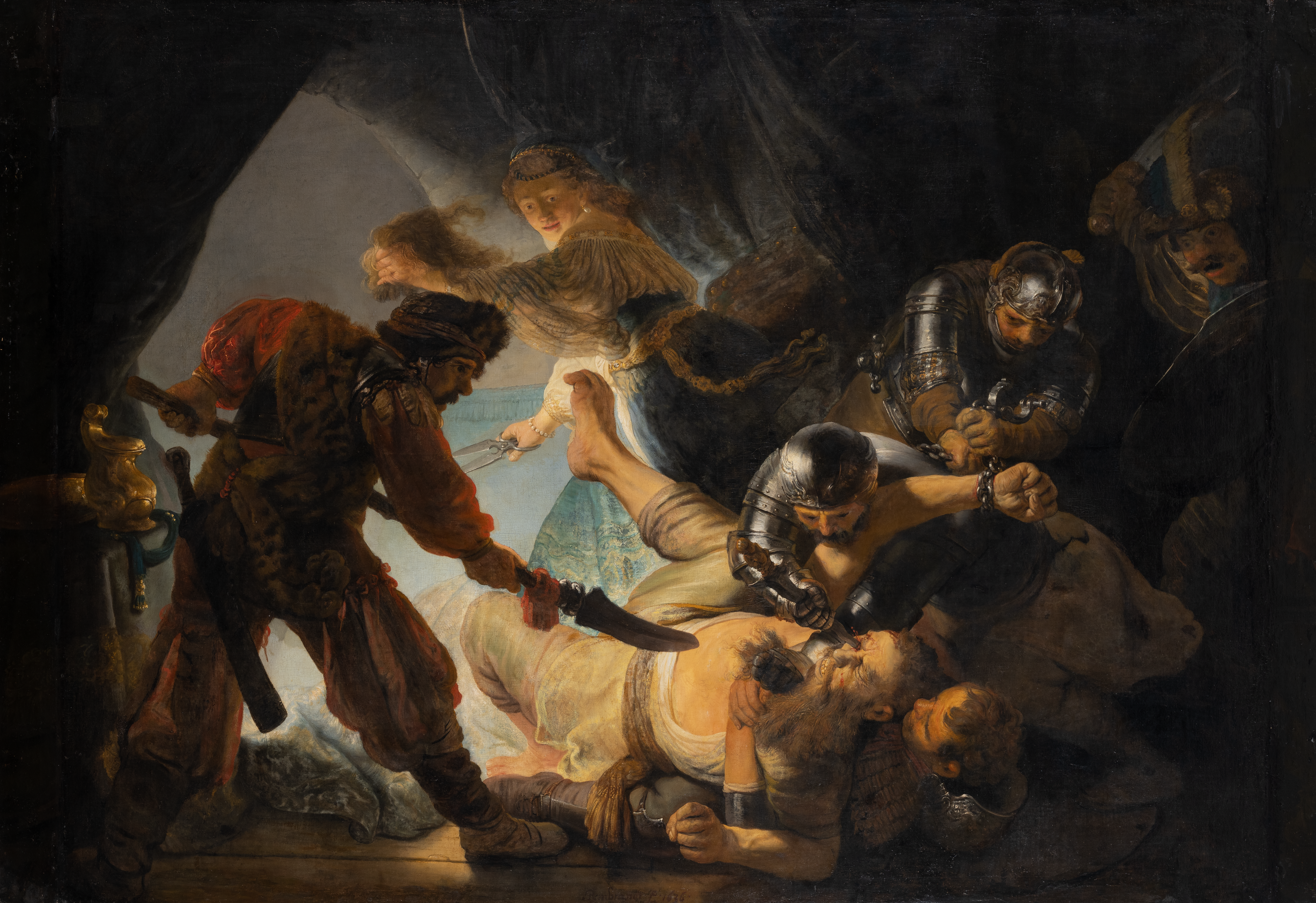
The Blinding of Samson. Rembrandt van Rijn, 1636, Städel Frankfurt

Blinding is a type of physical punishment which results in complete or nearly complete loss of vision. It was used as an act of revenge and torture. The punishment has been used since antiquity; Greek mythology makes several references to blinding as divine punishment, which reflects human practice.

In the Middle Ages, blinding was used as a penalty for treason or as a means of rendering a political opponent unable to rule and lead an army in war. In the Byzantine Empire and many other historical societies, blinding was accomplished by gouging out the eyes, sometimes using a hot poker, and by pouring a boiling substance, such as vinegar, on them.

== In mythology and religious law ==
Oedipus gouged out his own eyes after accidentally fulfilling the prophecy that he would end up killing his father and marrying his mother. In the Bible, Samson was blinded upon his capture by the Philistines.

Early Christians were often blinded as a penalty for their beliefs. For example, Saint Lucy's torturers tore out her eyes. This form of torture was also applied to the virgin martyr saints Tatiana and Hripsime, according to their stories.

== Byzantine Empire and commonwealth ==
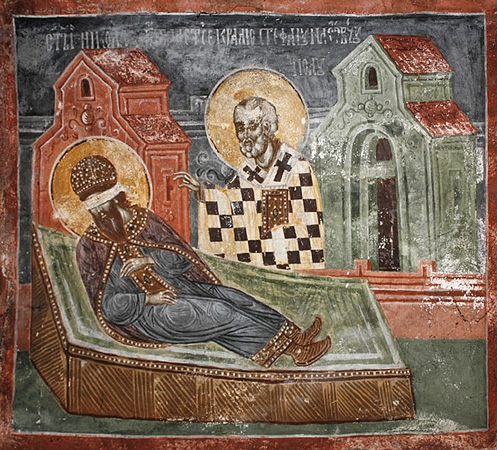
The blinded Serbian prince Stefan Dečanski reassured by St. Nicholas in a dream, Orthodox fresco from the Patriarchate of Peć. He came to rule Serbia after being blinded.

The blinding as a punishment is recorded in Byzantium since the 8th century. Prior to this, nose-cutting was a punishment recorded since 641, but which fell out of use, with the last event being the cutting of the nose of Justinian II in 695. Nose-cutting was a tradition adopted from the East, with Ancient Greece and Rome cutting the noses of rebels. The failure of deterring Justinian II from rule, which he subsequently managed, showed that nose-cutting was inefficient. Blinding of rulers and pretenders is well-known in Byzantine history since the beginning of the 8th century.

Constantine V (r. 741–775) blinded the usurper Artabasdos and his sons at the hippodrome in 742. Constantine VI (r. 780–797) was blinded by his mother in 797, and he died some years after in exile. Michael V Kalaphates (r. 1041–1042) was ousted and blinded in 1042. Romanos IV Diogenes (r. 1068–1071) was ousted and blinded following Manzikert, and died as a result of the blinding. Isaac II Angelos (r. 1185–1195; 1203–1204) was blinded in 1195 but managed to later return to the throne, which was unique. The minor and last emperor of Nikaea, John IV Laskaris (r. 1258–1261) was blinded by Michael VIII, and he retreated as a monk. Blinding was the usual means to remove political opponents in Byzantium to the last days of Byzantium.

After the Battle of Kleidion of 1014, the Byzantine emperor Basil II had captured several thousand Bulgarian soldiers, who he put in groups of 100 and blinded 99 in every group. The last soldiers had only one eye gouged out, and these one-eyed men were ordered to lead their blind friends back to their commander. This earned Emperor Basil II the nickname of "the Bulgar-Slayer". According to some accounts of the story, Tsar Samuel of Bulgaria died from a heart attack upon seeing the returning blind soldiers.

Bulgaria, which was heavily influenced by Byzantium, adopted the punishment, as seen in Boris I's blinding of his own son and heir Vladimir for anti-Christian persecution, in 893. This was made to permanently remove Vladimir from ever ruling the state. Petar Delyan, claiming to be a descendant of the Bulgarian emperor Samuel (r. 997–1014), was blinded by Bulgarian prince Alusian. Bulgarian emperor Boril (r. 1207–1218) was also ousted and blinded.

In the late 9th century, the Serbian pretender Bran Mutimirović was blinded after a coup attempt against the ruler Petar Gojniković (r. 892–917); while this shows an adoption of the Byzantine tradition, the killing of another pretender, Klonimir, speaks of there not being a regulated punishment for coup attempts by pretenders in Serbia at the time. Serbian king Stefan Milutin blinded his son and heir Stefan who revolted against his father in 1314 due to fearing for his inheritance. The blinding was however incomplete and Stefan still had vision thanks to medicine, and he came to rule Serbia. Punishments were regulated in Dušan's Code of Serbian emperor Stefan Dušan (r. 1331–1355), based on Byzantine law. The Serbian magnate Nikola Altomanović had his eye gouged on the order of Lazar Hrebeljanović, another magnate, in the tumultuous period of the Fall of the Serbian Empire. The Ottoman sultan Murad II blinded the two sons of Despot Đurađ Branković (r. 1427–1456) when he learnt of Serbian anti-Ottoman plans, and thus, his youngest son Lazar became the successor.

== Examples from elsewhere ==
Vazul (before 997–1031/1032) of the Hungarian royal House of Árpád was blinded at the order either of his cousin King Stephen I or of his queen, Gisela.

After the disinheritance and subsequent rebellion of Bernard of Italy, Louis the Pious attempted to have him blinded, but the procedure was botched, killing him instead.

In the 11th century, William the Conqueror used blinding as a punishment for rebellion to replace the death penalty in his laws for England. He was also accused of making the killing of a hart or hind in a royal forest into a crime punishable by blinding, but the Anglo-Saxon Chronicle claims that this was made up to tarnish king William's reputation.

Henry I of England blinded William, Count of Mortain, who had fought against him at Tinchebray in 1106. He also ordered blinding and castration as a punishment for thieves. Prince Álmos and his four-year-old son Béla II of Hungary were blinded in 1113 by Álmos' brother Coloman.

Mahmud Shah Durrani, the Afghan emperor of the Durrani Empire, blinded his brother and former ruler, Zaman Shah Durrani to disqualify him from succession or disputing his power ever again.

== Modern era ==
Blinding survives as a form of penalty in the modern era, especially on the Indian subcontinent. In 2003, a Pakistani court sentenced a man to be blinded after he subjected his fiancée to an acid attack resulting in her loss of vision.

The man who blinded Ameneh Bahrami in an acid attack was sentenced to blinding by an Iranian court in 2009; Bahrami eventually had his attacker pardoned.

== See also ==
- Abacination
- Blindfold
- Eye for an eye
- Mirror punishment
- Mutilation
- Scold's bridle

== Sources ==
- Živković, Vojislav (2020). "Улога ослепљења у политичком животу средњовековне Србије" [The role of blinding in the political life of Medieval Serbia] (PDF). Пешчаник - часопис Нишког архива. 19.
