= Mutilation =

Act of physical injury that degrades the appearance or function of any living body

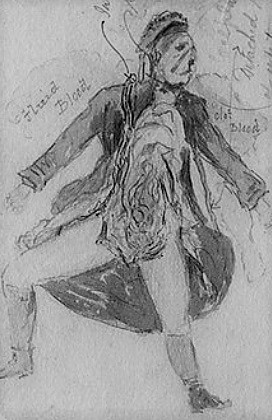
Police surgeon's drawing showing the mutilated body of Catherine Eddowes, Jack the Ripper's fourth canonical victim, as discovered on September 30, 1888

Mutilation or maiming (from the Latin: mutilus) is severe damage to the body that has a subsequent harmful effect on an individual's quality of life.

In the modern era, the term has an overwhelmingly negative connotation, referring to alterations that render something inferior, dysfunctional, imperfect, or ugly.

== Terminology ==
In 2019, Michael H. Stone, Gary Brucato, and Ann Burgess proposed formal criteria by which "mutilation" might be systematically distinguished from the act of "dismemberment", as these terms are commonly used interchangeably. They suggested that dismemberment involves "the entire removal, by any means, of a large section of the body of a living or dead person, specifically, the head (also termed decapitation), arms, hands, torso, pelvic area, legs, or feet". Mutilation, by contrast, involves "the removal or irreparable disfigurement, by any means, of some smaller portion of one of those larger sections of a living or dead person. The latter would include castration (removal of the testicles), evisceration (removal of the internal organs), and flaying (removal of the skin).

According to these parameters, removing a whole hand would constitute dismemberment, while removing or damaging a finger would be mutilation; decapitation of a full head would be dismemberment, while removing or damaging a part of the face would be mutilation; and removing a whole torso would be dismemberment, while removing or damaging a breast or the organs contained within the torso would be mutilation.

== Usage ==
Some ethnic groups practice ritual mutilation, for example, burning, clitoridectomy, or flagellation, sometimes as part of a rite of passage. In some cases, the term may even apply to treatment of dead bodies, as in the case of scalping, when a person is mutilated after they have been killed by an enemy. Castration is also a form of mutilation. The traditional Chinese practice of foot binding is a form of mutilation. Another form of mutilation that has captured the imagination of Westerners is the "long-neck" people, a sub-group of the Karen known as the Padaung where women wear brass rings around their necks to artificially make them longer.

A joint statement released by the United Nations and numerous other international bodies opposes female genital mutilation.

== Maiming ==
Maiming, or mutilation which involves the loss of, or incapacity to use, a bodily member, is and has been practiced by many societies with various cultural and religious significance, and is also a customary form of physical punishment, especially applied on the principle of an eye for an eye.

Historical examples are plenty; Chinese general Sun Bin had his kneecaps removed after being framed for treason during the Warring States period, while Araucanian warrior Galvarino had his hands amputated as punishment while as a prisoner during the Spanish conquest of Chile.

Maiming has often been a criminal offense; the old law term for a special case of maiming of persons was mayhem, an Anglo-French variant form of the word.

Maiming of animals by others than their owners is a particular form of the offense generally grouped as malicious damage. For the purpose of the law as to this offense animals are divided into cattle, which includes pigs and equids, and other animals which are either subjects of larceny at common law or are usually kept in confinement or for domestic purposes.

In Britain under the Malicious Damage Act 1861 the punishment for maiming of cattle was three to fourteen years' penal servitude; malicious injury to other animals was a misdemeanor punishable on summary conviction. For a second offense the penalty was imprisonment with hard labor for over twelve months. Today maiming of animals falls under the Cruelty to Animals Acts, while maiming by others is additionally treated as criminal damage.

== Mutilation as human punishment ==
In times when even judicial physical punishment was still commonly allowed to cause not only intense pain and public humiliation during the administration but also to inflict permanent physical damage, or even deliberately intended to mark the criminal for life by cropping or branding, one of the common anatomical target areas not normally under permanent cover of clothing (so particularly merciless in the long term) were the ear(s).

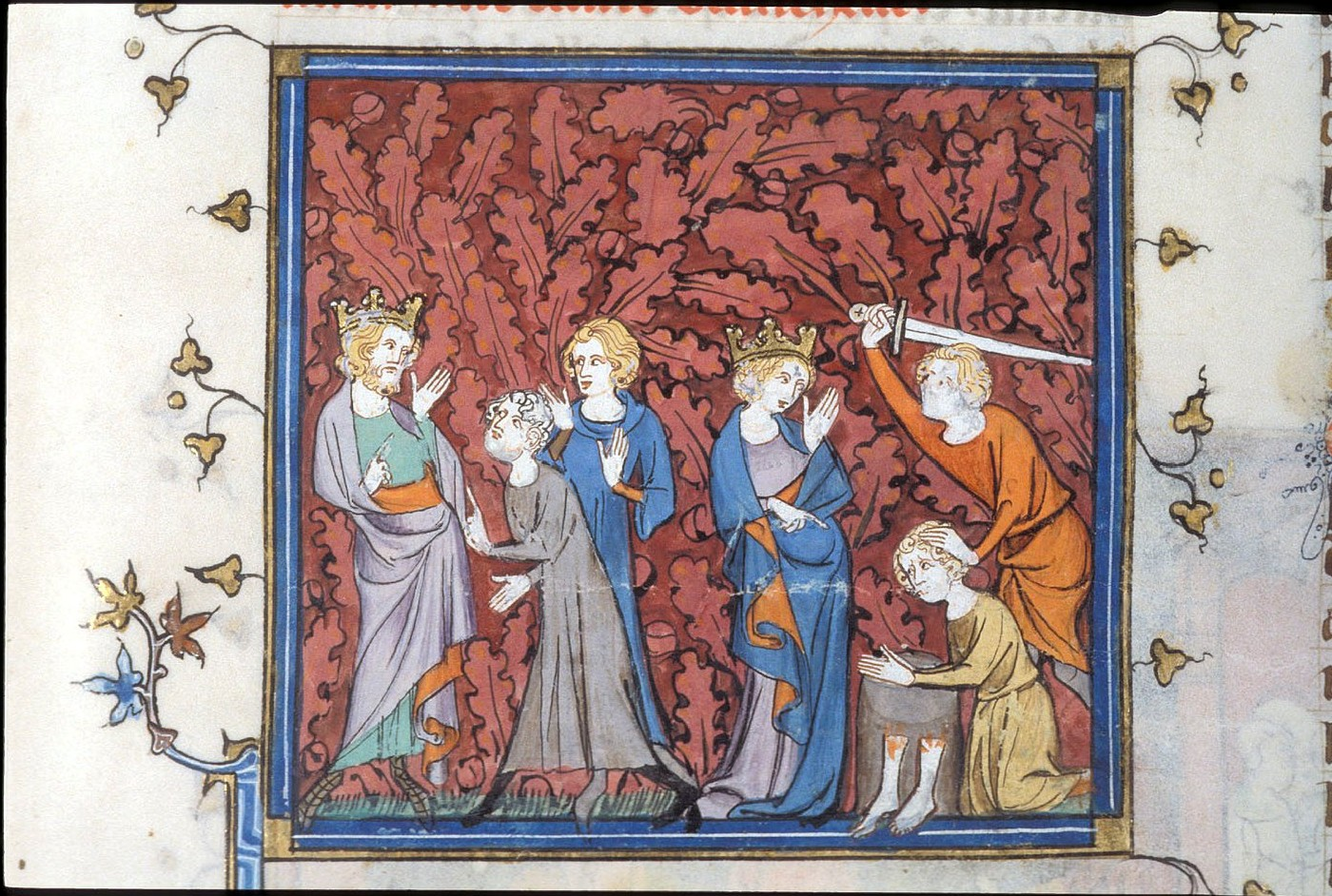
Fredegund ordering the mutilation of Olericus

In England, for example, various pamphleteers attacking the religious views of the Anglican episcopacy under William Laud, the Archbishop of Canterbury, had their ears cut off for those writings: in 1630 Alexander Leighton and in 1637 still other Puritans, John Bastwick, Henry Burton, and William Prynne.

In Scotland one of the Covenanters, James Gavin of Douglas, Lanarkshire, had his ears cut off for refusing to renounce his religious faith. In Japan, Gonsalo Garcia and his companions were similarly punished.

Notably in various jurisdictions of the Thirteen Colonies, even relatively minor crimes, such as hog stealing, were punishable by having one's ears nailed to the pillory and slit loose, or even cropped, a counterfeiter would be branded on top (for that crime, considered lèse-majesté, the older mirror punishment was boiling in oil), which was an example of western mutilation.

Independence did not render American justice any less brutal. For example, in the Southwest Territory (what would become the state of Tennessee), an example of harsh 'frontier law' under the 1780 Cumberland Compact took place in 1793 when Judge John McNairy sentenced Nashville's first horse thief, John McKain Jr., to be fastened to a wooden stock for one hour, given 39 lashes, have his ears severed, and cheeks branded with the letters "H" and "T".

Nebahne Yohannes, an unsuccessful claimant to the Ethiopian imperial throne, had his ears and nose severed before he was freed. This form of mutilation against unsuccessful claimants to thrones has been in use in the greater Middle East for thousands of years. To qualify as a king, formerly, one had to exemplify perfection. Obvious physical deformities such as missing noses, ears, or lips, are thereby sufficient disqualifications. The victim in these cases is typically freed alive to act as an example to others, and as no longer a threat.

== See also ==
- Blinding (punishment)
- Cattle mutilation
- Decapitation
- Dismemberment
- Forced circumcision
- Identification of inmates in Nazi concentration camps
- Overview of discretionary invasive procedures on animals
