= Matthew 5:41 =

- ← 5:40 5:42 →
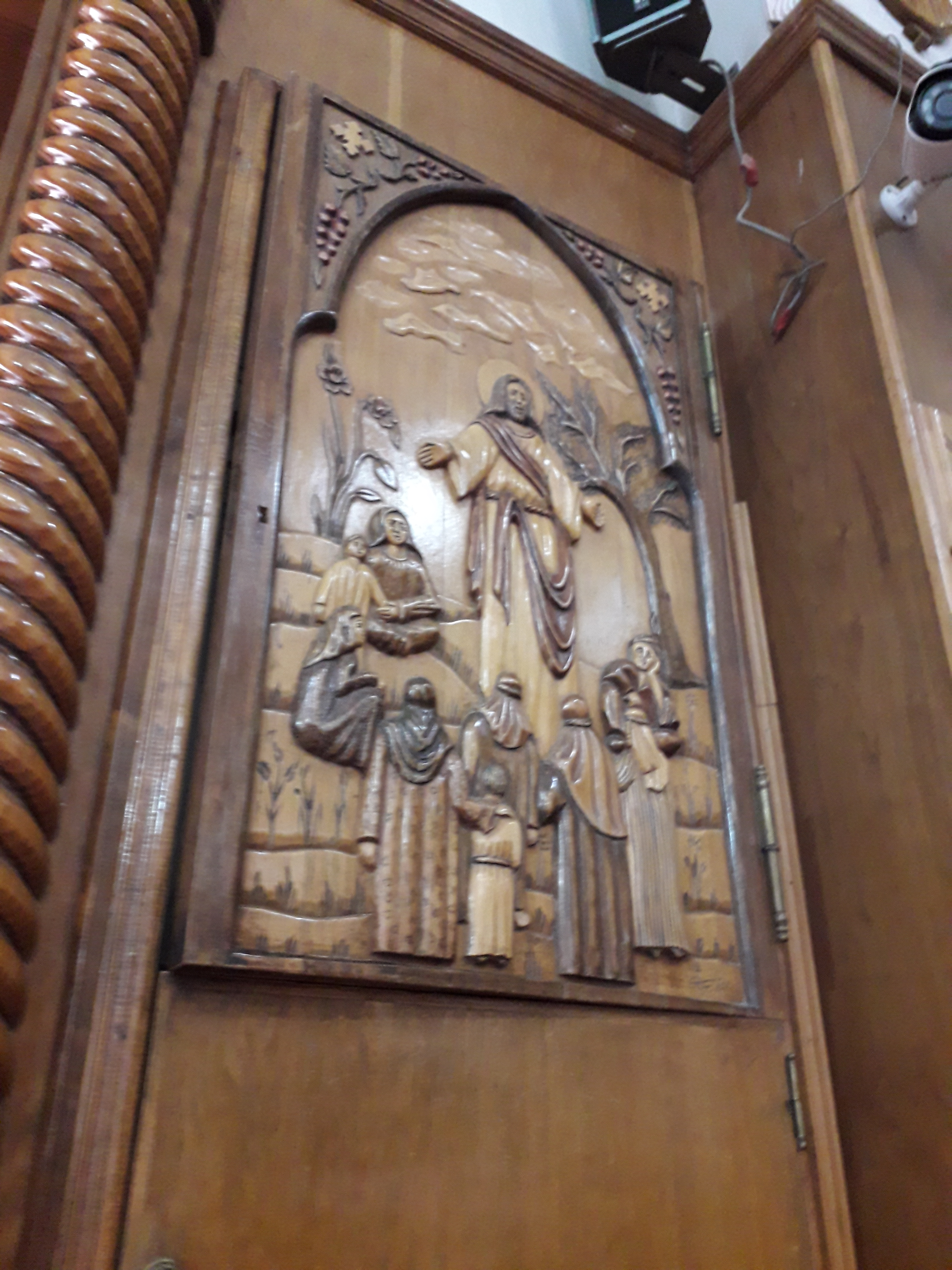
- "Sermon on the Mount". Monastery of Saint Abraam
- Book: Gospel of Matthew
- Christian Bible part: New Testament

Matthew 5:41 is the forty-first verse of the fifth chapter of the Gospel of Matthew in the New Testament and is part of the Sermon on the Mount. This is the fourth verse of the antithesis on the commandment: "Eye for an eye".

== Content ==
In the King James Version of the Bible the text reads:

And whosoever shall compel thee to go a mile, go with him twain.

The World English Bible translates the passage as:

Whoever compels you to go one mile, go with him two.

The Novum Testamentum Graece text is:

καὶ ὅστις σε ἀγγαρεύσει μίλιον ἕν, ὕπαγε μετ’ αὐτοῦ δύο. (Note: For additional translations see Matthew 5:41)

== Analysis ==
The word here translated as compel, ἀγγαρεύσει (angareusei), is a Persian loan word used as a technical term for the Roman practice of requisitioning local goods or labour. Eduard Schweizer notes that it refers specifically to the power of the Roman authorities to demand that a local person serve as a guide or porter.

Later, at Matthew 27:32, Simon of Cyrene will be forced by such rules to carry Jesus' cross: this is the only other time in the New Testament the word translated as compel is used. The Zealots loathed this practice, and their refusal to participate in such tasks was an important part of their philosophy and a cause of the First Jewish–Roman War. According to R. T. France, these commands would have shocked the Jewish audience as Jesus' response to the Roman occupation was starkly different from the other Jewish activists of the period. Jesus says nothing about the propriety of such demands, Schweizer notes that Jesus simply accepts it as fact. Thomas Aquinas wrote that this verse implies that it is reasonable to follow laws that are unjust, but argued that laws that are unconscionable must not be obeyed.

The word here translated as mile refers to the Roman definition of 1000 paces, slightly shorter than a modern mile. The mile was a specifically Roman unit of measure, locally the stadion was used to measure length. Miles would have been used only by the imperial government and the local occupying forces, which further links this verse with imperial repression. This verse is the origin of the English phrase "going the extra mile", which means to do more than is expected. See The Extra Mile (disambiguation) for its usage in popular culture.

== Notes ==
| Preceded by Matthew 5:40 | Gospel of Matthew; Chapter 5 | Succeeded by Matthew 5:42 |
