= Matthew 5:40 =

- ← 5:39 5:41 →
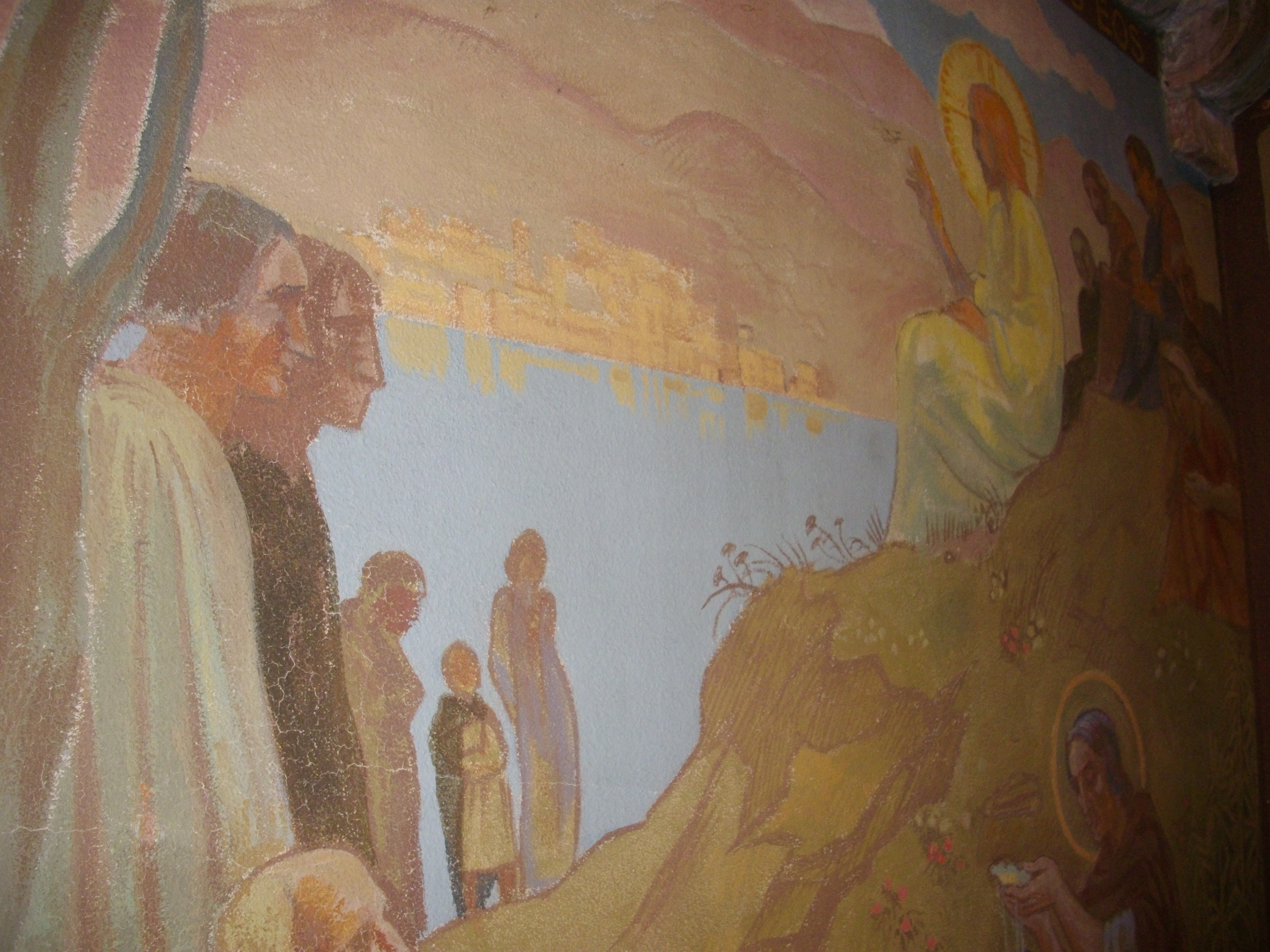
- "Sermon on the Mount". Interior of Saint Nicasius church of Reims (Marne, France) : baptistery, decorated by Maurice Denis in 1934.
- Book: Gospel of Matthew
- Christian Bible part: New Testament

Matthew 5:40 is the fortieth verse of the fifth chapter of the Gospel of Matthew in the New Testament and is part of the Sermon on the Mount. This is the third verse of the antithesis on the commandment: "Eye for an eye".

== Content ==
In the King James Version of the Bible the text reads:

And if any man will sue thee at the law, and
take away thy coat, let him have thy cloak also.

The World English Bible translates the passage as:

If anyone sues you to take away your
coat, let him have your cloak also.

The Novum Testamentum Graece text is:

καὶ τῷ θέλοντί σοι κριθῆναι καὶ τὸν χιτῶνά σου λαβεῖν,
ἄφες αὐτῷ καὶ τὸ ἱμάτιον

== Analysis ==
The word coat here can also be translated as shirt, and it refers to the basic garment one would wear on one's upper body.

This is often interpreted as an example of the non-resistance Jesus advocated in the previous verse. France, however, disagrees with this view. He sees this verse as far more closely linked to Jesus' renunciation of property and the material. If one has faith in God, one should not be afraid to lose all material possessions, for even if it leads to great hardship on Earth, they will be properly rewarded by God.

Nolland interprets this verse as referring to a specific case of someone extremely poor, who has nothing but his clothing to be sued for. The demand of the creditor is thus unreasonable and is a possible violation of Jewish law. To Nolland the surrendering of the cloak and the last vestiges of decency will serve to shame the creditor and show his immorality.

Difficulty is added to the interpretation of this verse due to the mistranslation and one's understanding of the previous verse (YLT): "But I say unto you, That ye resist not the evil: but whosoever shall smite thee on thy right cheek, turn to him the other also." The adjective ponero is often translated as “not evil” (KJV) or other variants such as "the evil person." Examining the Greek to English Interlinear, the brackets show ‘person’ was being inferred by the translators while the adjective ponero simply means evil. Additionally, Exodus 21:24-27 shows that an "eye for an eye" was not to be taken literally as a servant who lost an eye or tooth due to their master striking them was to be let go as a freeman. One related instruction the nation of Israel was giving on the topic of judicial prosecution is seen in Leviticus 19:18 which states: "Thou shalt not avenge, nor bear any grudge against the children of thy people, but thou shalt love thy neighbour as thyself."

In verse 39, neither was Jesus referring to what the judges should do regarding an eye for an eye but rather how his disciples should respond when they are the offended. And because an eye for an eye was being addressed the focus here revolved around retaliation through legal means. As to why an oral teaching regarding this was being addressed, a collection of books written around 200 A.D that essentially recorded debates between Rabbinic sages regarding Jewish oral traditions, gives us a closer view to the time period and clues. In m. B. K. 8:6, we read that a slap on the cheek had been declared as a low form of insult that resulted in a payment of 200 zuz but 400 if it was done with the backhand. Other low forms of insults, such as shouting at a fellow was punishable for 20 zuz, while spitting on one was punishable for 400. Knowing this, the content of the offenses Jesus addresses in this passage are minor, thus turning the other cheek means to take the high road on petty matters. Relatedly, within Judaism, for the clause “if a man cause a blemish in his neighbour; as he hath done, so shall it be done to him,” (Leviticus 24:19-20) the majority stance is that “as” is to be taken as conveying that the punishment should fit the crime, just as “eye for an eye” is not to be taken as a literal expression.

All the uses of an eye for an eye are related to mostly severe bodily or monetary crimes (Deuteronomy 19:16-21; Exodus 21:22-24): here in Matthew 5:40, Jesus likely follows his line of thinking on the evil being addressed, instructing his disciples not to resist a quarrel where they're being sued for something small in value (a cloak), rather just give it to them and return their evil with good. The spirit of this teaching is also seen in Proverbs 25:21 and Romans 12:19-21 where an enemy is to be given food to eat. Exodus 22:25-27 is an unrelated law, regarding giving back a garment that was a pledge for a loan to the poor (with no relation to legally prosecuting someone). And not heeding to Israel's judges could even bring the death penalty (Deuteronomy 17:9-12). In conclusion, the rabbinic sages seem to have been using it wrongly for petty matters.

== Commentary from the Church Fathers ==
Augustine: The other kind of injuries are those in which full restitution can be made, of which there are two kinds; one relates to money, the other to work; of the first of these it is He speaks when He continues, Whoso will sue thee for thy coat, let him have thy cloak likewise. As by the cheek are denoted such injuries of the wicked as admit of no restitution but revenge, so by this similitude of the garments is denoted such injury as admits restitution. And this, as the former, is rightly taken of preparation of the heart, not of the show of the outward action. And what is commanded respecting our garments, is to be observed in all things that by any right we call our own in worldly property. For if the command be expressed in these necessary articles of life, how much more does it hold in the case of superfluities and luxuries? And when He says, He who will sue thee, He clearly intends to include every thing for which it is possible that we should be sued. It may be made a question whether it is to be understood of slaves, for a Christian ought not to possess his slave on the same footing as his horse; though it might be that the horse was worth the more money. And if your slave have a milder master in you than he would have in him who seeks to take him from you, I do not know that he ought to be given up as lightly as your coat.

Pseudo-Chrysostom: For it were an unworthy thing that a believer should stand in his cause before an unbelieving judge. Or if one who is a believer, though (as he must be) a worldly man, though he should have reverenced you for the worthiness of the faith, sues you because the cause is a necessary one, you will lose the worthiness of Christ for the business of the world. Further, every lawsuit irritates the heart and excites bad thoughts; for when you see dishonesty or bribery employed against you, you hasten to support your own cause by like means, though originally you might have intended nothing of the sort.

Augustine: The Lord here forbids his disciples to have lawsuits with others for worldly property. Yet as the Apostle allows such kind of causes to be decided between brethren, and before arbiters who are brethren, but utterly disallows them without the Church, it is manifest what is conceded to infirmity as pardonable.

Gregory the Great: There are, who are so far to be endured, as they rob us of our worldly goods; but there are whom we ought to hinder, and that without breaking the law of charity, not only that we may not be robbed of what is ours, but lest they by robbing others destroy themselves. We ought to fear much more for the men who rob us, than to be eager to save the inanimate things they take from us. When peace with our neighbour is banished the heart on the matter of worldly possessions, it is plain that our estate is more loved than our neighbour.

Augustine: The third kind of wrongs, which is in the matter of labour, consists of both such as admit restitution, and such as do not—or with or without revenge—for he who forcibly presses a man's service, and makes him give him aid against his will, can either be punished for his crime, or return the labour. In this kind of wrongs then, the Lord teaches that the Christian mind is most patient, and prepared to endure yet more than is offered; If a man constrain thee to go with him a mile, go with him yet other two. This likewise is meant not so much of actual service with your feet, as of readiness of mind.

Chrysostom: The word here used signifies to drag unjustly, without cause, and with insult.

Pseudo-Chrysostom: Because wealth is not ours but God's; God would have us stewards of His wealth, and not lords.

Preceded by Matthew 5:39	Gospel of Matthew; Chapter 5	Succeeded by Matthew 5:41
