= Law of retribution =

Law of retribution may refer to:

- Eye for an eye, in Abrahamic traditions
- Karma, in Indian religions
