= Nonconformity to the world =

Christian doctrine

Nonconformity to the world, also called separation from the world, is a Christian doctrine based on Romans 12:2, 2 Corinthians 6:17 and other verses of the New Testament that became important among different Protestant groups, especially among Wesleyans and Anabaptists. The corresponding German word used by Anabaptists is Absonderung. Nonconformity is primarily expressed through the practices of plain dress and simple living.

== Biblical basis ==
Among the verses of the New Testament used to support the concept of nonconformity to the world are:

- "Do not be conformed to this world but be transformed by the renewing of your minds, so that you may discern what is the will of God—what is good and acceptable and perfect." (Romans 12:2)
- "Wherefore come out from among them, and be ye separate." (2 Corinthians 6:17)
- "If any man love the world, the love of the Father is not in him." (1 John 2:15)
- "Know ye not that the friendship of the world is enmity against God? Whosoever therefore would be a friend of the world is the enemy of God." (James 4:3)
- "That which is highly esteemed among men is abomination in the sight of God." (Luke 16:15)
- "Ye are a chosen generation, a royal priesthood, a holy nation, a peculiar people." (1 Peter 2:9)
- "Pure religion and undefiled before God and the Father is this, To visit the fatherless and widows in their affliction, and to keep himself unspotted from the world." (James 1:27)

== History ==
Even though not unique to Wesleyan and Anabaptist Christians (such as Mennonites), the concept of nonconformity has found an unusually intense and detailed application among these groups. Other groups that practice forms of separation from the world are the Exclusive Brethren and the Church of God (Restoration). 20th-century minister and religious radio broadcaster Carl McIntire stressed the doctrine of nonconformity to the world.

== Practice by Christian denomination ==
=== Anabaptism ===
Among traditional Anabaptist groups nonconformity is practiced in relation to dress, the use of technology like horse and buggy transportation instead of cars, the rejection of television and radio, the use of language (i.e. German dialects like Pennsylvania German or Plautdietsch instead of English, Spanish, or French), nonresistance, avoidance of oaths, and avoidance of lawsuits.

Anabaptist groups that practice nonconformity to the world today belong either to the Old Order Movement, the "Russian" Mennonites, the Hutterites, or the Bruderhof. These groups live either in Canada, the United States, or Latin America ("Russian" Mennonites).

=== Methodism ===
Methodist theology traditionally emphasizes the scriptural injunction "be ye separate", which lessens temptation. The doctrine of separation from the world continues to be emphasized by Methodist connexions in the conservative holiness movement, such as the Evangelical Methodist Church Conference, which in its 2017 Book of Discipline, teaches:

We believe the scriptures teach a clear separation between the church and the world. Such must ever exist if the church is to make her witness felt in a world committed to evil and darkness. Chaste and holy conversation as well as honesty in business transactions are rules of this separation. In matters of entertainment and recreation, our people are to avoid such pursuits as contributes to worldliness. We admonish our people to live in carefulness as instructed in Philippians 4:8, "Finally brethren, whatsoever things are true, whatsoever things are honest, whatsoever things are just, whatsoever things are pure, whatsoever things are lovely, whatsoever things are of good report; if there be any virtue, and if there be any praise, think on these things." Also bearing in mind Romans 8:1, "There is therefore now no condemnation to them which are in Christ Jesus, who walk not after the flesh but after the Spirit." Since sports have assumed a position in modern life out of all proportion to their value, our people are instructed to refrain from attendance at or participation in organized professional sports. We hold, further, that due to the influence/effect of media entertainment and social media upon spiritual life, our people should strive to harmonize with Philippians 4:8, when utilizing media devices or social media. Ungodly media entertainment and social media will be defined as those things that promote unbiblical values and philosophies. Philippians 4:8-"...whatsoever things are true, whatsoever things are honest, whatsoever things are just, whatsoever things are pure, whatsoever things are lovely, whatsoever things are of good report; if there be any virtue, and if there be any praise, think on these things." James 4:4; I Thess. 5:22; II Cor. 6:17 —Evangelical Methodist Church Discipline (¶26-¶27)

== Sources ==
- John C. Wenger: Separated unto God: a Plea for Christian Simplicity of Life and for a Scriptural Nonconformity to the World. Scottdale, PA 1951.
