= Matthew 5:32 =

- ← 5:31 5:33 →
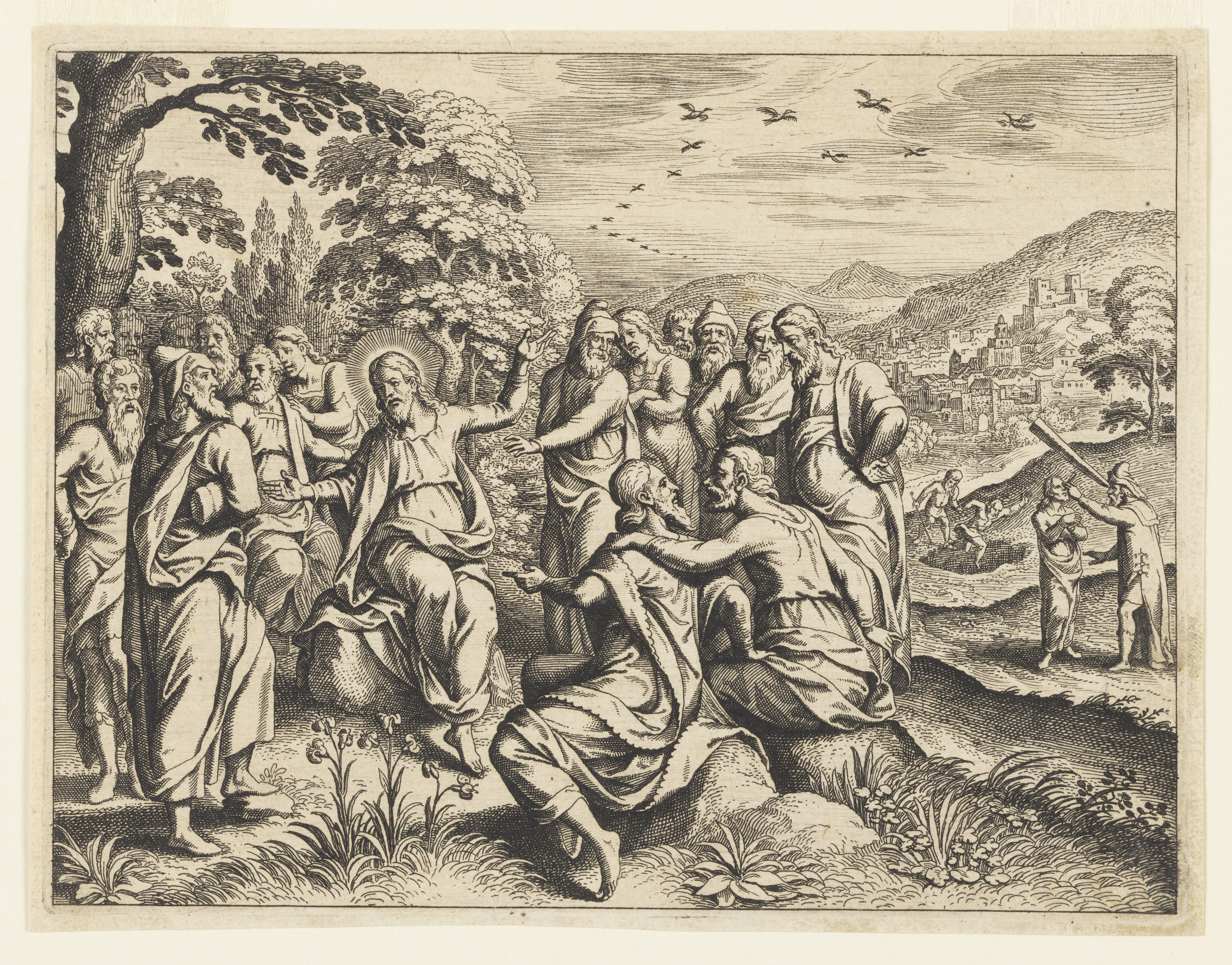
- "Sermon on the Mount". Print, 17th century
- Book: Gospel of Matthew
- Christian Bible part: New Testament

Matthew 5:32 is the thirty-second verse of the fifth chapter of the Gospel of Matthew in the New Testament and part of the Sermon on the Mount. This much scrutinized verse contains part of Jesus' teachings on the issue of divorce.

== Text ==
The original Koine Greek, according to Westcott and Hort, reads:

ἐγὼ δὲ λέγω ὑμῖν ὅτι πᾶς ὁ ἀπολύων τὴν γυναῖκα αὐτοῦ
παρεκτὸς λόγου πορνείας ποιεῖ αὐτὴν μοιχευθῆναι
[καὶ ὃς ἐὰν ἀπολελυμένην γαμήσῃ μοιχᾶται]

In the King James Version of the Bible the text reads:

But I say unto you, That whosoever shall put away his wife, saving
for the cause of fornication, causeth her to commit adultery: and
whosoever shall marry her that is divorced committeth adultery.

The New International Version translates the passage as:

But I tell you that anyone who divorces his wife, except for sexual
immorality, makes her the victim of adultery, and anyone who marries
a divorced woman commits adultery.

The New American Bible translates this passage as:

But I say to you, whoever divorces his wife (unless the
marriage is unlawful) causes her to commit adultery,
and whoever marries a divorced woman commits adultery.

The New Living Translation translates this passage as:

But I say that a man who divorces his wife, unless she has been
unfaithful, causes her to commit adultery. And anyone who marries
a divorced woman also commits adultery.

For a collection of other versions see BibleHub Matthew 5:32

Divorce is discussed in several other parts of the Bible. Malachi 2:16 has God disapproving of divorce, but Deuteronomy 24:1–4 makes clear that it is acceptable under certain circumstances (see Christian views on divorce). A very similar pronouncement on divorce is made by Jesus at Luke 16:18 and Mark 10:11, however neither of those two make an exception for πορνεία/porneia. Paul of Tarsus quotes Jesus ("not I but the Lord") in 1 Corinthians 7:10–11 with no exceptions granted although he ("I and not the Lord") goes on to give exceptions. Matthew 19:9 discusses the same issue, and does include the same exception as this verse.

== Interpretations ==
The most debated issue is over the exception to the ban on divorce, which the KJV translates as "saving for the cause of fornication." The Koine Greek word in the exception is πορνείας/porneia, this has variously been translated to specifically mean adultery, to mean any form of marital immorality, or to a narrow definition of marriages already invalid by law.

=== Adultery ===
One of the most common translations is that the permissible rule for divorce should be translated as adultery or marital unfaithfulness. Protestant churches have traditionally read πορνείας/porneia as adultery.

At the time of first century Iudaea Province, Pharisaic Judaism was divided between two major groups. The dominant teaching was that of Hillel, who taught that divorce could be granted on a wide array of grounds, even because a wife burnt a dinner. Shammai took a more conservative opinion, arguing that only adultery was valid grounds for divorce. The most accept theory of the Synoptic Gospels of Matthew, Mark, and Luke are that they are based upon a single writer whose original verse is that of Mark, with Matthew being the most intended to communicate with the Jewish community. Some scholars feel that in Matthew 5:32 Jesus is endorsing the view of Shammai over Hillel, and arguing for the adultery only rule.

Some scholars feel that under the liberal divorce policy of Hillel men had been marrying women and then casually divorcing them after they lost interest, deeply injuring the women. In this era a woman had few legal rights, a divorce could endanger a woman's very survival. Thus some have read Jesus' teachings here as a defence of the rights of the downtrodden wives. Feminist scholar Levine rejects this view. She notes that in this era elaborate prenuptial agreements were negotiated prior to every marriage, and that they invariably included steep financial penalties, known as ketubah, paid by the husband in case of divorce, guaranteeing the wife financial well-being even in case of divorce.

Other scholars take the opposite view to the argument that Matthew was adding more detail than the other gospels for his more Jewish audience, arguing that the exception was not mentioned in the other Gospels because it was so obvious as to be implicit to contemporary readers. Leviticus 20:10 makes clear the punishment for adultery is death, so to Jesus's Jewish audience it would be assumed that adultery meant that the marriage would be over. While at the time of Jesus, and in modern societies, capital punishment is not imposed for adultery several scholars still feel the death sentence is important. Martin Luther argued that since in the eyes of God an adulterer was dead, their spouse was free to remarry. More evidence for this view comes from Genesis 2:24, which makes clear that the sexual act permanently joins two individuals, so adultery can be understood to have created a new bond erasing the old one.

Another view is that the exception is not a part of Jesus's teaching, but rather a comment indicating that adultery automatically led to divorce under the law of the time, and that Jesus may very well have disagreed with this law. Instone-Brewer sees no evidence that this is how the law worked in that era, however.

Following their reading of the verse, Protestant churches give prominence to the Gospel of Matthew over Mark and Luke and accepted adultery as a valid grounds for divorce. They also often believe that an innocent divorcee can freely remarry afterwards. That adultery is a valid reason for divorce is the standard Protestant position. This interpretation was first advanced by Desiderius Erasmus, and received the backing of Martin Luther, John Calvin, and most other major Protestant thinkers.

For many centuries there was debate over this issue in the Roman Catholic Church. Major thinkers such as St. Augustine supporting adultery as the valid reason given in this verse for divorce. However, at the Council of Trent in 1563 the indissolubility of marriage was added to the canon law. Since that day Catholic doctrine has been that divorce is unacceptable, but the separation of spouses can be permitted.

The main argument against this translation is that Matthew has just been discussing adultery in the previous antithesis, and there used the specific term μοιχεύσεις/moicheia, rejecting the vaguer πορνείας/porneia.

=== Marital immorality ===
Some translators believe that this verse means divorce is allowed on greater grounds than just adultery. Swiss reformers Huldrych Zwingli and Heinrich Bullinger both read porneia as referring to all manner of marital immorality, including spousal abuse and abandonment. British Archbishop Thomas Cranmer, who served under King Henry VIII, listed a considerable number of valid reasons for divorce, but this never became standard Anglican doctrine. The Church of England instead took a far more restrictive view, and adultery was one of the only legal reasons for divorce in Britain up to the twentieth century. The same was true in many parts of the British Empire and the United States.

Many mainline Protestants churches have accepted a broader translation of porneia than just adultery, and now support a wide array of valid reasons for divorce. One modern view is that, since throughout the Sermon on the Mount Jesus condemns the excessive legalism of his day, delineating specific views of divorce from the exact wording of a piece of scripture should be rejected. Several major churches today believe that rules for divorce should be set to best advance Jesus's overarching goals of love and justice, rather than a legalistic interpretation of his words.

The Eastern Orthodox Church has also recognized this verse as permitting divorce for adultery and other reasons, such as spousal abuse, abandonment, and apostasy. In Eastern Orthodox practice, churches are to allow penitential remarriage up to two times after a divorce. A first marriage is celebrated, a second performed, a third tolerated, and a fourth prohibited.

=== Invalid marriage ===
The official Catholic position remains that there are no valid reasons for divorce, and a number of methods for reconciling this with Matthew's exception have been proposed. One is that the other synoptics do not mention the exception could be because it only refers to very obscure circumstances. Some read it as referring specifically to marriages that, while permissible under pagan religions, such as those between blood relations, were illegal under Jewish and Christian law.

According to Bruce Metzger's Textual Commentary on the Greek New Testament, commentary on the Apostolic Decree of the Council of Jerusalem: "it is possible ... (fornication means) marriage within the prohibited Levitical degrees (Leviticus 18:6–18), which the rabbis described as "forbidden for porneia," or mixed marriages with pagans (Numbers 25:1; also compare 2 Corinthians 6:14), or participation in pagan worship which had long been described by Old Testament prophets as spiritual adultery and which, in fact, offered opportunity in many temples for religious prostitution".

Another reading is that the exception refers to the rules surrounding the Jewish betrothal ritual, linking this to Matthew 1:19, and has no relevance to the modern world.

=== Fornication ===
Some interpreters take the meaning of πορνείας to include ante-nuptial sin: "(32) Saving for the cause of fornication.—The most generic term seems intentionally used to include ante-nuptial as well as post-nuptial sin, possibly, indeed, with reference to the former only, seeing that the strict letter of the Law of Moses made death the punishment of the latter, and so excluded the possibility of the adultery of a second marriage."

== Commentary from the Church Fathers ==
Hilary of Poitiers: But the Lord who brought peace and goodwill on earth, would have it reign especially in the matrimonial bond.

Augustine: By interposing this delay in the mode of putting away, the lawgiver showed as clearly as it could be shown to hard hearts, that he hated strife and disagreement. The Lord then so confirms this backwardness in the Law, as to except only one case, the cause of fornication; every other inconvenience which may have place, He bids us bear with patience in consideration of the plighted troth of wedlock.

Pseudo-Chrysostom: If we ought to bear the burdens of strangers, in obedience to that of the Apostle, Bear ye one another's burdens, (Gal. 6:2.) how much more that of our wives and husbands? The Christian husband ought not only to keep himself from any defilement, but to be careful not to give others occasion of defilement; for so is their sin imputed to him who gave the occasion. Whoso then by putting away his wife gives another man occasion of committing adultery, is condemned for that crime himself.

Augustine: Yea more, He declares the man who marries her who is put away an adulterer.

Chrysostom: Say not here, It is enough her husband has put her away; for even after she is put away she continues the wife of him that put her away.

Augustine: The Apostle has fixed the limit here, requiring her to abstain from a fresh marriage as long as her husband lives. After his death he allows her to marry. But if the woman may not marry while her former husband is alive, much less may she yield herself to unlawful indulgences. But this command of the Lord, forbidding to put away a wife, is not broken by him who lives with her not carnally but spiritually, in that more blessed wedlock of those that keep themselves chaste. A question also here arises as to what is that fornication which the Lord allows as a cause of divorce; whether carnal sin, or, according to the Scripture use of the word, any unlawful passion, as idolatry, avarice, in short all transgression of the Law by forbidden desires. For if the Apostle permits the divorce of a wife if she be unbelieving, (though indeed it is better not to put her away,) and the Lord forbids any divorce but for the cause of fornication, unbelief even must be fornication. And if unbelief be fornication, and idolatry unbelief, and covetousness idolatry, it is not to be doubted that covetousness is fornication. And if covetousness be fornication, who may say of any kind of unlawful desire that it is not a kind of fornication?

Augustine: Yet I would not have the reader think this disputation of ours sufficient in a matter so arduous; for not every sin is spiritual fornication, nor does God destroy every sinner, for He hears His saints daily crying to Him, Forgive us our debts; but every man who goes a whoring and forsakes Him, him He destroys. Whether this be the fornication for which divorce is allowed is a most knotty question—for it is no question at all that it is allowed for the fornication by carnal sin.

Augustine: If any affirm that the only fornication for which the Lord allows divorce is that of carnal sin, he may say that the Lord has spoken of believing husbands and wives, forbidding either to leave the other except for fornication.

Augustine: Not only does He permit to put away a wife who commits fornication, but whoso puts away a wife by whom he is driven to commit fornication, puts her away for the cause of fornication, both for his own sake and hers.

Augustine: He also rightly puts away his wife to whom she shall say, I will not be your wife unless you get me money by robbery; or should require any other crime to be done by him. If the husband here be truly penitent, he will cut off the limb that offends him.

Augustine: Nothing can be more unjust than to put away a wife for fornication, and yourself to be guilty of that sin, for then is that happened, Wherein thou judgest another, thou condemnest thyself. (Rom. 2:1.) When He says, And he who marrieth her who is put away, committeth adultery, a question arises, does the woman also in this case commit adultery? For the Apostle directs either that she remain unmarried, or be reconciled to her husband. There is this difference in the separation, namely, which of them was the cause of it. If the wife put away the husband and marry another, she appears to have left her first husband with the desire of change, which is an adulterous thought. But if she have been put away by her husband, yet he who marries her commits adultery, how can she be quit of the same guilt? And further, if he who marries her commits adultery, she is the cause of his committing adultery, which is what the Lord is here forbidding.

| Preceded by Matthew 5:31 | Gospel of Matthew; Chapter 5 | Succeeded by Matthew 5:33 |
