= Matthew 5:35–36 =

- ← 5:34 5:37 →
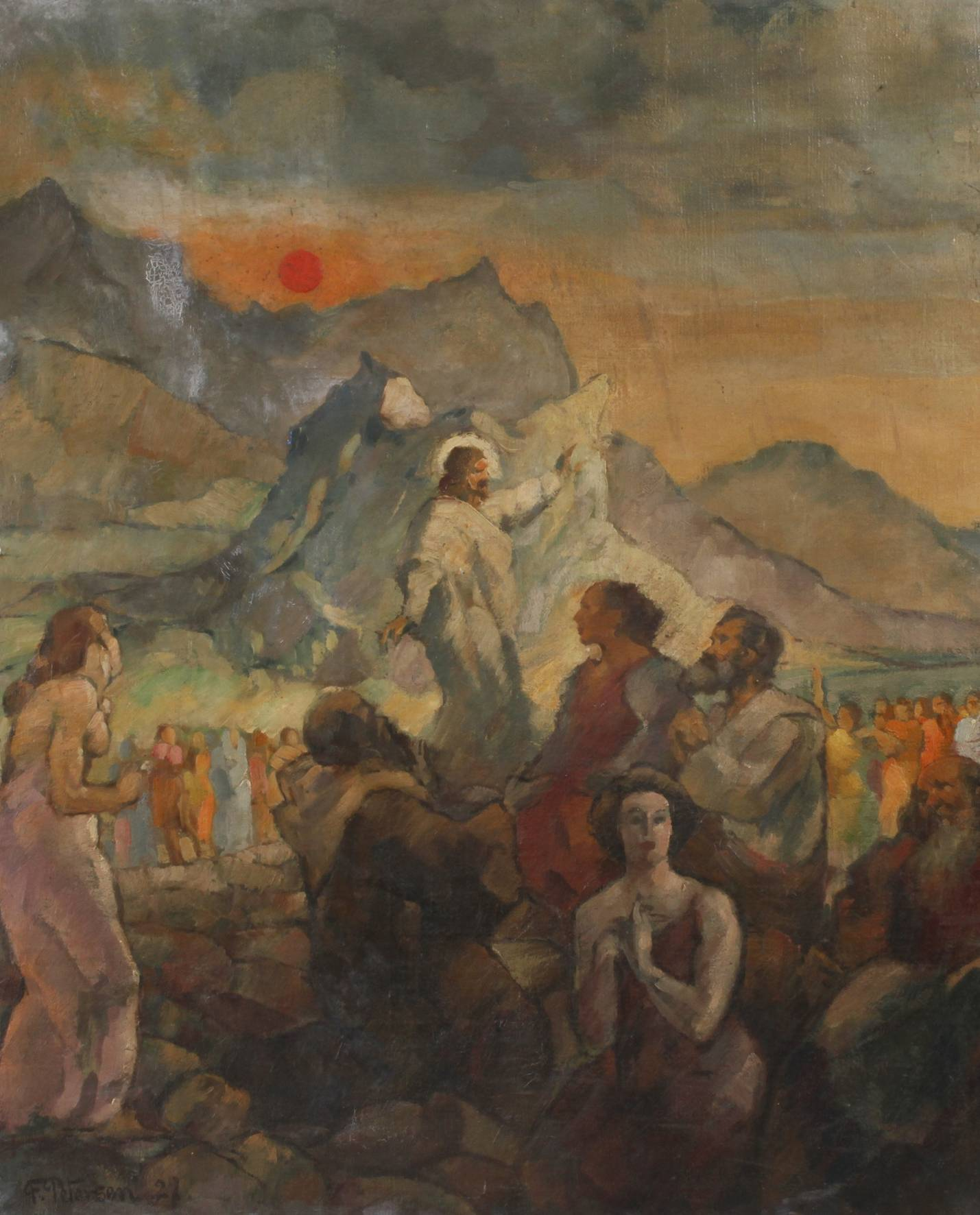
- "Sermon on the Mount" (Bergpredigt), by Friedrich Petersen (1927).
- Book: Gospel of Matthew
- Christian Bible part: New Testament

Matthew 5:35 and Matthew 5:36 are the thirty-fifth and thirty-sixth verses of the fifth chapter of the Gospel of Matthew in the New Testament. They are part of the Sermon on the Mount. These verses are part of either the third or fourth antithesis, the discussion of oaths. Jesus tells his listeners in Matthew 5:34 "to not swear oaths" and in here presents examples of swearing oaths. In context, this passage refers not to the modern understanding of cursing or using foul language, but rather, the act of swearing oaths and making promises.

== Content ==
In the King James Version of the Bible the text reads:

35 Nor by the earth; for it is his footstool: neither
by Jerusalem; for it is the city of the great King.
36 Neither shalt thou swear by thy head,
because thou canst not make one hair white or black.

The World English Bible translates the passage as:

35 nor by the earth, for it is the footstool of his feet;
nor by Jerusalem, for it is the city of the great King.
36 Neither shall you swear by your head,
for you can't make one hair white or black

The Novum Testamentum Graece text is:

35 μήτε ἐν τῇ γῇ, ὅτι ὑποπόδιόν ἐστιν τῶν ποδῶν αὐτοῦ
μήτε εἰς Ἱεροσόλυμα, ὅτι πόλις ἐστὶν τοῦ μεγάλου Βασιλέως
36 μήτε ἐν τῇ κεφαλῇ σου ὀμόσῃς,
ὅτι οὐ δύνασαι μίαν τρίχα λευκὴν ποιῆσαι ἢ μέλαιναν.

For a collection of other versions see BibleHub Matthew 5:35-36

== Analysis ==
Jesus quotes Isaiah 66:1 in the previous verse to tell his followers not to swear by Heaven. In this verse he quotes the second half of Isaiah 66:1 to tell his followers not to swear by the earth. Gundry notes that through the Gospel the author of Matthew tends to pair heaven and earth. The reference to Jerusalem is to Psalm 48:2. Hill notes that "by Jerusalem" can be translated as "toward Jerusalem" and could be linked to the practice of turning toward Jerusalem when swearing an oath. The term "great king" is a clear reference to God, and was one of many terms commonly used at the time to refer to him. Schweizer feels that as with the previous verse Jesus is countering the belief that swearing by things other than God is not equivalent to swearing by God. Thus he argues that swearing by the earth is the same as swearing by God as the earth is "god's footstool", while swearing by Jerusalem is the same as swearing by God as it is his city.

Matthew 5:33-5:36 is reiterated in James 5:12:

But above all things, my brethren, swear not,
neither by heaven,
neither by the earth,
neither by any other oath: but let your yea be yea; and your nay, nay;
lest ye fall into condemnation.

Many scholars believe that in the previous verses Jesus tells his followers that swearing upon heaven or the earth is the same as swearing upon God because heaven and earth are the throne and footstool of God. In this verse Jesus makes clear that even swearing by one's own head is the equivalent of swearing by God because one's head is also under God's dominion since an individual cannot change the color of their hair. Schweizer notes that this passage does not take into account hair dye, which was a common and well known practice even in this era. Harrington disagrees, and believes this is an ironic reference to hair dye. While a person may change the color of the surface of their hair, underneath it remains unchanged. Just as one can change ones outward behavior, but it means nothing if the interior beliefs are not also changed. Nolland believes the reference to white hair may be linked to the honored state of elders in the society, and that dyeing hair white was thus an attempt to dissemble such a status. L.L. Welborn notes several parallel accounts of oath taking contemporaneous with the New Testament, particularly with Philo.

Preceded by Matthew 5:34	Gospel of Matthew; Chapter 5	Succeeded by Matthew 5:37
