= Matthew 5:34 =

- ← 5:33 5:35 →
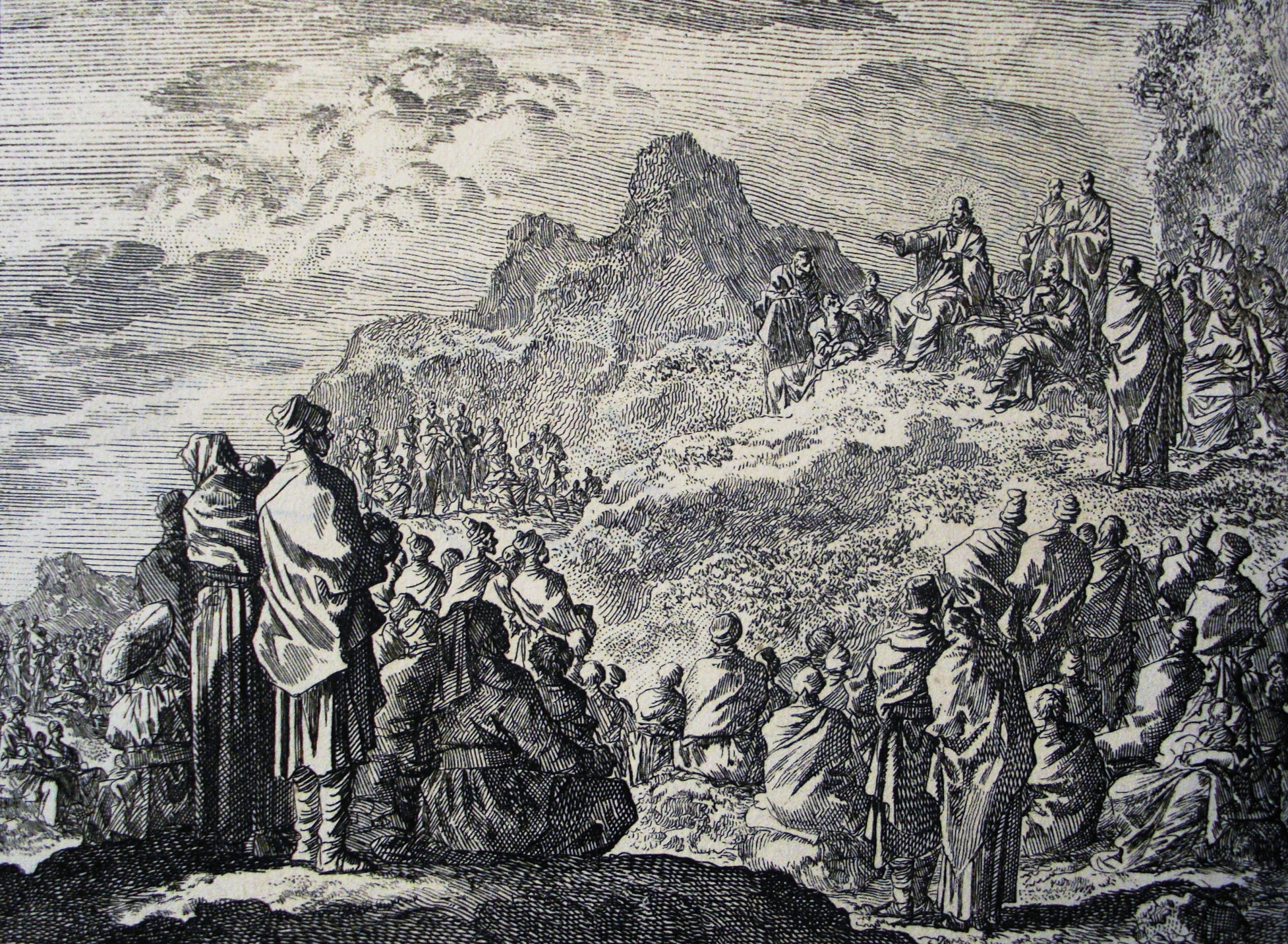
- "Sermon on the Mount". An etching by Jan Luyken from the Phillip Medhurst Collection of Bible illustrations housed at Belgrave Hall, Leicester, England.
- Book: Gospel of Matthew
- Christian Bible part: New Testament

Matthew 5:34 is the thirty-fourth verse of the fifth chapter of the Gospel of Matthew in the New Testament and is part of the Sermon on the Mount. This verse is part of either the third or fourth antithesis, the discussion of oaths.

== Content ==
In the King James Version of the Bible the text reads:

But I say unto you, Swear not at all;
neither by heaven; for it is God's throne:

— Matthew 5:34

The World English Bible translates the passage as:

but I tell you, don’t swear at all: neither
by heaven, for it is the throne of God;

The Novum Testamentum Graece text is:

ἐγὼ δὲ λέγω ὑμῖν μὴ ὀμόσαι ὅλως· μήτε ἐν τῷ οὐρανῷ, ὅτι θρόνος ἐστὶν τοῦ Θεοῦ

== Analysis ==
This verse departs somewhat from the structure of the previous Antitheses. The standard pattern was after presenting the former rule to present the new one, then explain it, then present examples. Here Jesus presents the new rule "swear not at all" and then moves directly to examples. The explanation for the new rule waits until Matthew 5:37.

Very few Christians interpret this verse literally to mean that all oaths are prohibited as in other parts of the Bible oaths are looked upon more favourably. In 2 Corinthians 1:23 and Galatians 1:20 Paul of Tarsus swears oaths, and in Hebrews 6:17 God himself swears an oath. Most Christian apologists have thus concluded that this verse is either Jesus using hyperbole to emphasize his point, or failing to mention exceptions to this rule that would have been implicit to his audience. Others interpret the original Greek as being less absolute than its English translations. Thus most Christian churches believe that only false and vain oaths are prohibited. John Calvin argued that only oaths counter to God are wrong. Several important Christian groups do not accept these caveats. Most notably the Quakers and Mennonites firmly reject all oaths, a stance that has led to their persecution by governments that insist on oath taking and has given rise to the allowance of an affirmation in its place. Tolstoy also understood this verse as banning all oaths, and it led him to support the abolition of all courts as a result.

The reference to Heaven as the Throne of God comes from Isaiah 66:1. Hill notes that while heaven in Matthew is often used as a periphrasis for God's name it is quite clearly not so used in this verse. At the time of Christ oaths were a much debated issue in the Jewish community. One view, expressed in M. Shebuoth, was that while oaths to God were binding, oaths to other subjects, such as heaven, were not. Schweizer thinks that Jesus is indicating here that swearing by heaven is swearing by God as heaven is God's throne.

== Commentary from the Church Fathers ==
Augustine: But what we could not understand by mere words, from the conduct of the saints we may gather in what sense should be understood what might easily be drawn the contrary way, unless explained by example. The Apostle has used oaths in his Epistles, and by this shows us how that ought to be taken, I say unto you, Swear not at all, namely, lest by allowing ourselves to swear at all we come to readiness in swearing, from readiness we come to a habit of swearing, and from a habit of swearing we fall into perjury. And so the Apostle is not found to have used an oath but only in writing, the greater thought and caution which that requires not allowing of slip of the tongue. Yet is the Lord's command so universal, Swear not at all, that He would seem to have forbidden it even in writing. But since it would be an impiety to accuse Paul of having violated this precept, especially in his Epistles, we must understand the word at all as implying that, as far as lays in your power, you should not make a practice of swearing, not aim at it as a good thing in which you should take delight.

Augustine: Therefore, in his writings, as writing allows of greater circumspection, the Apostle is found to have used an oath in several places, that none might suppose that there is any direct sin in swearing what is true; but only that our weak hearts are better preserved from perjury by abstaining from all swearing whatever.

Jerome: Lastly, consider that the Saviour does not here forbid to swear by God, but by the Heaven, the Earth, by Jerusalem, by a man's head. For this evil practice of swearing by the elements the Jews had always, and are thereof often accused in the prophetic writing's. For he who swears, shows either reverence or love for that by which he swears. Thus when the Jews swore by the Angels, by the city of Jerusalem, by the temple and the elements, they paid to the creature the honour and worship belonging to God; for it is commanded in the Law that we should not swear but by the Lord our God.

Chrysostom: Note how He exalts the elements of the world, not from their own nature, but from the respect which they have to God, so that there is opened no occasion of idolatry.

== See also ==
- Affirmation (law)
- Oath § Christian tradition

Preceded by Matthew 5:33	Gospel of Matthew; Chapter 5	Succeeded by Matthew 5:35
