= Turning the other cheek =

Phrase from the Sermon on the Mount in Christian doctrine

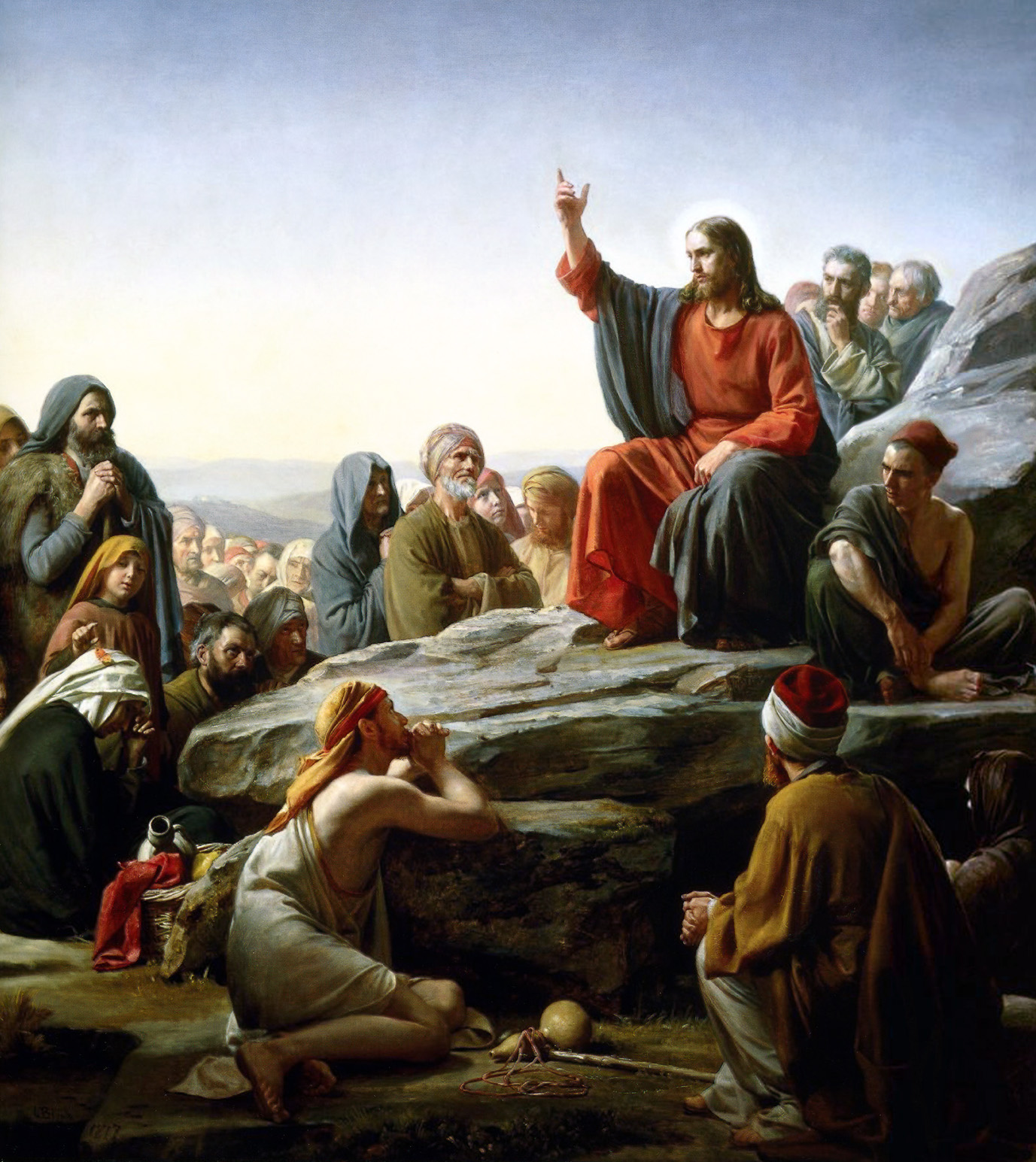
Jesus taught turning the other cheek during the Sermon on the Mount.

"Turn the other cheek" is a phrase in Christian doctrine from the Sermon on the Mount that refers to responding to insult without retort. This passage is variously interpreted as instructing the acceptance of one's predicament, commanding nonresistance, or advocating Christian pacifism.

== Scriptural references ==
The phrase originates from the Sermon on the Mount in the New Testament. In the Gospel of Matthew chapter 5, an alternative for "an eye for an eye" is given by Jesus:

^{38}You have heard that it was said, "An eye for an eye and a tooth for a tooth." ^{39}But I say to you, Do not resist the one who is evil. But if anyone slaps you on the right cheek, turn to him the other also. ^{40}And if anyone would sue you and take your tunic, let him have your cloak as well. ^{41}And if anyone forces you to go one mile, go with him two miles. ^{42}Give to the one who begs from you, and do not refuse the one who would borrow from you.

— Jesus Christ, English Standard Version (Matthew 5:38–42)

In the Sermon on the Plain in the Gospel of Luke chapter 6, as part of his command to "love your enemies", Jesus says:

^{27}But I say to you who hear, Love your enemies, do good to those who hate you, ^{28}bless those who curse you, pray for those who abuse you. ^{29}To one who strikes you on the cheek, offer the other also, and from one who takes away your cloak do not withhold your tunic either. ^{30}Give to everyone who begs from you, and from one who takes away your goods do not demand them back. ^{31}And as you wish that others would do to you, do so to them.

— Jesus Christ, English Standard Version (Luke 6:27–31)

== Parallels in the Pauline letters ==
The same non-retaliation ethic appears, in the same Greek construction (the verb ἀποδίδωμι, "repay," with the preposition ἀντί, "in place of"), in two letters of Paul the Apostle:

- 1 Thessalonians 5:15 — "See that no one repays (ἀποδίδωμι) another with (ἀντί) evil for evil, but always seek after that which is good."
- Romans 12:17, Romans 12:19–21 — "Never pay back (ἀποδίδωμι) evil for (ἀντί) evil to anyone. … Never take your own revenge … 'Vengeance is mine, I will repay,' says the Lord. … Do not be overcome by evil, but overcome evil with good."

Both letters are generally dated to the 50s AD and so were written before the Gospel of Matthew, and indeed before any of the canonical gospels reached written form. The verbal agreement is therefore usually taken to reflect a shared early Christian paraenetic tradition of non-retaliation rather than the letters' literary dependence on the Gospel.

== Old Testament background ==
Jesus's quotation "an eye for an eye and a tooth for a tooth" refers to three passages of the Mosaic lex talionis in which proportionate justice is applied to bodily harm: Exodus 21:24, Leviticus 24:20, and Deuteronomy 19:21. The Babylonian Talmud (Bava Kamma 83b) preserves evidence that "an eye for an eye" was already used in early Jewish discussion as a shorthand for these three texts.

== Greek text and the meaning of ἀντιστῆναι ==
A central exegetical question for this passage is what μὴ ἀντιστῆναι τῷ πονηρῷ (literally "do not ἀντιστῆναι the evil one") prohibits. The verb ἀντιστῆναι is the aorist infinitive of ἀνθίστημι, a compound of the preposition anti- ("against, in place of") and stenai ("to stand"). Matthias Konradt argues that the prefix anti- in v. 39 deliberately echoes the ἀντί of v. 38 ("eye in place of [ἀντί] eye"), so that the prohibition is not against resistance generally but against resistance in kind: "one should not resist the evildoer … by repaying in the same coin. [It is a] rejection of the principle [of] repaying evil with evil."

John Nolland reaches the same conclusion by a different route: the opening prohibition is incomplete in itself, and its positive counterpart must be deduced from the four examples that follow, none of which urges passive toleration. Nolland accordingly proposes the translation "you are not to set [yourself] against one who does evil," with the understanding that the form of "setting against" in view is specifically "retaliation in kind."

This reading is consistent with the apostolic letters' formulation of the same ethic, which uses the same ἀντί + ἀποδίδωμι ("repay") construction: 1 Thessalonians 5:15 ("no one repays another with [ἀντί] evil for evil") and Romans 12:17 ("never pay back evil for evil").

== Cultural context of the backhand slap ==
Scholars argue that the specification of the right cheek is exegetically significant: for a right-handed assailant facing the victim, striking the right cheek requires the back of the hand, which in Jewish honour-culture was the more dishonouring of the two strikes.

The Greek verb ῥαπίζειν, used in Matthew 5:39, refers not to serious bodily harm but to a public insult; it appears in 2 Corinthians 11:20 for a face-slap and in the Septuagint of Job 16:10 and Lamentations 3:30 for blows of public humiliation. The Mishnah (Bava Kamma 8:6) graduates the penalty accordingly — a forehand slap of the ear costs 200 zuz; a backhand 400.

W. D. Davies and Dale C. Allison Jr. note: "Matthew evidently mentions the right cheek in order to make plain that the reference is to the backhanded insult." Craig S. Keener adds that the response (freely turning the other cheek) "demonstrates that one does not value human honor," a refusal of the honour-shame logic that would otherwise demand legal redress for the insult. John Nolland describes the response as a deliberate alternative to counter-self-assertion: "the moral strength of the one who … signals his preference for suffering wrong over feeding the spiral of violence."

== Interpretations ==
This phrase, as with much of the Sermon on the Mount, has been subject to both literal and figurative interpretations.

=== Christian anarchist interpretation ===
According to this interpretation, the passages call for total nonresistance to the point of facilitating aggression against oneself, and since human governments defend themselves by military force, some have advocated for Christian anarchism, including Leo Tolstoy who elucidated his reasoning in his 1894 book The Kingdom of God Is Within You.

=== Nonviolent resistance interpretation ===
Scholars Amy-Jill Levine and Marc Brettler view the issue as justice following an injury. They argue that since the Greek word used in Matthew 5:39 for 'resist' is ἀντιστῆναι (referring to armed resistance or violent struggle), Jesus suggests to maintain one's honor and shame the perpetrator, instead of escalating violence or losing dignity. By offering the left cheek, the victim invites a right-handed jab which exposes the slap as a violent act that failed to degrade the victim, thus shaming the perpetrator for their cruel treatment.

The scholar Walter Wink, in his book Engaging the Powers: Discernment and Resistance in a World of Domination, interprets the passage as encouragement to subvert power structures of the time. For example, Wink interprets the next verse from the Sermon on the Mount as a way to make the oppressor break the law. The Roman postal law of Angaria allowed Roman authorities to demand that inhabitants of occupied territories carry messages and equipment for exactly one mile, but prohibited forcing them to go any further, else risk disciplinary action. In this situation, the nonviolent interpretation sees Jesus as criticizing an unjust and hated Roman law as well as clarifying the teaching to extend beyond Jewish law.

The "nonviolent resistance" reading has been engaged extensively in the scholarly literature. Nolland surveys it in his NIGTC commentary bibliography while himself concluding that the Matthean saying is "not necessarily an endorsement" of any single social-political strategy: the limited range of examples allows Jesus to "make the fundamental point in all sharpness without the need to grapple with the very real difficulty of defining boundaries of applicability." Jonathan T. Pennington argues for a virtue-ethical reading on similar grounds: "[Jesus] is not offering a new legal principle that overturns the Mosaic law. Rather, Jesus offers ethical wisdom. … These illustrations are just that; they are not to be applied without wise exceptions. The command to turn the other cheek does not envision the situation of a child and an abusive parent, for example."

== See also ==
- Christian pacifism
- Live by the sword, die by the sword
- Matthew 5:29, Matthew 10
- Tolstoyan
- Violence begets violence
- Just war theory
