= Matthew 5:33 =

- ← 5:32 5:34 →
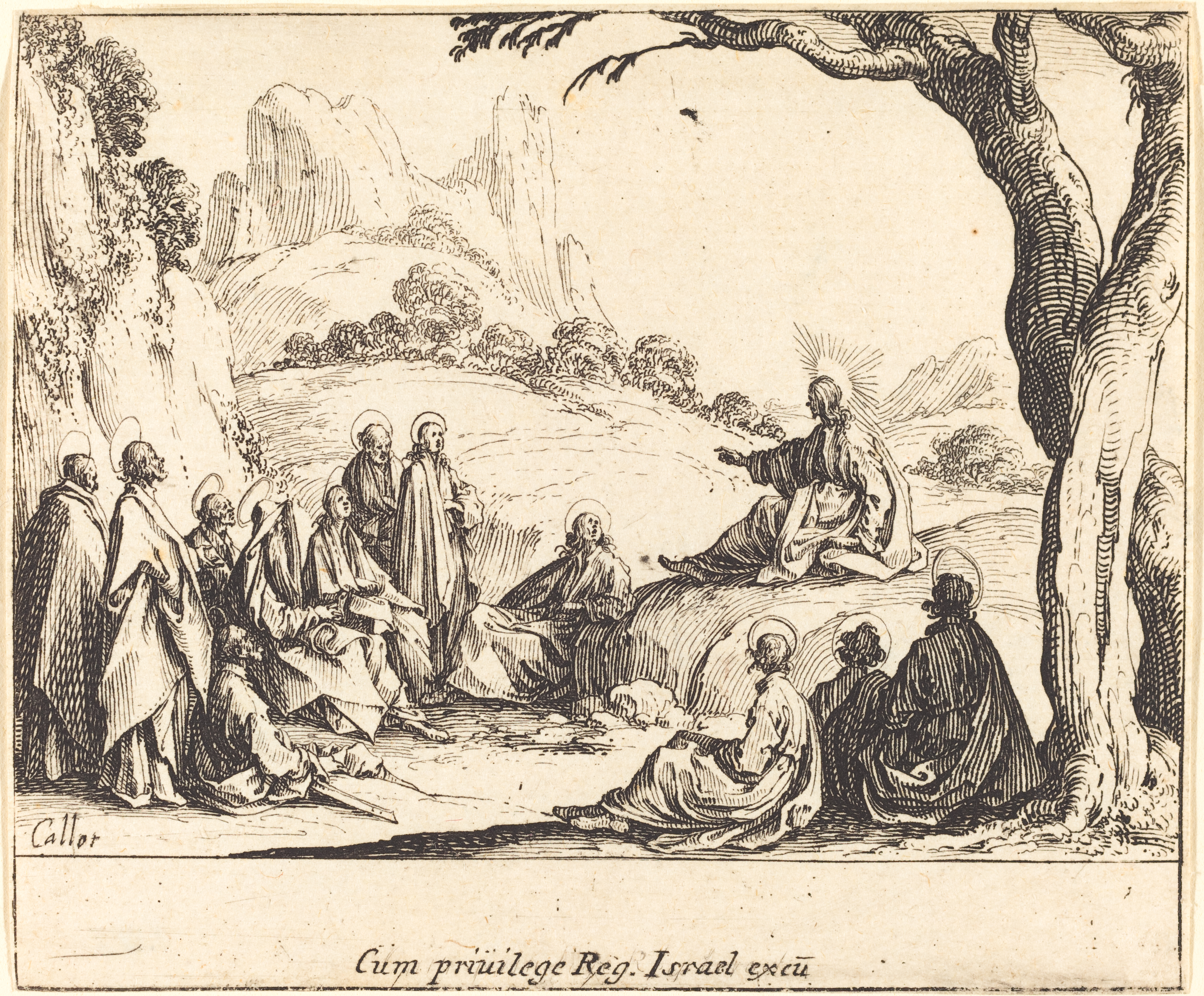
- "Sermon on the Mount", by Jacques Callot (1635).
- Book: Gospel of Matthew
- Christian Bible part: New Testament

Matthew 5:33 is the thirty-third verse of the fifth chapter of the Gospel of Matthew in the New Testament and is part of the Sermon on the Mount. This verse is the opening of the fourth antithesis, beginning the discussion of oaths.

== Content ==
In the King James Version of the Bible the text reads:

Again, ye have heard that it hath been said by
them of old time, Thou shalt not forswear thyself,
but shalt perform unto the Lord thine oaths:

The World English Bible translates the passage as:

"Again you have heard that it was said to them
of old time, 'You shall not make false vows,
but shall perform to the Lord your vows,'

The Novum Testamentum Graece text is:

Πάλιν ἠκούσατε ὅτι ἐρρέθη τοῖς ἀρχαίοις
Οὐκ ἐπιορκήσεις,
ἀποδώσεις δὲ τῷ Κυρίῳ τοὺς ὅρκους σου.

== Analysis ==
This verse moves the discussion from divorce to oaths. Gundry feels this was done by the author of Matthew as the discussion of oaths at Deuteronomy 23:22-24 comes just prior to the discussion of divorce beginning at Deuteronomy 24:1. Other scholars feel that the discussion of oaths naturally follows the discussion of divorce as one of the major legal issues of the day was over marriage vows.

Gundry notes that the introductory phrases of the antithesis has slowly been shrinking, in this verse it reverts to the full length of Matthew 5:21, renewed by the addition of the opening again. Unlike the previous antitheses this verse does not contain a direct quotation form the Old Testament, but similar sentiments are expressed in a number of places in the scripture and Hill reports that Mosaic law forbade "false and irreverent oaths." The first half of the quote seems to come from Leviticus 19:12 and the second half from Psalm 50 verse 14 with a mix of LXX wording and seemingly original translation. However, Psalm 50:14 is on vows, not oaths, and Matthew changes the word vow to oath. Jewish scholars made a distinction between the two concepts, but scholars argue this distinction was unclear and Numbers 30:12 seems to present them as essentially the same. Matthew's conflation of the two ideas is thus possible. Schweizer feels that the wording implies that Jesus is only discussing oaths associated with vows, and that he never speaks against the oaths of innocence or truthfulness that were not linked with vows.

The Greek term translated as "make false vows" in the WEB in Greek is epiorkeo. This literally means "commit perjury," but it can also mean "break an oath," which Hill feels is a much more reasonable translation. Albright and Mann translate it as the much less restrictive "do not make vows rashly."

== Commentary from the Church Fathers ==
Glossa Ordinaria: The Lord has hitherto taught to abstain from injuring our neighbour, forbidding anger with murder, lust with adultery, and the putting away a wife with a bill of divorce. He now proceeds to teach to abstain from injury to God, forbidding not only perjury as an evil in itself, but even all oaths as the cause of evil, saying, Ye have heard it said by them of old, Thou shall not forswear thyself. It is written in Leviticus, Thou shalt not forswear thyself in my name; (c. 19:12.) and that they should not make gods of the creature, they are commanded to render to God their oaths, and not to swear by any creature, Render to the Lord thy oaths; that is, if you shall have occasion to swear, you shall swear by the Creator and not by the creature. As it is written in Deuteronomy, Thou shall fear the Lord thy God, and shall swear by his name. (c. 6:13.)

Jerome: This was allowed under the Law, as to children; as they offered sacrifice to God, that they might not do it to idols, so they were permitted to swear by God; not that the thing was right, but that it were better done to God than to dæmons.

Pseudo-Chrysostom: For no man can swear often, but he must sometimes forswear himself; as he who has a custom of much speaking will sometimes speak foolishly.

Augustine: Inasmuch as the sin of perjury is a grievous sin, he must be further removed from it who uses no oath, than he who is ready to swear on every occasion, and the Lord would rather that we should not swear and keep close to the truth, than that swearing we should come near to perjury.

Augustine: This precept also confirms the righteousness of the Pharisees, not to forswear; inasmuch as he who swears not at all cannot forswear himself. But as to call God to witness is to swear, does not the Apostle break this commandment when he says several times to the Galatians, The things which I write unto you, behold, before God, I lie not. (Gal. 1:20.) So the Romans, God is my witness, whom I serve in my spirit. (Rom. 1:9) Unless perhaps some one may say, it is no oath unless I use the form of swearing by some object; and that the Apostle did not swear in saying, God is my witness. It is ridiculous to make such a distinction; yet the Apostle has used even this form, I die daily, by your boasting. (1 Cor. 15:31.) That this does not mean, your boasting has caused my dying daily, but is an oath, is clear from the Greek, which is νὴ τὴν ὑμετέραν καύχησιν.

Preceded by Matthew 5:32	Gospel of Matthew; Chapter 5	Succeeded by Matthew 5:34
