= Matthew 5:38 =

- ← 5:37 5:39 →
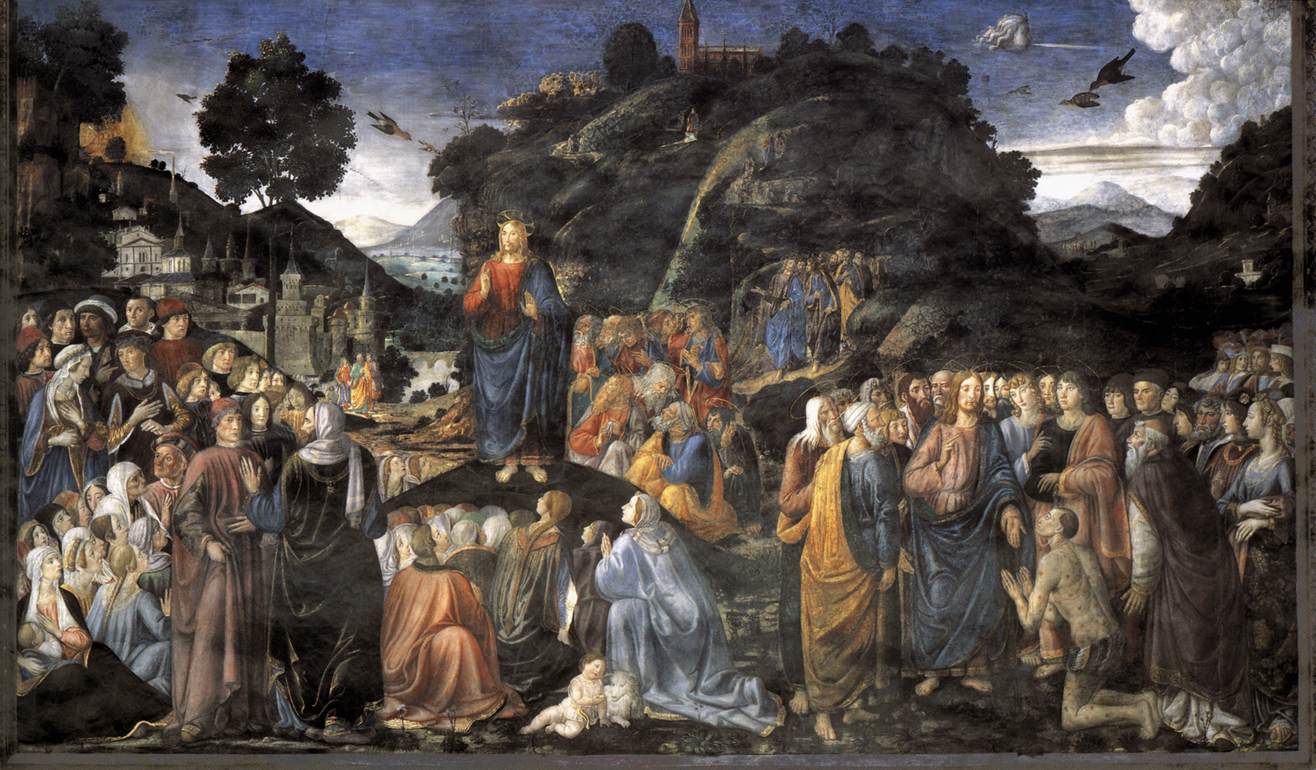
- "Sermon on the Mount" (between 1481 and 1482) by Cosimo Rosselli (1439–1507).
- Book: Gospel of Matthew
- Christian Bible part: New Testament

Matthew 5:38 is the thirty-eighth verse of the fifth chapter of the Gospel of Matthew in the New Testament and is part of the Sermon on the Mount. This verse begins the antithesis on the commandment: "Eye for an eye".

== Content ==
In the King James Version of the Bible the text reads:

Ye have heard that it hath been said,
An eye for an eye, and a tooth for a tooth:

The World English Bible translates the passage as:

“You have heard that it was said,
‘An eye for an eye, and a tooth for a tooth.’

The Novum Testamentum Graece text is:

Ἠκούσατε ὅτι ἐρρέθη
Ὀφθαλμὸν ἀντὶ ὀφθαλμοῦ καὶ ὀδόντα ἀντὶ ὀδόντος.

For a collection of other versions see BibleHub Matthew 5:38

== Analysis ==
This verse begins in the same style as the earlier antitheses, that natural desire for retaliation or vengeance can be conveniently justified with a reference to the Old Testament: An eye for an eye, and a tooth for a tooth, known as the principle of lex talionis ("the law of retribution"), is an ancient statement of the principle of retributive punishment dating back to the Code of Hammurabi. This phrasing appears several times in the Old Testament at Exodus 21:24, Leviticus 24:20, and Deuteronomy 19:21. This was a moderate rule compared with the blood feuds described in Genesis 4:23–24. The New Testament scholar R. T. France notes that by Jesus' era such punishments were no longer in practice, rather they had been replaced with fines judged to be of equal value to the damage caused. Thus, according to France, Jesus is not here condemning the violence or brutality of such punishments, but the very idea of retribution, which, together with the statement in the following few verses, forms the core of Jesus' teaching of nonviolence.

== Sources ==
- Allison, Dale C. Jr. (2007). "57. Matthew". In Barton, John; Muddiman, John (eds.). The Oxford Bible Commentary (first (paperback) ed.). Oxford University Press. pp. 844–886. ISBN 978-0199277186.
- Coogan, Michael David (2007). Coogan, Michael David; Brettler, Marc Zvi; Newsom, Carol Ann; Perkins, Pheme (eds.). The New Oxford Annotated Bible with the Apocryphal/Deuterocanonical Books: New Revised Standard Version, Issue 48 (Augmented 3rd ed.). Oxford University Press. ISBN 9780195288810.
- France, R. T. (1994). "Matthew". In Carson, D. A.; France, R. T.; Motyer, J. A.; Wenham, G. J. (eds.). New Bible Commentary: 21st Century Edition (4, illustrated, reprint, revised ed.). Inter-Varsity Press. pp. 904–945. ISBN 9780851106489.

| Preceded by Matthew 5:37 | Gospel of Matthew; Chapter 5 | Succeeded by Matthew 5:39 |
