= Matthew 5:31 =

- ← 5:30 5:32 →
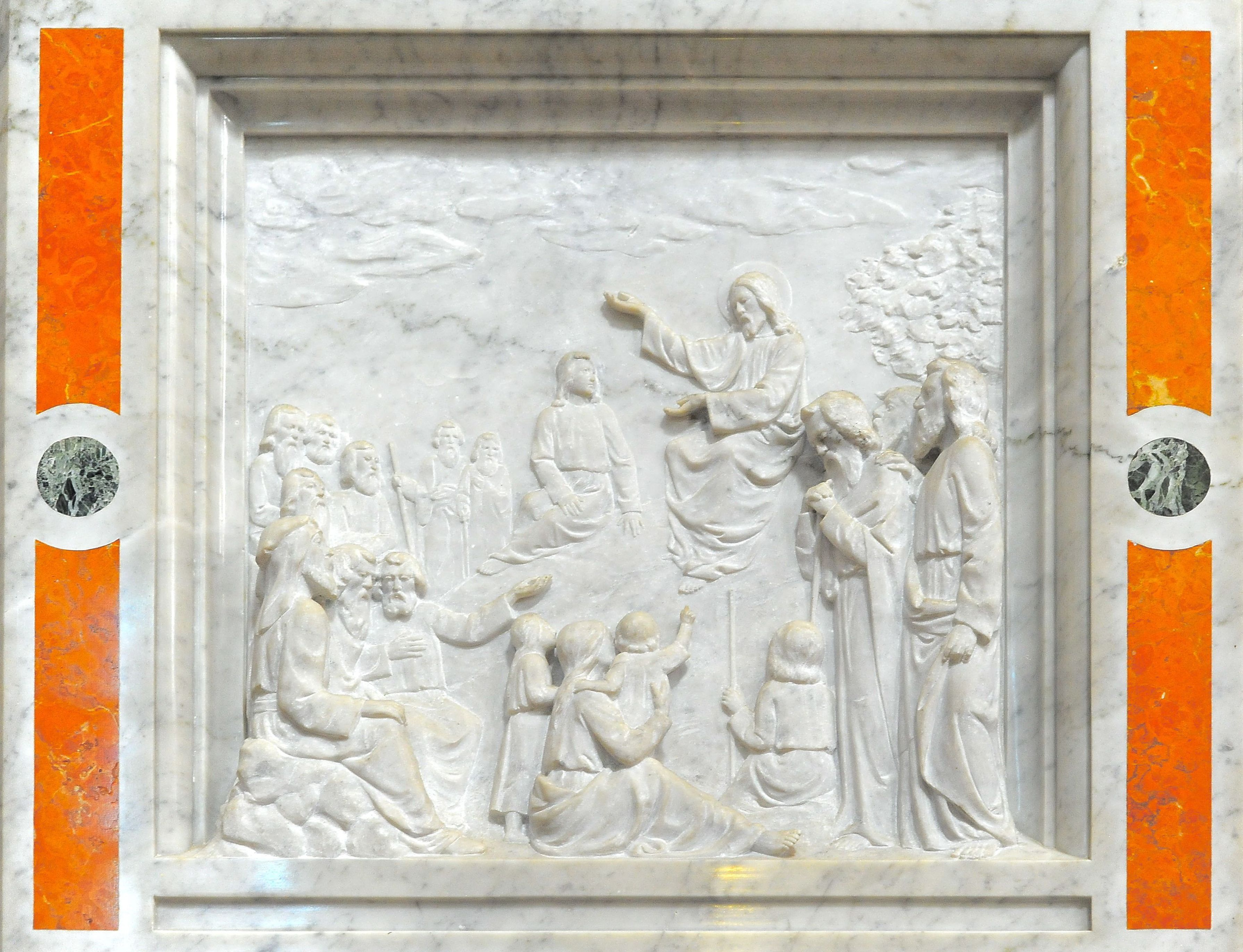
- "Sermon on the Mount" by Jožef Pavlin (1875-1914). Pulpit in the parish and pilgrimage church Saint Veit in Brezje, Slovenia.
- Book: Gospel of Matthew
- Christian Bible part: New Testament

Matthew 5:31 is the thirty-first verse of the fifth chapter of the Gospel of Matthew in the New Testament and is part of the Sermon on the Mount. This verse opens the brief, but much scrutinized, discussion of the issue of divorce.

== Content ==
In the King James Version of the Bible the text reads:

It hath been said, Whosoever shall put away his
wife, let him give her a writing of divorcement:

The World English Bible translates the passage as:

"It was also said, 'Whoever shall put away his
wife, let him give her a writing of divorce,'

The Novum Testamentum Graece text is:

Ἐρρέθη δέ Ὃς ἂν ἀπολύσῃ τὴν γυναῖκα αὐτοῦ,
δότω αὐτῇ ἀποστάσιον.

For a collection of other versions see BibleHub Matthew 5:31.

== Analysis ==
This verse opens with a truncated version of the opening of Matthew 5:27, which is itself a shorter version of the start of Matthew 5:21. Scholars are divided as to whether this is a separate antithesis, or whether it is simply an addendum to the discussion of adultery found in the previous verses. Jesus is here referring to Deuteronomy 24:1 that specifically condones divorce and also makes mention of a certificate that the husband gives to the wife to enact the separation. Divorce was acceptable among the Jewish community of the time, however what was permissible grounds for divorce was debated. As is implied by this verse only a man could initiate a divorce, and there was no need to go to court he simply had to announce his intentions. Instone-Brewer notes that the written certificate was important because it was legal proof that the wife could remarry and escape the poverty of being a single woman.

Keener notes that in Mark's version of this verse at Mark 10:12 Jesus makes reference to the possibility of a woman divorcing her husband. A female initiated divorce was impossible under Jewish law, but was permissible and common under Roman law. Keener feels this difference reflects the separate audiences for the two gospels, Matthew writes for a Jewish audience while Mark writes for a Greco-Roman one.

== Commentary from the Church Fathers ==
Glossa Ordinaria: The Lord had taught us above that our neighbour's wife was not to be coveted, He now proceeds to teach that our own wife is not to be put away.

Jerome: For touching Moses's allowance of divorce, the Lord and Saviour more fully explains in conclusion, that it was because of the hardness of the hearts of the husbands, not so much sanctioning discord, as checking bloodshed.

Pseudo-Chrysostom: For when Moses brought the children of Israel out of Egypt, they were indeed Hebrews in race, but Egyptians in manners. And it was caused by the Gentile manners that the husband hated the wife; and if he was not permitted to put her away, he was ready either to kill her or ill-treat her. Moses therefore suffered the bill of divorcement, not because it was a good practice in itself, but was the prevention of a worse evil.

== Bibliography ==
- France, R.T. The Gospel According to Matthew: an Introduction and Commentary. Leicester: Inter-Varsity, 1985.
- Gundry, Robert H. Matthew a Commentary on his Literary and Theological Art. Grand Rapids: William B. Eerdmans Publishing Company, 1982.
- Hill, David. The Gospel of Matthew. Grand Rapids: Eerdmans, 1981

Preceded by Matthew 5:30	Gospel of Matthew; Chapter 5	Succeeded by Matthew 5:32
