= Mirror punishment =

Poetic justice system

A mirror punishment is a penal form of poetic justice which reflects the nature or means of the crime in the means of (often physical) punishment as a form of retributive justice—the practice of "repaying" a wrongdoer "in kind".

It can be an application of the lex talionis (“an eye for an eye”), but is not always proportional justice, as a similar method may be used to produce a worse or milder effect than the crime for which it "retaliates".

The simplest method of mirror punishment is to enact the same action upon the criminal as the criminal perpetrated upon the victim. For example, thieves have the same amount of money taken from them as they stole, one who strikes another is struck in the same way, one who willfully causes another person's death is killed, and so on.

Often, however, a more esoteric method of mirror punishment is used, which implies punishing the part of the criminal's body used to commit the crime. Examples include the amputation of the hands of a thief, as permitted by Sharia law, and during the Middle Ages in Europe, or disabling the foot or leg of a runaway slave.

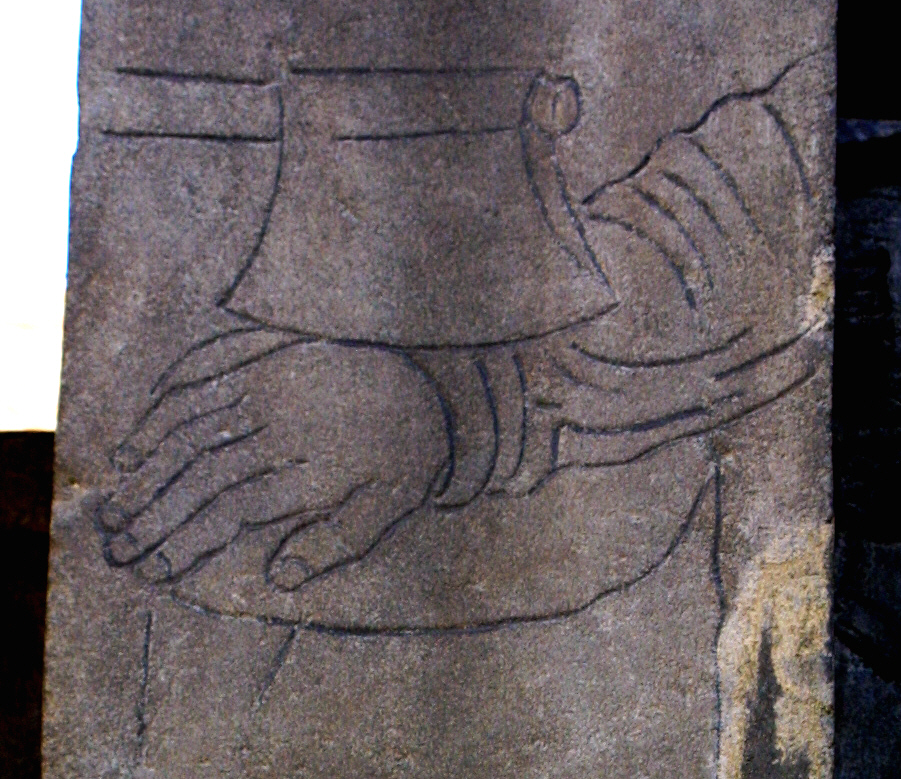

When the Halifax Gibbet was used as a method of execution, if the offender was to be executed for stealing an animal, a cord was fastened to the pin and tied to either the stolen animal or one of the same species, which was then driven off, withdrawing the pin and allowing the blade to drop.

Other examples include the punishment of adulterous women by the insertion of irritating substances into their vaginas (in the past hot pokers were sometimes used). A less extreme example is putting soap into a child's mouth for using inappropriate language (referred to in English as "washing out the mouth with soap").

Another method to accomplish "poetic justice" is to mirror the physical method of the crime, e.g., executing a murderer with his own weapon or burning arsonists alive.)

== Popular culture ==
W. S. Gilbert's comic opera The Mikado contains a song satirizing mirror punishment:

The billiard-sharp who anyone catches
His doom’s extremely hard—
He’s made to dwell
In a dungeon cell
On a spot that’s always barred.
And there he plays extravagant matches
In fitless finger-stalls,
On a cloth untrue
With a twisted cue
And elliptical billiard balls.

The refrain line "to let the punishment fit the crime" has sometimes been quoted in the course of British political debates, though the concept predates Gilbert.

== See also ==
- Contrapasso
