= The Extra Mile (disambiguation) =

The Extra Mile – Points of Light Volunteer Pathway is a national monument in Washington D.C.

The Extra Mile or Extra Mile may also refer to:

== Arts and education ==
=== Music ===
- Extra Mile (album), a 1990 album by Shenandoah
- The Extra Mile, a 1992 album by Al Denson
- "The Extra Mile", a song on Tra te e il mare, 2000 Laura Pausini album
- "The Extra Mile", a song on Things Go Better with RJ and AL, 2006 Soul Position album
- "The Extra Mile", a song on This Is Where I Came In, 2001 Bee Gees album
- "Extra Mile", song on Deeper Water, a 1995 Paul Kelly album

=== Television ===
- "The Extra Mile" (Drive episode)
- "The Extra Mile", an episode of the TV series All Saints
- "Extra Mile", an episode of Murphy's Law

== Printed material ==
- The Extra Mile (short story collection), a 1962 book of selected short stories by Ivy R. Doherty
- The Extra Mile (magazine), a publication of Southern New Hampshire University
- The Extra Mile: One Woman's Personal Journey to Ultra-Running Greatness, a book by Pam Reed
- The Extra Mile: My Autobiography, a book by Kevin Sinfield published in March 2023

== Other uses ==
- Extra Mile Endurathon, a walking endurance event
- Extra Mile Education Foundation, an educational charity founded 1989 in Pittsburgh, Pennsylvania, USA
- To go the extra mile, an idiom about the Roman mile meaning to do more than is required

== See also ==
- "My Extra Mile", an episode of the TV series Scrubs
- Plus ultra (motto)
- "That Extra Mile", 1994 single by The Winans
- "That Extra Mile", 2004 single by Ricky
