= Matthew 5:37 =

- ← 5:36 5:38 →
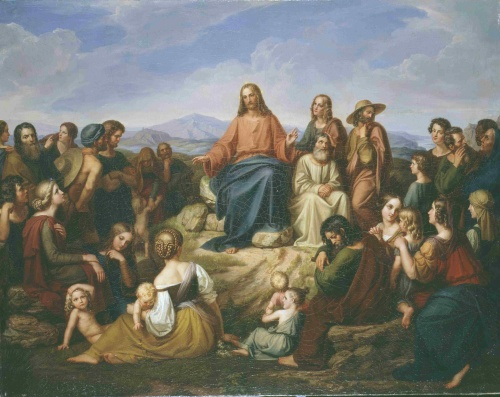
- "Sermon on the Mount" (De Bergrede) by Carl Joseph Begas, circa 1820, England.
- Book: Gospel of Matthew
- Christian Bible part: New Testament

Matthew 5:37 is the thirty-seventh verse of the fifth chapter of the Gospel of Matthew in the New Testament and is part of the Sermon on the Mount. This verse is part of either the third or fourth antithesis, the final part of the discussion of oaths.

== Content ==
In the King James Version of the Bible the text reads:

But let your communication be, Yea, yea; Nay, nay:
for whatsoever is more than these cometh of evil.

The World English Bible translates the passage as:

But let your ‘Yes’ be ‘Yes’ and your ‘No’ be ‘No.’
Whatever is more than these is of the evil one.

The Novum Testamentum Graece text is:

ἔστω δὲ ὁ λόγος ὑμῶν ναὶ ναί, οὒ οὔ
τὸ δὲ περισσὸν τούτων ἐκ τοῦ πονηροῦ ἐστιν.

For a collection of other versions see BibleHub Matthew 5:37

== Analysis ==
The exact meaning of this verse is much disputed. One reading is that one should simply answer requests with yes or no, and that anything extra, such as oaths, results in evil. This is very similar to a passage at James 5:12, which quite clearly has this meaning. For the Christian a simple yes or no should be sufficient, no oaths are required as they are to be trusted even without them. This is the most common understanding, and the WEB translation makes this view explicit.

However, the original Greek has the double word format shown in the KJV. The Slavonic Enoch states that a double yes or a double no were themselves forms of oath. By this understanding Jesus is not banning all oaths, but is stating that only this one form of oath is permissible. Theologian R.T. France believed the double words are simply a Semiticism that indicates the word is meant to be used on its own.

There are also multiple understandings of the final phrase. In Matthew 13:19, and in other parts of the New Testament, "Evil One" is used as a name for Satan. Scholar Eduard Schweizer believes that in this instance the gospel of Matthew describes Jesus saying that swearing was evil, not Satanic. Theologically, there is little difference between these interpretations.

== Commentary from the Church Fathers ==
Rabanus Maurus: Having forbidden swearing, He instructs us how we ought to speak, Let your speech be yea, yea; nay, nay. That is, to affirm any thing it is sufficient to say, ‘It is so:’ to deny, to say, ‘It is not so.’ Or, yea, yea; nay, nay, are therefore twice repeated, that what you affirm with the mouth you should prove in deed, and what you deny in word, you should not establish by your conduct.

Hilary of Poitiers: Otherwise; They who live in the simplicity of the faith have not need to swear, with them ever, what is is, what is not is not; by this their life and their conversation are ever preserved in truth.

Jerome: Therefore Evangelic verity does not admit an oath, since the whole discourse of the faithful is instead of an oath.

Augustine: And he who has learned that an oath is to be reckoned not among things good, but among things necessary, will restrain himself as much as he may, not to use an oath without necessity, unless he sees men loth to believe what it is for their good they should believe, without the confirmation of an oath. This then is good and to be desired, that our conversation be only, yea, yea; nay, nay; for what is more than this cometh of evil. That is, if you are compelled to swear, you know that it is by the necessity of their weakness to whom you would persuade any thing; which weakness is surely an evil. What is more than this is thus evil; not that you do evil in this just use of an oath to persuade another to something beneficial for him; but it is an evil in him whose weakness thus obliges you to use an oath.

Chrysostom: Or; of evil, that is, from their weakness to whom the Law permitted the use of an oath. Not that by this the old Law is signified to be from the Devil, but He leads us from the old imperfection to the new abundance.

Preceded by Matthew 5:36	Gospel of Matthew; Chapter 5	Succeeded by Matthew 5:38
