= Retributive justice =

Type of punishment

Retributive justice is a legal concept whereby the criminal offender receives punitive damages proportional or similar to the crime. As opposed to revenge, retribution—and thus retributive justice—is not personal, is directed only at wrongdoing, has inherent limits, involves no pleasure at the suffering of others (e.g., schadenfreude, sadism), and employs procedural standards. Retributive justice contrasts with other purposes of punishment such as deterrence (prevention of future crimes), exile (prevention of opportunity) and rehabilitation of the offender.

The concept is found in most world cultures and in many ancient texts. Classical texts advocating the retributive view include Cicero's De Legibus (1st century BC), Immanuel Kant's Science of Right (1790), and Georg Wilhelm Friedrich Hegel's Elements of the Philosophy of Right (1821). The presence of retributive justice in ancient Jewish culture is shown by its mention in the law of Moses, which refers to the punishments of "life for life, eye for eye, tooth for tooth, hand for hand, foot for foot" as also attested in the Code of Hammurabi from early Babylonia. Documents assert similar values in other cultures, though the judgment of whether a particular punishment is appropriately severe can vary greatly across cultures and individuals in accord with circumstance.

== Purposes ==
Some purposes of official retribution include:

- To channel the retributive sentiments of the public into the political and legal systems. The intent is to deter people from resorting to lynchings, blood feuds, and other forms of vigilante self-help.
- To promote Social Solidarity through participation in the act of punishing, under the theory that "the society that slays together stays together."
- To prevent a situation in which a citizen who would have preferred to obey the law as part of his civic responsibility decides that he would be a fool to not violate it, when so many others are getting away with lawlessness that the point of his obedience is mostly defeated.
- To punish an offender proportional to the seriousness of the offense regardless of individual differences.

== History ==
In all ancient legal systems, retribution for wrongdoing took precedence over the enforcement of rights. A sense of natural law demanded that a criminal should be punished with similar loss and pain as they inflicted on their victim. Therefore, the concept of lex talionis (an eye for an eye) was common in ancient law. The Code of Hammurabi includes the oldest extant example of lex talionis, and the Hebrew Bible also includes a commandment: middah ke-neged middah (law of 'measure for measure'). The Roman lawyer and philosopher Cicero proposed "let the punishment fit the offence" (Latin: noxiae poena par esto), giving examples of violence being punished by death, fines being imposed on those convicted of greed etc.

In the late 18th century, the philosopher Immanuel Kant argued that retribution is the only legitimate form of punishment the court can prescribe:

Judicial punishment can never be used merely as a means to promote some other good for the criminal himself or for civil society, but instead it must in all cases be imposed on him only on the ground that he has committed a crime.

— Metaphysics of Morals § 49 E.

Kant regarded punishment as a matter of justice, which must be carried out by the state for the sake of the law, not for the sake of the criminal or the victim. He argues that if the guilty are not punished, justice is not done and if justice is not done, then the idea of law itself is undermined.

One of the reasons for the abandonment of retribution by many legal systems in the 20th century was the abandonment of the concept of personal autonomy, which had become discredited. While retributive justice is usually considered as a cornerstone of criminal punishment, it has been shown that it also plays a role in private law.

== Principles ==
According to the Stanford Encyclopedia of Philosophy, retributive justice is committed to three principles:

- "Those who commit certain kinds of wrongful acts, paradigmatically serious crimes, morally deserve to suffer a proportionate punishment."
- It is "intrinsically morally good—good without reference to any other goods that might arise—if some legitimate punisher gives [those who commit certain kinds of wrongful acts] the punishment they deserve."
- "It is morally impermissible intentionally to punish the innocent or to inflict disproportionately large punishments on wrongdoers."

=== Proportionality ===
Proportionality requires that the level of punishment be related to the severity of the offending behaviour. An accurate reading of the biblical phrase "an eye for an eye" in Exodus and Leviticus is said to be: "only one eye for one eye", or "an eye in place of an eye." However, this does not mean that the punishment has to be equivalent to the crime. A retributive system must punish severe crimes more harshly than minor crimes, but retributivists differ about how harsh or soft the system should be overall. The crime's level of severity can be determined in multiple ways. Severity can be determined by the amount of harm, unfair advantage or the moral imbalance that the crime caused.

Traditionally, philosophers of punishment have contrasted retributivism with utilitarianism. For utilitarians, punishment is forward-looking, justified by a purported ability to achieve future social benefits, such as crime reduction. For retributionists, punishment is backward-looking, justified by the crime that has already been committed. Therefore, punishment is carried out to atone for the damage already done.

== Subtypes ==
Retributive justice is of two distinct types. The classical definition embraces the idea that the amount of punishment must be proportionate to the amount of harm caused by the offence. A more recent version advocated by philosopher Michael Davis asserts that the amount of punishment must be proportionate to the amount of unfair advantage gained by the wrongdoer. Davis introduced this version of retributive justice in the early 1980s, at a time when retributive justice was resurging within the philosophy of law community, perhaps due to the failings of reform theory in prior decades.

A retributive justice system's assessment of blameworthiness (or lack thereof) can either justify punishment or serve merely to limit the punishments society imposes for other reasons.

== Criticisms ==
Many jurisdictions that adopt retributive justice, especially in the United States, use mandatory sentencing, where judges impose a penalty for a crime within the range set by the law. However, judges have limited discretion to consider mitigating factors, leading to lesser penalties under certain circumstances.

When the punishment involves a fine, the theory does not allow the financial position of an offender to be considered, leading to situations in which a poor individual and a millionaire could be forced to pay the same amount. Such a fine would be punitive for the poor offender while insignificant for the millionaire. Instead of pure retribution, many jurisdictions use variants such as the European Union's emphasis on punitive equality, which base the amount of a fine not just on the offense but also on the offender's income, salary, and ability to pay. Consequently, in 2002, a senior Finnish executive at Nokia was given a fine of €116,000 (US$103,000) on a traffic ticket issued for driving 75 km/h (47 mph) in a 50 km/h (31 mph) zone, based on his income of €14 million (US $12.5 million) per year. Similarly, a Finnish businessman was required to pay €54,000 based on his yearly income of €6.5 million, making the fine equally punitive as a typical €200 (US$246) fine for the same offense would have been had it been issued to a Finn earning an average salary. The retributive theory's lack of consideration of the perpetrator's and victim's status has led many jurisdictions to move away from it in various ways, including punitive equality and taking into consideration the status and wealth, or lack of status and wealth, of an offender and their consequent ability to both pay fines and defend themselves effectively in court.

One critique of some concepts of just deserts is that they are primitive, emphasizing social harm rather than the character and culpability of offenders, e.g., California's 1976 statute calling for "terms proportionate to the seriousness of the offense with provision for uniformity in the sentences of offenders committing the same offense under similar circumstances." More generally, prioritizing justice for the public over crime control goals has come under criticism as attributable more to the relative ease of writing sentencing guidelines as crime tariffs (as opposed to describing the appropriate influence of situational and personal characteristics on punishment) than to any sound arguments about penological theory.

== Alternatives ==
Traditional alternatives to retributive justice have been exile and shunning. In pre-modern societies such sentences were often the equivalent of the death penalty as individuals would find it impossible to survive without the support and protection of the society that they had wronged.

Modern alternatives to retributive measures include utilitarian justice, psychiatric imprisonment, restorative justice and transformative justice. A general overview of criminal justice puts each of these ideals in context.

One libertarian approach to this issue argues that full restitution (in the broad, rather than technical legal, sense) is compatible with both retributivism and a utilitarian degree of deterrence.

== See also ==
- Capital punishment
- Cycle of violence
- Eye for an eye
- Penal harm
- Proportionality (law)
- "Two wrongs make a right"
