= Eye for an eye =

Expression for proportional punishment

"An eye for an eye" (Biblical Hebrew: עַיִן תַּחַת עַיִן, ʿayin taḥaṯ ʿayin) (Note: From Exodus 21: 22 If men strive, and hurt a woman with child, so that her fruit depart from her, and yet no mischief follow: he shall be surely punished, according as the woman's husband will lay upon him; and he shall pay as the judges determine. 23 And if any mischief follow, then thou shalt give life for life, 24 Eye for eye, tooth for tooth, hand for hand, foot for foot, 25 Burning for burning, wound for wound, stripe for stripe. See also: Leviticus 24: 19 And if a man cause a blemish in his neighbour; as he hath done, so shall it be done to him; 20 Breach for breach, eye for eye, tooth for tooth: as he hath caused a blemish in a man, so shall it be done to him again.; Deuteronomy 19:21: And thine eye shall not pity; but life shall go for life, eye for eye, tooth for tooth, hand for hand, foot for foot.) is a commandment found in the Book of Exodus 21:23–27 expressing the principle of reciprocal justice measure for measure. The earliest known use of the principle appears in the Code of Hammurabi, which predates the writing of the Hebrew Bible.

The law of exact retaliation (Latin: lex talionis), or reciprocal justice, bears the same principle that a person who has injured another person is to be penalized to a similar degree by the injured party. In softer interpretations, it means the victim receives the estimated value of the injury in compensation. The intent behind the principle was to restrict compensation to the value of the loss.

== Definition and methods ==
The term lex talionis does not always refer to literal eye-for-an-eye codes of justice (see mirror punishment), but rather applies to the broader class of legal systems that formulate penalties for specific crimes, which are thought to be fitting in their severity. Some propose that this was at least in part intended to prevent excessive punishment at the hands of either an avenging private party, or the state. The most common expression of lex talionis is "an eye for an eye", but other interpretations have been given as well. Legal codes following the principle of lex talionis have one thing in common – prescribed 'fitting' counter punishment for a felony. The simplest example is the "eye for an eye" principle. In that case, the rule was that punishment must be exactly equal to the crime.

== In Babylonian law ==
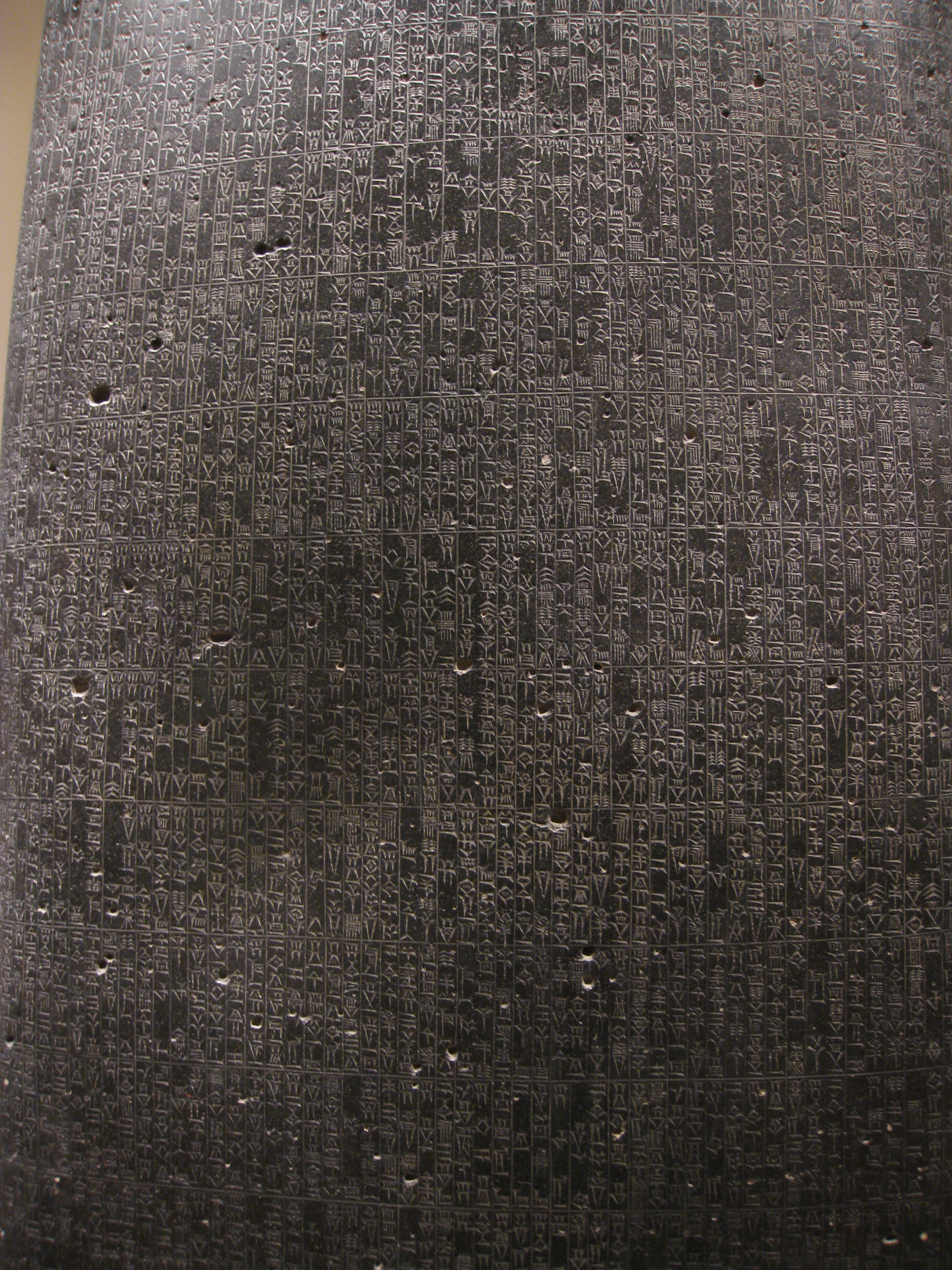
In the laws of Hammurabi, an eye for an eye was applied if a free man (avīlum) gouged out the eye/broke the bone of another free man of equal status; otherwise, a monetary penalty was paid.

In the legal Code of Hammurabi, the principle of exact reciprocity is very clearly used. For example, if a person caused the death of another person, the killer would be put to death.

Various ideas regarding the origins of this law exist, but a common one is that it developed as early civilizations grew and a less well-established system for retribution of wrongs, feuds and vendettas, threatened the social fabric. Despite having been replaced with newer modes of legal theory, lex talionis systems served a critical purpose in the development of social systems—the establishment of a body whose purpose was to enact the retaliation and ensure that this was the only punishment. This body was the state in one of its earliest forms. The principle can be found in earlier Mesopotamian law codes such as the Codes of Ur-Nammu of Ur and Lipit-Ištar of Isín.

The principle is found in Babylonian Law. If it is surmised that in societies not bound by the rule of law, if a person was hurt, then the injured person (or their relative) would take vengeful retribution on the person who caused the injury. The retribution might be worse than the crime, perhaps even death. Babylonian law put a limit on such actions, restricting the retribution to be no worse than the crime, as long as victim and offender occupied the same status in society. As with blasphemy or lèse-majesté (crimes against a god or a monarch), crimes against one's social betters were punished more severely.

== In ancient Greek law ==
Anaximander, teacher of Pythagoras: "The grand periodicities of nature are conceived of enacting cycles of retaliatory retribution."

== In Hebrew law ==
The law of the Hebrews rejected this law; the Hebrew Bible allows for kofer (a monetary payment) to take the place of a bodily punishment for any crime except murder. It is not specified whether the victim, accused, or judge had the authority to choose kofer in place of bodily punishment.

The idiomatic biblical phrase Hebrew: עין תחת עין, romanized: ayin tachat ayin in Exodus and Leviticus literally means 'one eye under/(in place of) one eye' while a slightly different phrase (עַיִן בְּעַיִן שֵׁן בְּשֵׁן, literally 'eye for an eye; tooth for a tooth' ...) is used in another passage (Deuteronomy) in the context of possible reciprocal court sentences for failed false witnesses. The "only one eye for one eye" was to restrict compensation to the value of the loss.

The English translation of a passage in Leviticus states, "And a man who injures his countryman – as he has done, so it shall be done to him [namely,] fracture under/for fracture, eye under/for eye, tooth under/for tooth. Just as another person has received injury from him, so it will be given to him." (Lev. 24:19–21). For an example of תחת being used in its regular sense of 'under', see Lev. 22:27 "A bull, sheep or goat, when it is born shall remain under its mother, and from the eighth day..."

An English translation of Exodus 21:22–24 states: "If men strive, and hurt a woman with child, so that her fruit depart from her, and yet no mischief follow: he shall be surely punished, according as the woman's husband will lay upon him; and he shall pay as the judges determine. And if any mischief follow, then thou shalt give life for life, eye for eye, tooth for tooth, hand for hand, foot for foot."

=== Judaism ===
Isaac Kalimi said that the lex talionis was "humanized" by the Rabbis who interpreted "an eye for an eye" to mean reasonable pecuniary compensation. As in the case of the Babylonian lex talionis, ethical Judaism and humane Jewish jurisprudence replaces the peshat (literal meaning) of the written Torah. Pasachoff and Littman point to the reinterpretation of the lex talionis as an example of the ability of Pharisaic Judaism to "adapt to changing social and intellectual ideas."

==== Talmud ====
The Talmud interprets the verses referring to "an eye for an eye" and similar expressions as mandating monetary compensation in tort cases and argues against the interpretations by Sadducees that the Bible verses refer to physical retaliation in kind, using the argument that such an interpretation would be inapplicable to blind or eyeless offenders. Since the Torah requires that penalties be universally applicable, the phrase cannot be interpreted in this manner.

The Oral Law explains, based upon the biblical verses, that the Bible mandates a sophisticated five-part monetary form of compensation, consisting of payment for "Damages, Pain, Medical Expenses, Incapacitation, and Mental Anguish" — which underlies many modern legal codes. Some rabbinic literature explains, moreover, that the expression, "An eye for an eye, etc." suggests that the perpetrator deserves to lose his own eye, but that biblical law treats him leniently. − Paraphrased from the Union of Orthodox Congregations.

However, the Torah also discusses a form of direct reciprocal justice, where the phrase ayin tachat ayin makes another appearance. Here, the Torah discusses false witnesses who conspire to testify against another person. The Torah requires the court to "do to him as he had conspired to do to his brother". Assuming the fulfillment of certain technical criteria (such as the sentencing of the accused whose punishment was not yet executed), wherever it is possible to punish the conspirators with exactly the same punishment through which they had planned to harm their fellow, the court carries out this direct reciprocal justice (including when the punishment constitutes the death penalty). Otherwise, the offenders receive lashes.

Since there is no form of punishment in the Torah that calls for the maiming of an offender (punitory amputation) there is no case where a conspiratorial false witness could possibly be punished by the court literally injuring his eye, tooth, hand, or foot. There is one case where the Torah states "…and you shall cut off her hand…" The sages of the Talmud understood the literal meaning of this verse as referring to a case where the woman is attacking a man in potentially lethal manner. This verse teaches that, although one must intervene to save the victim, one may not kill a lethal attacker if it is possible to neutralize that attacker through non-lethal injury. Regardless, there is no verse that even appears to mandate injury to the eye, tooth, or foot.

Numbers 35:9–30 discusses the only form of remotely reciprocal justice not carried out directly by the court, where, under very limited circumstances, someone found guilty of negligent manslaughter may be killed by a relative of the deceased who takes on the role of "redeemer of blood". In such cases, the court requires the guilty party to flee to a designated city of refuge. While the guilty party is there, the "redeemer of blood" may not kill him. If, however, the guilty party illegally forgoes his exile, the "redeemer of blood", as an accessory of the court, may kill the guilty party.

According to traditional Jewish Law, application of these laws requires the presence and maintenance of the biblically designated cities of refuge, as well as a conviction in an eligible court of 23 judges as delineated by the Torah and Talmud. The latter condition is also applicable for any capital punishment. These circumstances have not existed for approximately 2,000 years.

==== Objective of reciprocal justice in Judaism ====
The Talmud discusses the concept of justice as measure-for-measure retribution (middah k'neged middah) in the context of divinely implemented justice. Regarding reciprocal justice by court, however, the Torah states that punishments serve to remove dangerous elements from society ("…and you shall eliminate the evil from your midst") and to deter potential criminals from violating the law ("And the rest shall hear and be daunted, and they shall no longer commit anything like this evil deed in your midst"). Additionally, reciprocal justice in tort cases serves to compensate the victim (see above).

The ideal of vengeance for the sake of assuaging the distress of the victim plays no role in the Torah's conception of court justice, as victims are cautioned against even hating or bearing a grudge against those who have harmed them. The Torah makes no distinction between whether or not the potential object of hatred or a grudge has been brought to justice, and all people are taught to love their fellow Israelites.

==== Social hierarchy and reciprocal justice ====
In Exodus 21, as in the Code of Hammurabi, the concept of reciprocal justice seemingly applies to social equals; the statement of reciprocal justice "life for life, eye for eye, tooth for tooth, hand for hand, foot for foot, burn for burn, wound for wound, stripe for stripe" is followed by an example of a different law: if a slave-owner blinds the eye or knocks out the tooth of a slave, the slave is freed but the owner pays no other consequence. On the other hand, the slave would probably be put to death for the injury of the eye of the slave-owner.

However the reciprocal justice applies across social boundaries: the "eye for eye" principle is directly followed by the proclamation "You are to have one law for the alien and the citizen." This shows a much more meaningful principle for social justice, in that the marginalized in society were given the same rights under the social structure. In this context, the reciprocal justice in an ideal functioning setting, according to Harvard Divinity School lecturer Michael Coogan, "to prevent people from taking the law into their own hands and exacting disproportionate vengeance for offenses committed against them."

== In Roman law ==
Classical texts advocating the retributive view include Cicero's De Legibus, written in the 1st century BC.

Roman law moved toward monetary compensation as a substitute for vengeance. In cases of assault, fixed penalties were set for various injuries, although talio was still permitted if one person broke another's limb.

== In Islamic law ==
The Quran (Q5:45) mentions the "eye for an eye" concept as being ordained for the Children of Israel. The principle of lex talionis in Islam is Qiṣāṣ (Arabic: قصاص) as mentioned in Qur'an, 2:178: "O you who have believed, prescribed for you is legal retribution (Qisas) for those murdered – the free for the free, the slave for the slave, and the female for the female. But whoever overlooks from his brother anything, then there should be a suitable follow-up and payment to him with good conduct. This is an alleviation from your Lord and a mercy. But whoever transgresses after that will have a painful punishment." Muslim countries that use Islamic Sharia law, such as Iran or Saudi Arabia, apply the "eye for an eye" rule literally.

In the Torah We prescribed for them a life for a life, an eye for an eye, a nose for a nose, an ear for an ear, a tooth for a tooth, an equal wound for a wound: if anyone forgoes this out of charity, it will serve as atonement for his bad deeds. Those who do not judge according to what God has revealed are doing grave wrong.

— Al-Ma'ida Qurʾān, 5:45

In 2017, an Iranian woman wounded in an acid attack was given the opportunity to have her attacker blinded with acid per Sharia law.

== Applications ==
- The death penalty is applied to murderers in some jurisdictions, and is generally restricted to murderers in some, such as the United States. In Islamic penal jurisprudence, it is a consequence of the qisas principle.
- The paramilitary group Nakam sought to kill six million Germans as revenge for the six million Jews killed during the Holocaust.
- U.S. President Donald Trump has described "an eye for an eye" as his favorite Bible verse.

== Criticism ==
=== In the New Testament ===
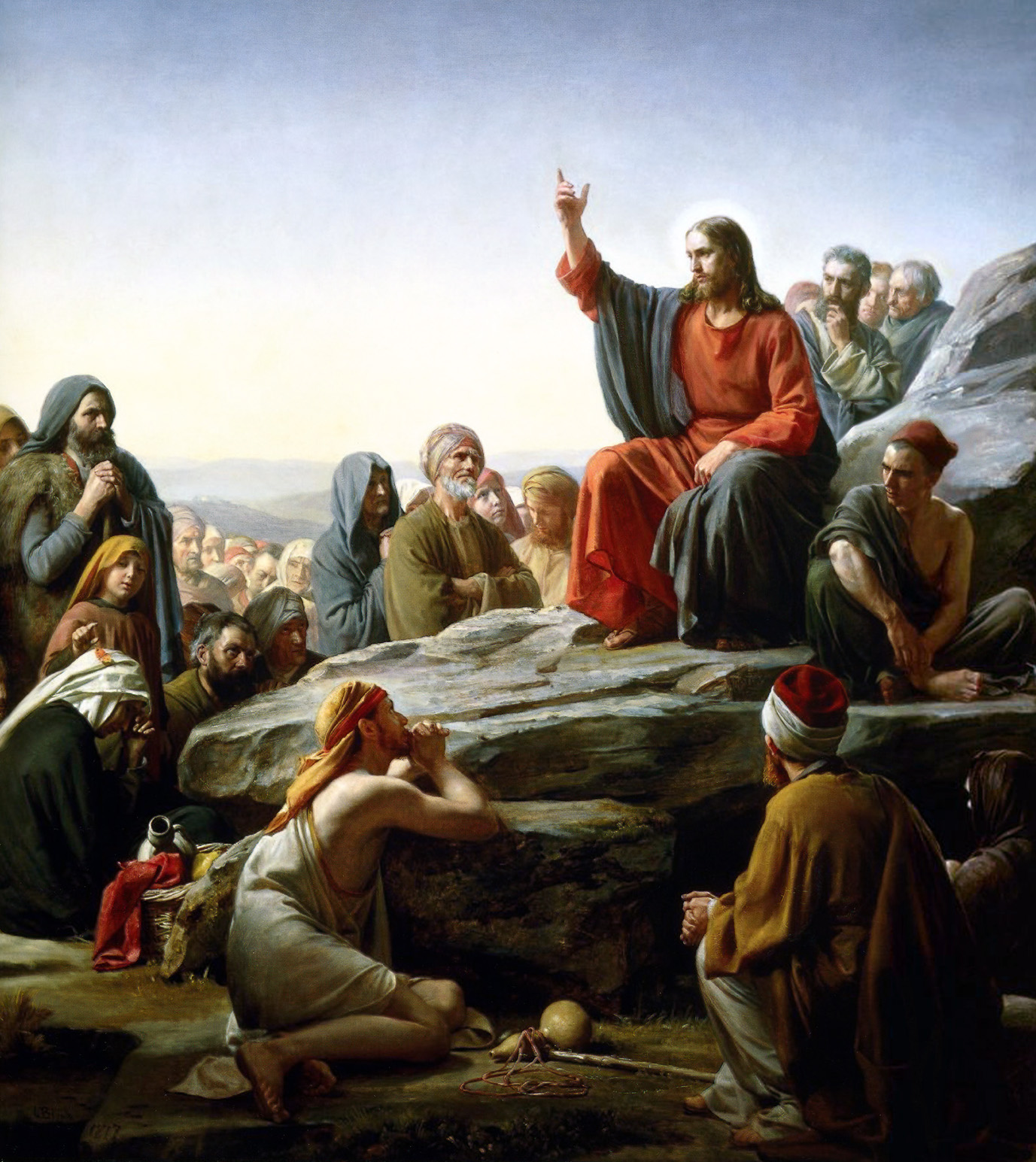
Sermon on the Mount, an 1877 painting by Carl Bloch

In Matthew 5, in a section of the Sermon on the Mount known as the Antitheses, Jesus references the commandment:

^{38}You have heard that it was said, ‘An eye for an eye and a tooth for a tooth.’ ^{39}But I tell you not to resist an evil person. But whoever slaps you on your right cheek, turn the other to him also. ^{40}If anyone wants to sue you and take away your tunic, let him have your cloak also. ^{42}Give to him who asks you, and from him who wants to borrow from you do not turn away.

— Jesus Christ, New King James Version (Matthew 5:38–42)

The commandment not to take revenge against evildoers is repeated by Jesus in the Sermon on the Plain (Luke 6:27–31) and by Paul the Apostle in several of his epistles (e.g. Romans 12:17–21), albeit without the reference to "an eye for an eye".

Since Jesus stated in the same sermon that he has come not to abolish the Law but to fulfil it, there is some controversy over whether Jesus abrogated the "eye for an eye" commandment. The other antitheses generally target the roots of sin, thereby intensifying the original Old Testament law instead of abrogating it. For example, Jesus extends the commandment "Thou shalt not murder" to also forbid hatred and anger, and "Thou shalt not commit adultery" to also forbid lust. Many Christian and Jewish commentators understand the lex talionis to have originally been intended to prevent disproportionate vengeance and blood feuds. Thus, Jesus is seen as extending the spirit of this commandment too: while the law's original intent was to limit vengeance, Jesus forbids it altogether, commanding non-retaliation and love for one's enemies instead of relying on even proportionate legal justice.

=== An eye for an eye makes the whole world blind ===
The phrase "an eye for an eye makes the (whole) world blind" and other similar phrases has been conveyed by, but not limited to George Perry Graham (1914) on capital punishment debate argument, Louis Fischer (1951) describing the philosophy of Mahatma Gandhi, and Martin Luther King Jr. (1958) in the context of racial violence.

== See also ==
- Live by the sword, die by the sword
- Compensatory damages – the modern interpretation of lex talionis in Anglo-American law
- Punitive damages (tort law) – the converse of lex talionis
- Golden Rule
- Nakam
- Retorsion

== General and cited references ==
- Hammurabi, Code of 1780 BC.
- Plaut (1981), The Torah: A Modern Commentary, New York: Union of American Hebrew Congregations.
