= Matthew 5:27–28 =

- ← 5:26 5:29 →
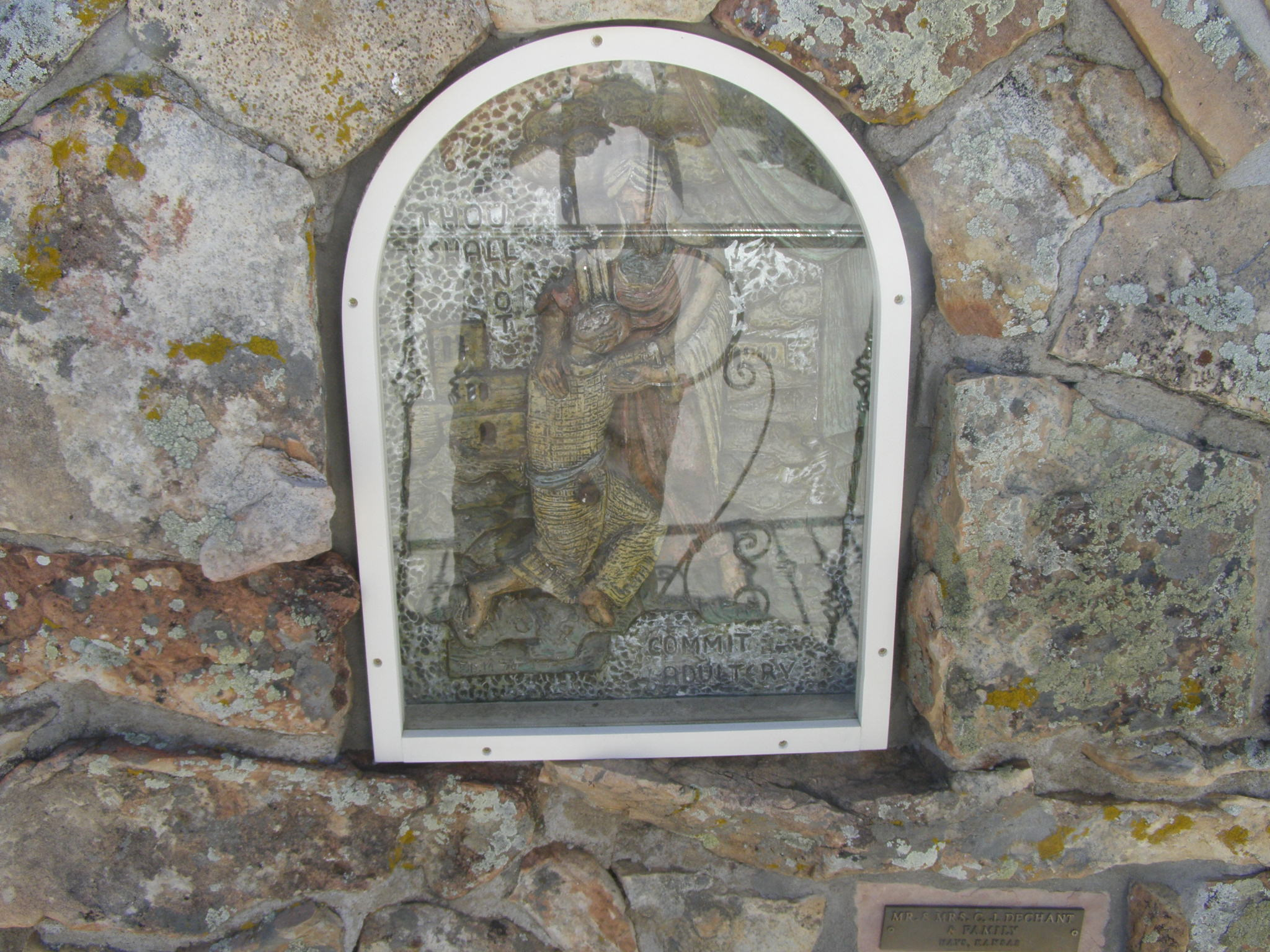
- Wall decoration with the text "Thou shall not commit adultery". Golden, Colorado
- Book: Gospel of Matthew
- Christian Bible part: New Testament

Matthew 5:27 and Matthew 5:28 are the twenty-seventh and twenty-eighth verses of the fifth chapter of the Gospel of Matthew in the New Testament and is part of the Sermon on the Mount. These verses begin the second antithesis: while since Matthew 5:21 the discussion has been on the commandment: "You shall not murder", it now moves to the commandment: "You shall not commit adultery".

== Content ==
In the King James Version of the Bible the text reads:

27 was said by them of
old time, Thou shalt not commit adultery:
28 But I say unto you, That whosoever looketh
on a woman to lust after her hath committed
adultery with her already in his heart.

The World English Bible translates the passage as:

27 "You have heard that it was said,
'You shall not commit adultery;'
28 but I tell you that everyone who gazes at a
woman to lust after her has committed
adultery with her already in his heart.

The Novum Testamentum Graece text is:

27 Ἠκούσατε ὅτι ἐρρέθη
Οὐ μοιχεύσεις.
28 ἐγὼ δὲ λέγω ὑμῖν ὅτι
πᾶς ὁ βλέπων γυναῖκα πρὸς τὸ ἐπιθυμῆσαι αὐτὴν
ἤδη ἐμοίχευσεν αὐτὴν ἐν τῇ καρδίᾳ αὐτοῦ.

== Analysis ==
Matthew 5:27 opens in a very similar manner to Matthew 5:21, but it omits "to the ancient ones", though Gundry believes that this is implied. "To the ancient ones" is found in the Textus Receptus version of this verse, and from there it was included in the KJV.

This verse refers to the commandment against adultery stated in Exodus 20:14. This verse follows immediately after the prohibition against murder, and the Sermon follows this same pattern.

The equation of lust with adultery is very similar to the earlier equation of anger and murder in Matthew 5:22. Like the previous verse this is often interpreted as Jesus expanding on the requirements of Mosaic Law, but not rejecting it. This sentiment was not original to Jesus, being discussed in the Old Testament and in contemporary Jewish literature. Kittle notes that similar ideas are expressed in T. Issachar and Tractate Kalla.

Just as the English word lust was originally a general term for desire, the Greek word ἐπιθυμέω was also a general term for desire. The LSJ lexicon suggests "set one's heart upon a thing, long for, covet, desire" as glosses for ἐπιθυμέω, which is used in verses that clearly have nothing to do with sexual desire. In the Septuagint, ἐπιθυμέω is the word used in the commandment to not covet:

You shall not covet (ἐπιθυμέω) your neighbor's wife; you shall not covet your neighbor's house or his field or his male slave or his female slave or his ox or his draft animal or any animal of his or whatever belongs to your neighbor. (Exodus 20:17, New English Translation of the Septuagint)

οὐκ ἐπιθυμήσεις τὴν γυναῖκα τοῦ πλησίον σου οὐκ ἐπιθυμήσεις τὴν οἰκίαν τοῦ πλησίον σου οὔτε τὸν ἀγρὸν αὐτοῦ οὔτε τὸν παῖδα αὐτοῦ οὔτε τὴν παιδίσκην αὐτοῦ οὔτε τοῦ βοὸς αὐτοῦ οὔτε τοῦ ὑποζυγίου αὐτοῦ οὔτε παντὸς κτήνους αὐτοῦ οὔτε ὅσα τῷ πλησίον σού ἐστιν. (Septuagint)

Matthew 5:27–28 may be a reference to Exodus 20:17, as a reminder that sin does not begin with adultery, but already when a man covets his neighbor's wife.

While coveting your neighbor's wife may involve sexual desire, it is unlikely that coveting a neighbor's house or field is sexual in nature. And in most New Testament uses, the word ἐπιθυμέω does not have a clear sexual connotation. For example:

1. For truly, I say to you, many prophets and righteous people longed to see what you see, and did not see it, and to hear what you hear, and did not hear it. (Matthew 13:17, ESV)
2. And he said to them, I have earnestly desired to eat this Passover with you before I suffer. (Luke 22:15, ESV)
3. I coveted no one's silver or gold or apparel. (Acts 20:33, ESV)
4. And he was longing to be fed with the pods that the pigs ate, and no one gave him anything. (Luke 15:16, ESV)

All of these verses involve strong desire or longing, but not sexual desire.

The word translated as 'woman' is γυνή (gynḗ), which can mean either 'woman' or 'wife'. Some scholars believe that Jesus is only talking about lusting after another's wife, not the attraction of a man to a woman in general. Nolland notes that sexual desire is not condemned in Matthew or in the contemporary literature, only misdirected desire.

According to the laws of the time, it was not adultery for a married man to sleep with an unmarried woman. Adultery was interpreted as a form of theft, and the harm came from stealing another man's wife. In Matthew 5:32, some feel Jesus will challenge this view. France states that lust is more precisely understood as "in order to do the forbidden with her." Schweizer notes that looking lustfully at a woman is specifically condemned, implying that it is possible for a man to look at a woman without lust. Important in that it rejects the need for absolute segregation of the sexes.

The evangelical Anglican Melvin Tinker states that:

The principle is clear isn't it, "You shall not commit adultery." How does the Pharisee handle it according to the minimum requirement method? He says, "Sex outside marriage is OK for us because neither of us are really married. I am not sleeping with another man's wife, so it isn't adultery, she's my girlfriend". Or it is also not adultery because "I have not had sex with that woman." to quote President Clinton's plea in the Monica Lewinski saga. So he can abuse his position as President by messing around with a girl who is hardly younger than his daughter, he can engage in all kinds of sexual activities with her, but because he technically doesn't have intercourse he can hold up his hands and say, "I have not had sex with that woman." That is a Pharisee speaking.

But the maximum application method says, adultery doesn't just happen when you have sexual intercourse, it happens in your heart. However, the mistranslation is unfortunate at this point. In the Greek it says, "If anyone looks upon a woman in order to lust, has already committed adultery with her in his heart." That is an important distinction. I need to point that out because sexual arousal, sexual interest, sexual attraction are essential for the continuation of the human species [...] It is about looking in order to lust. The striptease show, the dirty movie or video, the internet pornography. That is becoming a real problem. Over 80% of internet users are men and 50% of them use it to seek pornography [...] And if this is a difficulty for you, then do talk to someone about it in confidence. You see, it is the intending to look in order to have that arousal that Jesus has in his sights.

== Commentary from the Church Fathers ==
Augustine: He then goes on to correct the error of the Pharisees, declaring, Whoso looketh upon a woman to lust after her, hath committed adultery already with her in his heart. For the commandment of the Law, Thou shall not lust after thy neighbour's wife, (Exod. 20:17.) the Jews understood of taking her away, not of committing adultery with her.

Jerome: Between πάθος (páthos) and προπάθεια (propátheia), that is between actual passion and the first spontaneous movement of the mind, there is this difference: passion is at once a sin; the spontaneous movement of the mind, though it partakes of the evil of sin, is yet not held for an offence committed. When then one looks upon a woman, and his mind is therewith smitten, there is propassion; if he yields to this he passes from propassion to passion, and then it is no longer the will but the opportunity to sin that is wanting. Whosoever, then, looketh on a woman to lust after her, that is, so looks on her as to lust, and cast about to obtain, he is rightly said to commit adultery with her in his heart.

Augustine: For there are three things which make up a sin; suggestion either through the memory, or the present sense; if the thought of the pleasure of indulgence follows, that is an unlawful thought, and to be restrained; if you consent then, the sin is complete. For prior to the first consent, the pleasure is either none or very slight, the consenting to which makes the sin. But if consent proceeds on into overt act, then desire seems to be satiated and quenched. And when suggestion is again repeated, the contemplated pleasure is greater, which previous to habit formed was but small, but now more difficult to overcome.

Gregory the Great: But whoso casts his eyes about without caution will often be taken with the pleasure of sin, and ensnared by desires begins to wish for what he would not. Great is the strength of the flesh to draw us downwards, and the charm of beauty once admitted to the heart through the eye, is hardly banished by endeavour. We must therefore take heed at the first, we ought not to look upon what it is unlawful to desire. For that the heart may be kept pure in thought, the eyes, as being on the watch to hurry us to sin, should be averted from wanton looks.

Chrysostom: If you permit yourself to gaze often on fair countenances you will assuredly be taken, even though you may be able to command your mind twice or thrice. For you are not exalted above nature and the strength of humanity. She too who dresses and adorns herself for the purpose of attracting men's eyes to her, though her endeavour should fail, yet shall she be punished hereafter; seeing she mixed the poison and offered the cup, though none was found who would drink thereof. For what the Lord seems to speak only to the man, is of equal application to the woman; inasmuch as when He speaks to the head, the warning is meant for the whole body.

Chrysostom: The Lord having explained how much is contained in the first commandment, namely, Thou shalt not kill, proceeds in regular order to the second.

Augustine: Thou shalt not commit adultery, that is, Thou shalt go no where but to thy lawful wife. For if you exact this of your wife, you ought to do the same, for the husband ought to go before the wife in virtue. It is a shame for the husband to say that this is impossible. Why not the husband as well as the wife? And let not him that is unmarried suppose that he does not break this commandment by fornication; you know the price wherewith you have been bought, you know what you eat and what you drink, therefore keep yourself from fornications. Forasmuch as all such acts of lust pollute and destroy God's image, (which you are,) the Lord who knows what is good for you, gives you this precept that you may not pull down His temple which you have begun to be.

Preceded by Matthew 5:26	Gospel of Matthew; Chapter 5	Succeeded by Matthew 5:29
