= Matthew 5 =

- ← chapter 4 chapter 6 →
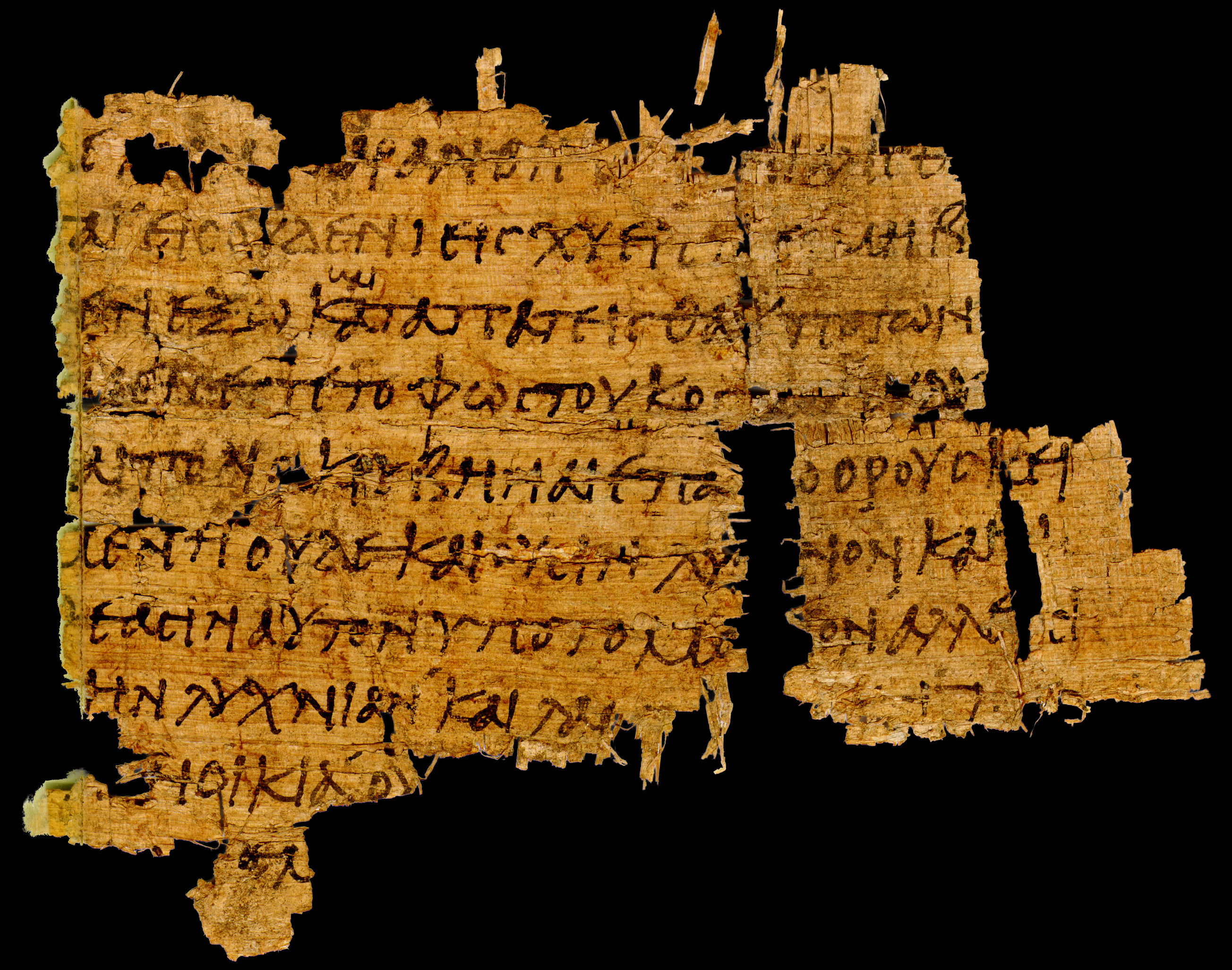
- Matthew 5:13–16 on Papyrus 86 (4th century)
- Book: Gospel of Matthew
- Category: Gospel
- Christian Bible part: New Testament
- Order in the Christian part: 1

Matthew 5 is the fifth chapter of the Gospel of Matthew in the New Testament. It contains the first portion of the Sermon on the Mount, the other portions of which are contained in chapters 6 and 7. Portions are similar to the Sermon on the Plain in Luke 6, but much of the material is found only in Matthew. It is one of the most discussed and analyzed chapters of the New Testament.

== Text ==
The original text was written in Koine Greek. This chapter is divided into 48 verses.

=== Textual witnesses ===
Some early manuscripts containing text from this chapter are:

- Papyrus 64 (Magdalen papyrus) (c. AD 200; extant verses 20–22, 25–28)
- Papyrus 86 (4th century; extant verses 13–16, 22–25)
- Codex Vaticanus (4th century)
- Codex Sinaiticus (4th century)
- Codex Washingtonianus (4–5th century)
- Codex Bezae (5th century)
- Codex Alexandrinus (5th century)
- Codex Ephraemi Rescriptus (5th century; extant verses 1–14)

== Structure ==
The structure of Matthew 5 can be broken down as follows:

- Matthew 5:1–12 – Setting and Beatitudes
- Matthew 5:13–16 – Salt of the earth and light of the world
- Matthew 5:17–20 – Law and the Prophets
- Matthew 5:21–26 – Do not hate
- Matthew 5:27–30 – Do not lust
- Matthew 5:31–32 – Do not divorce except for sexual misconduct
- Matthew 5:33–37 – Do not swear oaths
- Matthew 5:38–42 – Do not retaliate
- Matthew 5:43–48 – Love your enemies

== Old Testament references ==
Matthew 5:35 references Psalm 48:2.

== Analysis ==
In the Middle Ages an interpretation was developed that the chapter only applied to a select group, and not to the general populace. Reformer Martin Luther, in a discussion of this chapter, was highly critical of the Catholic view. He wrote that "there have fallen upon this [fifth] chapter the vulgar hogs and asses, jurists and sophists, the right hand of the pope and his Mamelukes."

In John Wesley's analysis of the Sermon on the Mount, chapter five outlines "the sum of all true religion", allowing chapter 6 to detail "rules for that right intention which we are to preserve in all our outward actions, unmixed with worldly desires or anxious cares for even the necessaries of life" and chapter 7 to provide "cautions against the main hinderances of religion".

Matthew 5 contains parallels to the other Synoptic Gospels. These include a few parallels to Mark (e.g., Mark 4, 5, 9) and many to Luke, especially to the Sermon on the Plain (Luke 6), as well as to other materials (e.g., Luke 8, 12, 14, 16). According to the four-source hypothesis, most of Matthew 5 is based on Q and Matthew's unique source or sources (M). Harvey King McArthur considers the parallels in Luke to be very loose, much further away than most areas they overlap. McArthur thus theorizes that there must have been an extra step between the sources Matthew and Luke used.

== Beatitudes ==
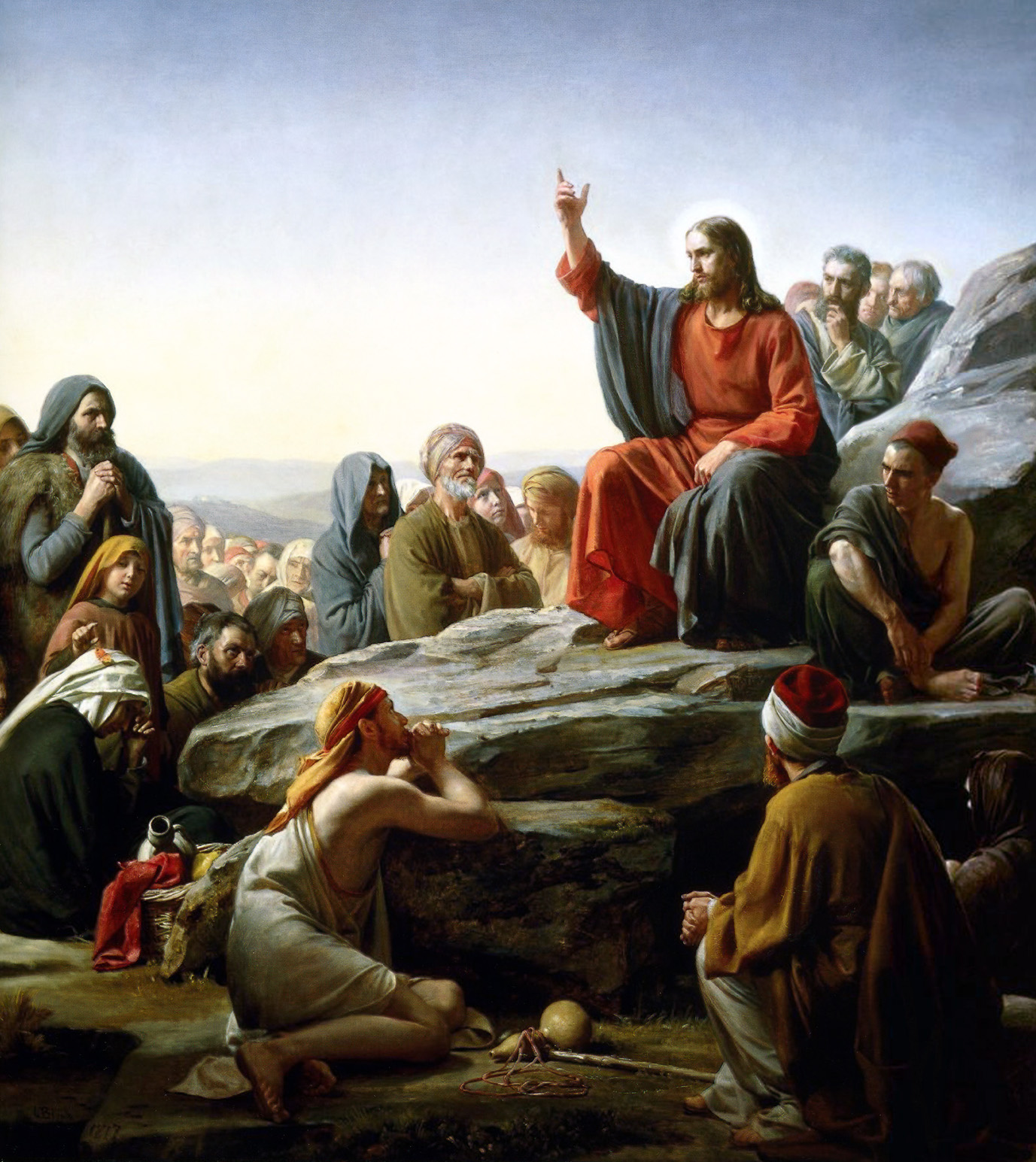
The Sermon on the Mount, by Carl Heinrich Bloch, 1877

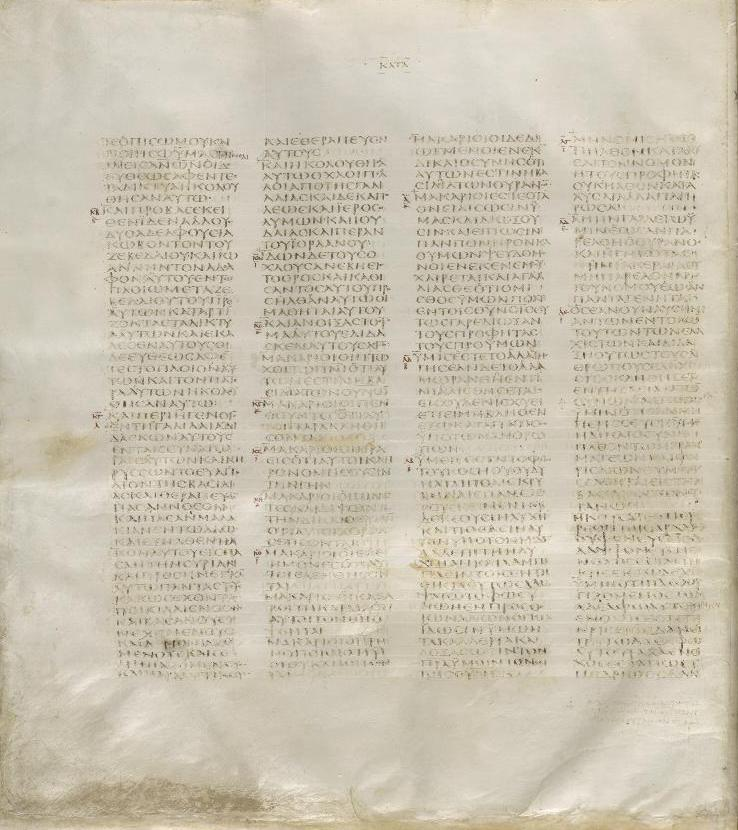
Codex Sinaiticus (AD 330–360), Matthew 4:19–5:22

After a brief introduction (Matthew 5:1–2), the chapter contains the section known as the Beatitudes, which includes some of Jesus' most famous teachings. Robert H. Gundry suggests that the Beatitudes can be divided into two quartets. The first group of four beatitudes describes the ideal righteous behaviour of Jesus' disciples. The second group of four focuses on the persecution that these disciples will likely encounter because of their righteous behaviour.

Some scholars feel the ninth Beatitude in Matthew 5:11 is separate from the first eight, as demonstrated by its shift to the second person. However, the use of the second person here may simply be a reflection of the four beatitudes found in Luke 6:20–23 that are all in the second person. In contrast to Matthew's beatitudes with their characteristic spiritual expressions (e.g., "poor in spirit", "hunger and thirst for righteousness", and "persecuted for righteousness sake") and the multiple references to his own term, the "kingdom of heaven", Luke reflects social and economic realities with simple mentions of "you who are poor", "you who are hungry now", and "when people hate you". This understanding is clearly evident in Luke's four parallel "woes", which were inserted after the beatitudes in verses 24–26. Furthermore, Luke uses the common expression "kingdom of God", the only term for the kingdom used in Mark and Luke.

The English word used to show the positive nature of the Beatitudes is blessed. A number of scholars note that this is not an ideal translation as in modern English, blessed often means "blessed by God", a meaning not implied by the Greek. William F. Albright and C. S. Mann use the more general word fortunate instead of blessed. R. T. France feels that it should be read as "worthy of congratulation". Lapide supports the New American Bible usage of happy; it directly translates the word beatus in the Vulgate, and it carries the meaning of the Greek. After the Beatitudes there are a series of metaphors, called Salt and Light, that are often seen as commentaries upon them. These include a number of famous phrases such as salt of the earth and city on a hill.

== Teachings on the law ==
=== The role and importance of the law ===
- Verse 17 – Jesus states that he has not come to "abolish (Note: kataluo (Strong's #2647)) the law" but to "fulfill" (Note: pleroo (Strong's #4137)) it.
- Verse 18 – Jesus then declares the law to be valid until "Heaven and Earth pass away" and "all things are accomplished". (Note: ginomai (Strong's #1096))
- Verse 19 – shows a direct correlation between the act of adhering to the Biblical Code, and the righteousness of the individual.
- Verse 20 – Jesus identifies greater righteousness (Note: dikaiosune (Strong's #1343)) as a condition for inclusion in the Kingdom of Heaven.

The NIV translation entitles Matthew 5:17–20 as "The Fulfillment of the Law". The NRSV translation entitles it "The Law and the Prophets", and the United Bible Societies' "The Greek New Testament", edited by Kurt Aland, Bruce Metzger and others, entitles it the "Teaching about the Law".

This pericope is at the core of the argument about the relationship between the views attributed to Jesus, such as Gospel, Grace, New Covenant, New Commandment, Law of Christ, and those attributed to Moses or the Mosaic Law, and hence on the relationship between the New Testament and Old Testament, Christian views on the old covenant, Law and Gospel, and as a basis of Christian ethics.

The reason for this argument is a disagreement about the proper interpretation of the word fulfill (Ancient Greek: πληρόω). As David Wilber explains, "Depending upon the context, the verb 'to fulfill' (πληρόω) can mean to carry out, to show forth true meaning, or to complete." Wilber goes on to argue that "the sense of 'fully doing' or 'revealing true meaning' fits this context better than the idea of 'completing.'" Other interpreters, like Andy Stanley, suggest that Matthew intends the meaning of "bring to an end." As Stanley writes, "Jesus fulfilled—as in ended—the necessity of the Jewish law." Many modern scholars now consider these four verses to be a prelude to the Antitheses, but this position is not universally accepted, and many continue to interpret Matthew 5:17–20 independent of its textual neighbors.

=== Antitheses ===
The sermon then moves to a highly structured discussion ("Ye have heard... But I say unto you") of the "Law and Prophets" or Old Covenant. This section (Matthew 5:17 to Matthew 5:48) is traditionally referred to as the Antitheses, or the Six Antitheses.

Gundry disputes this title: "The sayings are traditionally called 'the Antitheses'. However this designation seems to imply that after stoutly affirming the Law in Matthew 5:17–20, Jesus contradicts it." Instead Gundry argues that Jesus escalates the Law towards "the goal toward which it was already headed, so that we should stop calling these sayings "the Antitheses" and perhaps start calling them "the Culminations.""

After the introduction (5:17–20), the next verses are commentaries on six specific topics where Jesus recites a law, starting with two of the Ten Commandments, and then comments on it. This generally sees Jesus impose more rigorous standards. The six antitheses are on:

1. You shall not murder in verses 21, 22, 23, 24, 25, 26
2. You shall not commit adultery in verses 27, 28, 29, 30
3. Divorce in verses 31 and 32
4. Oaths in verses 33, 34, 35, 36, 37
5. Eye for an eye in verses 38, 39, 40, 41, 42
6. Love thy neighbour as thyself in verses 43, 44, 45, 46, 47, 48

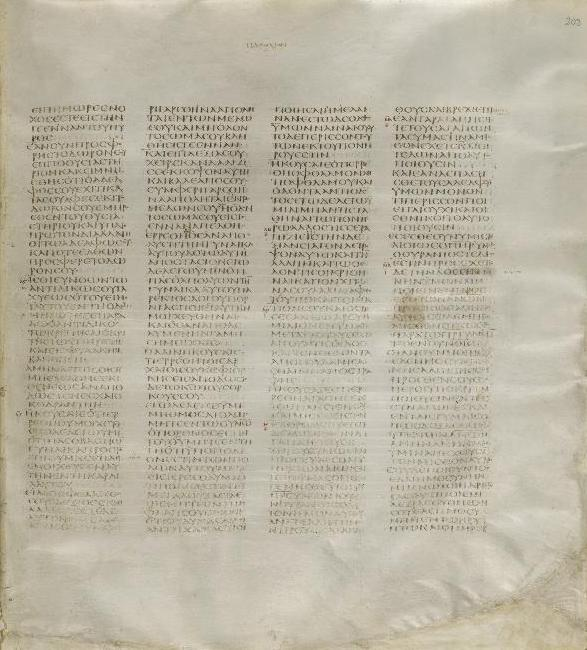
Codex Sinaiticus (AD 330–60), Matthew 5:22–6:4

The Jewish Encyclopedia states:

As Schechter in J.Q.R. x. 11, shows, the expression "Ye have heard..." is an inexact translation of the rabbinical formula (שומע אני), which is only a formal logical interrogation introducing the opposite view as the only correct one: "Ye might deduce from this verse that thou shalt love thy neighbor and hate thine enemy, but I say to you the only correct interpretation is, Love all men, even thine enemies."

Jesus' six antitheses are on six topics. In each of them, Jesus opens the statement with words to the effect: "You have heard it said... but I say to you...". These antitheses appear only in Matthew. At the outset, Jesus made it clear that he greatly respects Old Testament Law in the Torah, and fulfilling the Law was one of his purposes for coming to Earth.

Daniel J. Harrington believes that the author of Matthew wrote primarily, but not exclusively, for Jewish Christians. If so, that may explain why Matthew could use Jewish rhetoric and themes without explanation. Harrington says that is not the case for 21st-century Americans and others who read the Gospel today. In the six antitheses Jesus either extends through the Commandment's scope by going to the root of the abuse (avoiding anger and lust to prevent murder and adultery) or going beyond a biblical commandment as in the case of divorce and oaths. Harrington writes that Matthew presents the six antitheses as examples of the principle that Jesus came not to abolish but to fulfill the Law and the Prophets.

=== Murder ===
The first antithesis (verses 21–22) attacks anger as the root of murder. The two loosely connected illustrations (23–24, 25–26) point out the value of reconciling with one's enemy.

You have heard that it was said to the people long ago, "Do not murder, and anyone who murders will be subject to judgment." But I tell you that anyone who is angry with his brother (Note: Some manuscripts say "brother or sister without cause"─NIV notes.) will be subject to judgment. Again, anyone who says to his brother, "Raca", (Note: Raca is an Aramaic term of contempt.─NIV notes) is answerable to the Sanhedrin. But anyone who says, "You fool!" will be in danger of the fire of hell.

— Matthew 5:21–22

=== Adultery ===
The second antithesis (verses 27–28) attacks lust as the root of adultery. The sayings about the right eye and the right-hand as causes of scandal (29–30) are further instances of going to the sources of sin.

You have heard that it was said, "Do not commit adultery." But I tell you that anyone who looks at a woman lustfully has already committed adultery with her in his heart. If your right eye causes you to sin, gouge it out and throw it away. It is better for you to lose one part of your body than for your whole body to be thrown into hell. And if your right hand causes you to sin, cut it off and throw it away. It is better for you to lose one part of your body than for your whole body to go into hell.

— Matthew 5:27–30

=== Divorce ===
The third antithesis (verses 31–32) not only contains Jesus' rejection of the legal process of divorce stated in Deuteronomy 24:1, but uniquely includes his only justification for divorce, i.e. "sexual unfaithfulness" (cf. Matthew 19:8). (Note: In both texts, the unique exception centers on the word πορνεία, an expression used for "various kinds of 'unsanctioned sexual intercourse'".)

It has been said, "Anyone who divorces his wife must give her a certificate of divorce." But I tell you that anyone who divorces his wife, except for marital unfaithfulness, causes her to become an adulteress, and anyone who marries the divorced woman commits adultery.

— Matthew 5:31–32

=== Oaths ===
The fourth antithesis (verses 33–37) about oaths says to avoid oaths entirely so as never to swear falsely.

Again, you have heard that it was said to the people long ago, "Do not break your oath, but keep the oaths you have made to the Lord." But I tell you, Do not swear at all: either by heaven, for it is God's throne; or by the earth, for it is his footstool; or by Jerusalem, for it is the city of the Great King. And do not swear by your head, for you cannot make even one hair white or black. Simply let your "Yes" be "Yes", and your "No", "No"; anything beyond this comes from the evil one.

— Matthew 5:33–37

=== An eye for an eye ===
The fifth antithesis on non-retaliation (verses 38–39a) also urges the followers of Jesus to not seek revenge through violence. The examples not only prohibit violence, but also require that brutality and force be met with goodness.

You have heard that it was said, "Eye for eye, and tooth for tooth." But I tell you, do not resist an evil person. If someone strikes you on the right cheek, turn to him the other also. And if someone wants to sue you and take your tunic, let him have your cloak as well. If someone forces you to go one mile, go with him two miles. Give to the one who asks you, and do not turn away from the one who wants to borrow from you.

— Matthew 5:38–42

=== Love for enemies ===
The final antithesis (verses 43–48) expands the concept of "neighbor". Here Jesus urges that love should include even enemies instead of restricting love only to those who either can benefit or who already love someone. This section concludes with the call to be perfect, "as your heavenly Father is perfect", who "causes his sun to rise on the evil and the good, and sends rain on the righteous and the unrighteous".

You have heard that it was said, "Love your neighbor and hate your enemy." But I tell you: Love your enemies and pray for those who persecute you, that you may be sons of your Father in heaven. He causes his sun to rise on the evil and the good, and sends rain on the righteous and the unrighteous. If you love those who love you, what reward will you get? Are not even the tax collectors doing that? And if you greet only your brothers, what are you doing more than others? Do not even pagans do that? Be perfect, therefore, as your heavenly Father is perfect.

— Matthew 5:43–47

== Verses ==
- Matthew 5:1
- Matthew 5:2
- Matthew 5:3
- Matthew 5:4
- Matthew 5:5
- Matthew 5:6
- Matthew 5:7
- Matthew 5:8
- Matthew 5:9
- Matthew 5:10
- Matthew 5:11
- Matthew 5:12
- Matthew 5:13
- Matthew 5:14
- Matthew 5:15
- Matthew 5:16
- Matthew 5:17
- Matthew 5:18
- Matthew 5:19
- Matthew 5:20
- Matthew 5:21
- Matthew 5:22
- Matthew 5:23
- Matthew 5:24
- Matthew 5:25
- Matthew 5:26
- Matthew 5:27
- Matthew 5:28
- Matthew 5:29
- Matthew 5:30
- Matthew 5:31
- Matthew 5:32
- Matthew 5:33
- Matthew 5:34
- Matthew 5:35
- Matthew 5:36
- Matthew 5:37
- Matthew 5:38
- Matthew 5:39
- Matthew 5:40
- Matthew 5:41
- Matthew 5:42
- Matthew 5:43
- Matthew 5:44
- Matthew 5:45
- Matthew 5:46
- Matthew 5:47
- Matthew 5:48

== See also ==
- Turning the other cheek

== Sources ==
- Albright, W.F. and C.S. Mann. "Matthew". The Anchor Bible Series. New York: Doubleday & Co., 1971.
- Betz, Hans Dieter. Essays on the Sermon on the Mount. Translations by Laurence Welborn. Philadelphia: Fortress Press, 1985.
- Clarke, Howard W. The Gospel of Matthew and its Readers: A Historical Introduction to the First Gospel. Bloomington: Indiana University Press, 2003.
- France, R.T. The Gospel According to Matthew: an Introduction and Commentary. Leicester: Inter-Varsity, 1985.
- Gundry, Robert H. Matthew a Commentary on his Literary and Theological Art. Grand Rapids: William B. Eerdmans, 1982.
- Hill, David. The Gospel of Matthew. Grand Rapids: Eerdmans, 1981.
- Kissinger, Warren S. The Sermon on the Mount: A History of Interpretation and Bibliography. Metuchen: Scarecrow Press, 1975.
- Kodjak, Andrej (1986). A Structural Analysis of the Sermon on the Mount. New York: de Gruyter. ISBN 978-3110108330.
- Lapide, Pinchas. The Sermon on the Mount, Utopia or Program for Action?, translated from the German by Arlene Swidler. Maryknoll: Orbis Books, 1986.
- McArthur, Harvey King. Understanding the Sermon on the Mount. Westport: Greenwood Press, 1978.
- Schweizer, Eduard. The Good News According to Matthew. Atlanta: John Knox Press, 1975.
