= Papyrus 86 =

Papyrus 𝔓^{86}
- New Testament manuscript
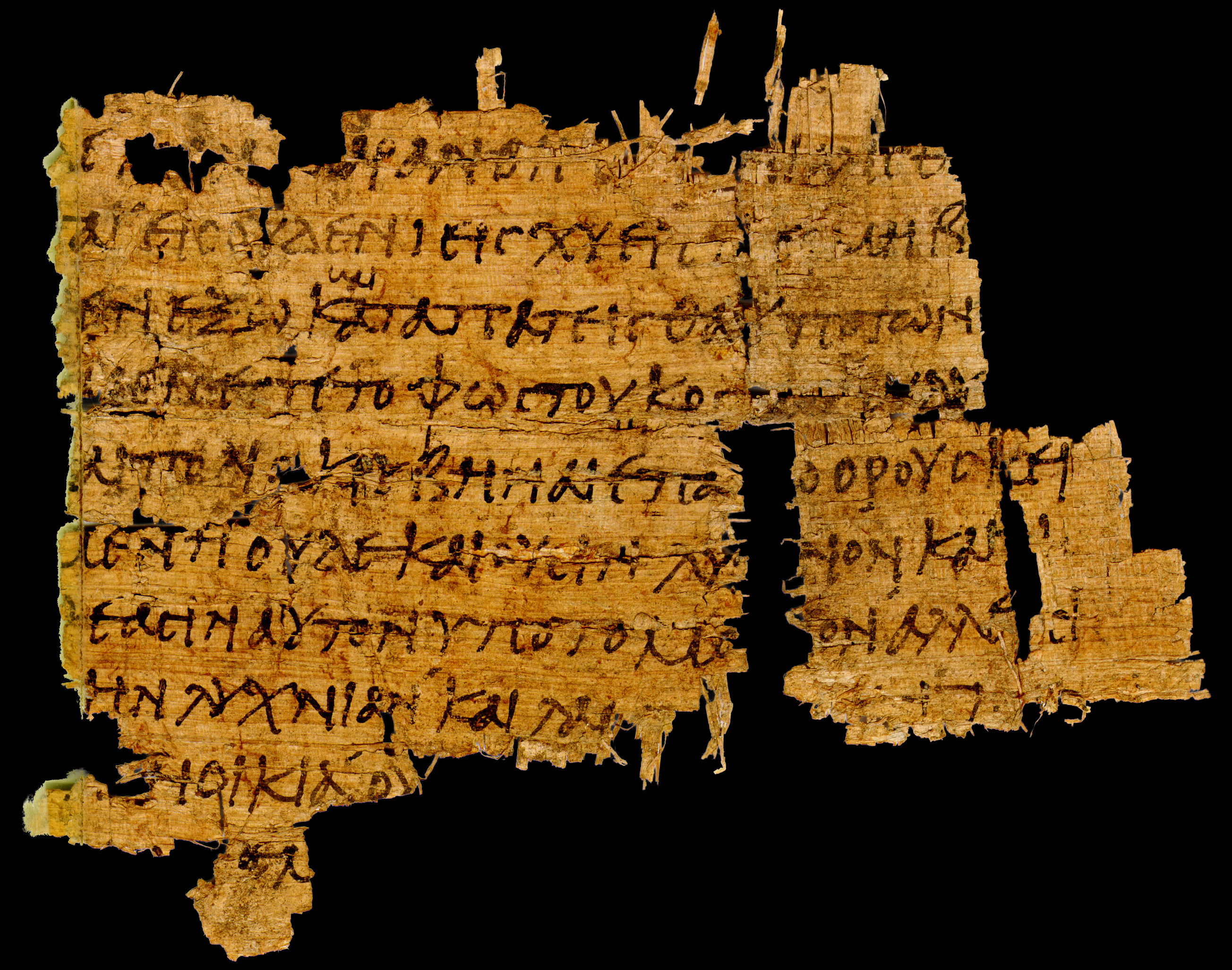
- Recto, Matt 5:13-16
- Name: Pap. Col. 5516
- Text: Gospel of Matthew 5 †
- Date: 4th century
- Script: Greek
- Found: Egypt
- Now at: University of Cologne
- Cite: Charalambakis-Hagedorn-Kaimakis-Thüngen, Vier literarische Papyri der Kölner Sammlung, ZPE 14 (Barcelona: 1974), pp. 37-40.
- Type: Alexandrian text-type
- Category: II

Papyrus 86 (in the Gregory-Aland numbering), designated by siglum 𝔓^{86}, is an early copy of the New Testament in Greek. It is a papyrus manuscript of the Gospel of Matthew. The manuscript palaeographically has been assigned to the 4th century.

The surviving texts of Matthew are verses 5:13-16, 22-25.

Text

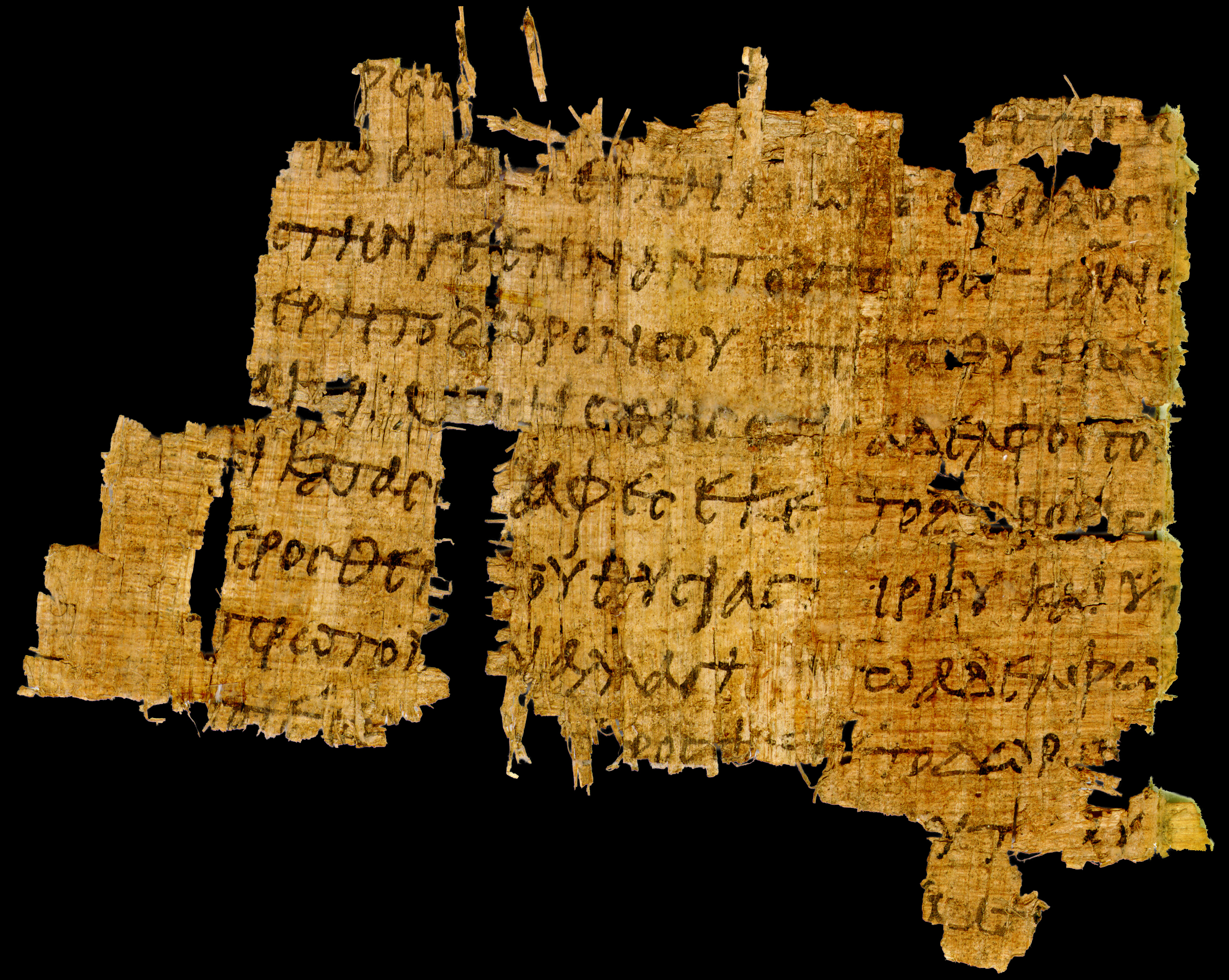
Verso, Matt 5:22-25

The Greek text of this codex is a representative of the Alexandrian text-type. Aland placed it in Category II, it means, it has some alien readings.

Content

Matthew 5:13-16:

Koine Greek, SBL Greek New Testament:

13 Ὑμεῖς ἐστε τὸ ἅλας τῆς γῆς· ἐὰν δὲ τὸ ἅλας μωρανθῇ, ἐν τίνι ἁλισθήσεται; εἰς οὐδὲν ἰσχύει ἔτι εἰ μὴ βληθὲν ἔξω καταπατεῖσθαι ὑπὸ τῶν ἀνθρώπων. 14 Ὑμεῖς ἐστε τὸ φῶς τοῦ κόσμου. οὐ δύναται πόλις κρυβῆναι ἐπάνω ὄρους κειμένη· 15 οὐδὲ καίουσιν λύχνον καὶ τιθέασιν αὐτὸν ὑπὸ τὸν μόδιον ἀλλ’ ἐπὶ τὴν λυχνίαν, καὶ λάμπει πᾶσιν τοῖς ἐν τῇ οἰκίᾳ. 16 οὕτως λαμψάτω τὸ φῶς ὑμῶν ἔμπροσθεν τῶν ἀνθρώπων, ὅπως ἴδωσιν ὑμῶν τὰ καλὰ ἔργα καὶ δοξάσωσιν τὸν πατέρα ὑμῶν τὸν ἐν τοῖς οὐρανοῖς.

English, New International Version:

13 “You are the salt of the earth. But if the salt loses its saltiness, how can it be made salty again? It is no longer good for anything, except to be thrown out and trampled underfoot. 14 “You are the light of the world. A town built on a hill cannot be hidden. 15 Neither do people light a lamp and put it under a bowl. Instead they put it on its stand, and it gives light to everyone in the house. 16 In the same way, let your light shine before others, that they may see your good deeds and glorify your Father in heaven.

Matthew 5:22-25: Koine Greek, SBL Greek New Testament:

22 ἐγὼ δὲ λέγω ὑμῖν ὅτι πᾶς ὁ ὀργιζόμενος τῷ ἀδελφῷ [a]αὐτοῦ ἔνοχος ἔσται τῇ κρίσει· ὃς δ’ ἂν εἴπῃ τῷ ἀδελφῷ αὐτοῦ· Ῥακά, ἔνοχος ἔσται τῷ συνεδρίῳ· ὃς δ’ ἂν εἴπῃ· Μωρέ, ἔνοχος ἔσται εἰς τὴν γέενναν τοῦ πυρός.

23 ἐὰν οὖν προσφέρῃς τὸ δῶρόν σου ἐπὶ τὸ θυσιαστήριον κἀκεῖ μνησθῇς ὅτι ὁ ἀδελφός σου ἔχει τι κατὰ σοῦ, 24 ἄφες ἐκεῖ τὸ δῶρόν σου ἔμπροσθεν τοῦ θυσιαστηρίου καὶ ὕπαγε πρῶτον διαλλάγηθι τῷ ἀδελφῷ σου, καὶ τότε ἐλθὼν πρόσφερε τὸ δῶρόν σου.

25 ἴσθι εὐνοῶν τῷ ἀντιδίκῳ σου ταχὺ ἕως ὅτου εἶ μετ’ αὐτοῦ ἐν τῇ ὁδῷ, μήποτέ σε παραδῷ ὁ ἀντίδικος τῷ κριτῇ, καὶ ὁ κριτὴς τῷ ὑπηρέτῃ, καὶ εἰς φυλακὴν.

English, New International Version:

22 But I tell you that anyone who is angry with a brother or sister will be subject to judgment. Again, anyone who says to a brother or sister, ‘Raca,’ is answerable to the court. And anyone who says, ‘You fool!’ will be in danger of the fire of hell.

23 “Therefore, if you are offering your gift at the altar and there remember that your brother or sister has something against you, 24 leave your gift there in front of the altar. First go and be reconciled to them; then come and offer your gift.

25 “Settle matters quickly with your adversary who is taking you to court. Do it while you are still together on the way, or your adversary may hand you over to the judge, and the judge may hand you over to the officer, and you may be thrown into prison.

Location

It is currently housed at the Institut für Altertumskunde in University of Cologne (P. Col. theol. 5516) in Cologne.

== See also ==
- List of New Testament papyri
- Matthew 5:13
- Matthew 5:14
- Matthew 5:15–16
- Matthew 5:22
- Matthew 5:23–24
- Matthew 5:25

== Images ==
- Leaf from 𝔓^{86} recto
- Leaf from 𝔓^{86} verso
