= Matthew 5:26 =

- ← 5:25 5:27 →
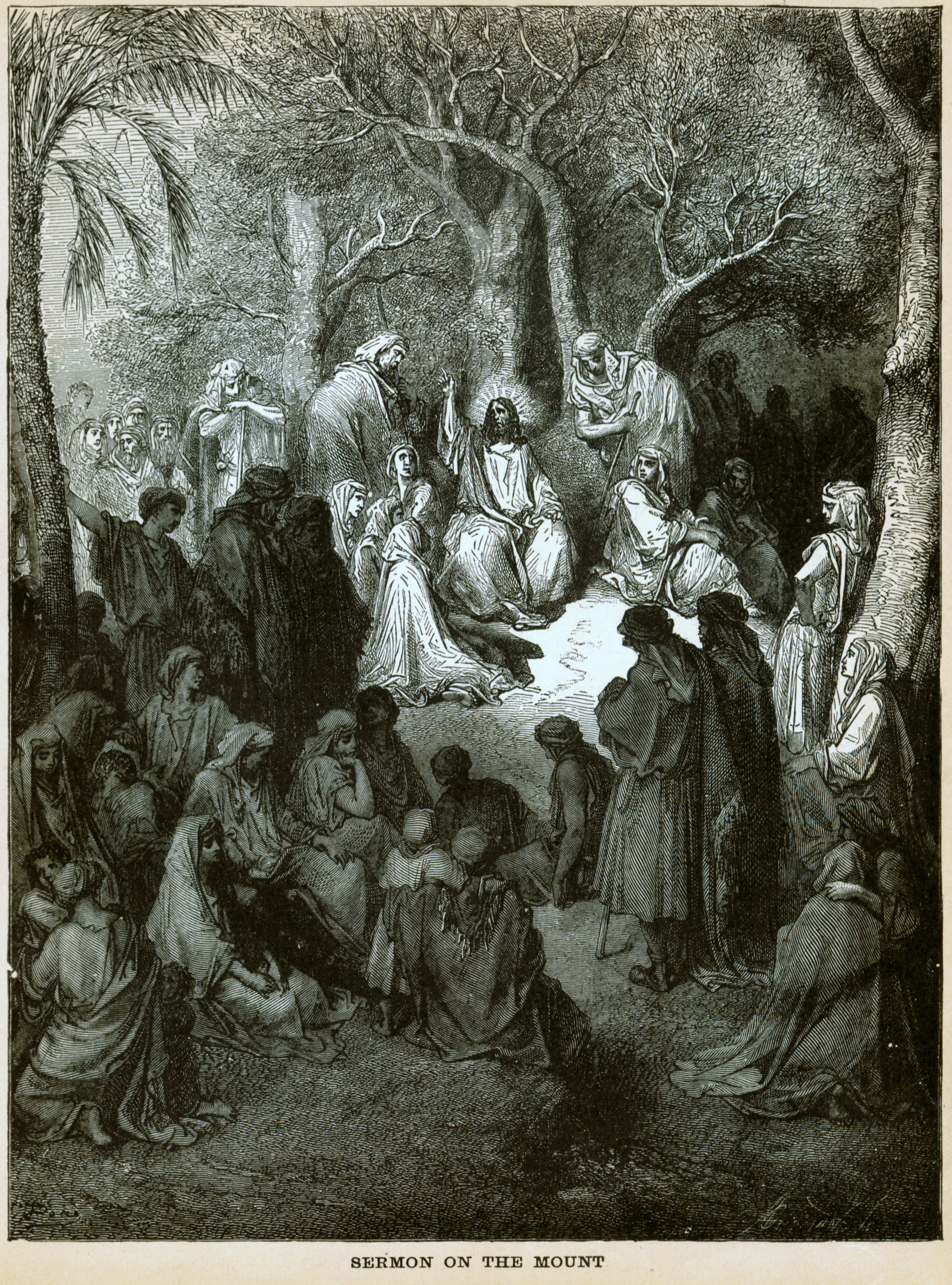
- "The Sermon on the Mount", a Bible illustration by Gustave Doré
- Book: Gospel of Matthew
- Christian Bible part: New Testament

Matthew 5:26 is the twenty-sixth verse of the fifth chapter of the Gospel of Matthew in the New Testament and is part of the Sermon on the Mount. Jesus has just warned that if you do not reconcile with your enemies a judge is likely to throw you in jail. In this verse Jesus mentions that your debts must be paid completely before one can leave.

== Content ==
In the King James Version of the Bible the text reads:

Verily I say unto thee, Thou shalt
by no means come out thence, till
thou hast paid the uttermost farthing.

The World English Bible translates the passage as:

Most certainly I tell you, you shall
by no means get out of there, until
you have paid the last penny.

The Novum Testamentum Graece text is:

ἀμὴν λέγω σοι,
οὐ μὴ ἐξέλθῃς ἐκεῖθεν
ἕως ἂν ἀποδῷς τὸν ἔσχατον κοδράντην.

For a collection of other versions see BibleHub Matthew 5:26

== Analysis ==
This verse opens with a similar phrase to that of Matthew 5:22, often translated as "amen I say to you." This is a popular phrase in Matthew, that Schweizer notes usually introduces something eschatological. This verse is normally taken as a metaphor for how God must be pleased. France notes that it is clear that for God has no half-measures, that even for a slight debt punishment will still be full.

Nolland notes that there is no tradition of imprisonment until a fine is paid in the Jewish legal tradition. The allusions in the verse are to the Greco-Roman system of justice, which did have such punishments, and was in place at the time in Roman occupied Judea. The coin mentioned is also Roman. The word translated as farthing in the KJV and penny in the WEB in Greek is a quadrans, as implied by the translations this was a coin of low value. In the Roman currency system of the time the Quadrans was the lowest valued coin. The very similar verse at Luke 12:59 mentions a mite, a Jewish coin worth even less than a quadrans.

This is one of a small group of verses that have been advanced as Biblical references to purgatory, and one that was attacked by the early Protestant reformers. Schweizer agrees and states that the waiting reference is simply a link to the analogy begun in the earlier verse. Schweizer also notes that this verse jars somewhat with the previous part of the parable as debt or fines have not been mentioned. To Schweizer this implies that Jesus is being metaphorical rather than discussing actual legal problems.

== Commentary from the Church Fathers ==
Jerome: A farthing is a coin containing two mites. What He says then is, ‘Thou shalt not go forth thence till thou hast paid for the smallest sins.’

Augustine: Or it is an expression to denote that there is nothing that shall go unpunished; as we say ‘To the dregs,’ when we are speaking of any thing so emptied that nothing is left in it. Or by the last farthing may be denoted earthly sins. For the fourth and last element of this world is earth. Paid, that is in eternal punishment; and until used in the same sense as in that, Sit thou on my right hand until I make thy enemies thy footstool; (Ps. 110:1.) for He does not cease to reign when His enemies are put under His feet. So here, until thou hast paid, is as much as to say, thou shalt never come out thence, for that he is always paying the very last farthing while he is enduring the everlasting punishment of earthly sins.

Pseudo-Chrysostom: Or, If you will make your peace yet in this world, you may receive pardon of even the heaviest offences; but if once damned and cast, into the prison of hell, punishment will be exacted of you not for grievous sins only, but for each idle word, which may be denoted by the very last farthing.

Hilary of Poitiers: For because charity covers a multitude of sins, we shall therefore pay the last farthing of punishment, unless by the expense of charity we redeem the fault of our sin.

Pseudo-Chrysostom: Or, the prison is worldly misfortune which God often sends upon sinners.

Chrysostom: Or, He here speaks of the judges of this world, of the way which leads to this judgment, and of human prisons; thus not only employing future but present inducements, as those things which are before the eyes affect us most, as St. Paul also declares, If you do evil fear the power, for he bears not the sword in vain. (Rom. 13:4.)

Preceded by Matthew 5:25	Gospel of Matthew; Chapter 5	Succeeded by Matthew 5:27
