= Matthew 5:20 =

- ← 5:19 5:21 →
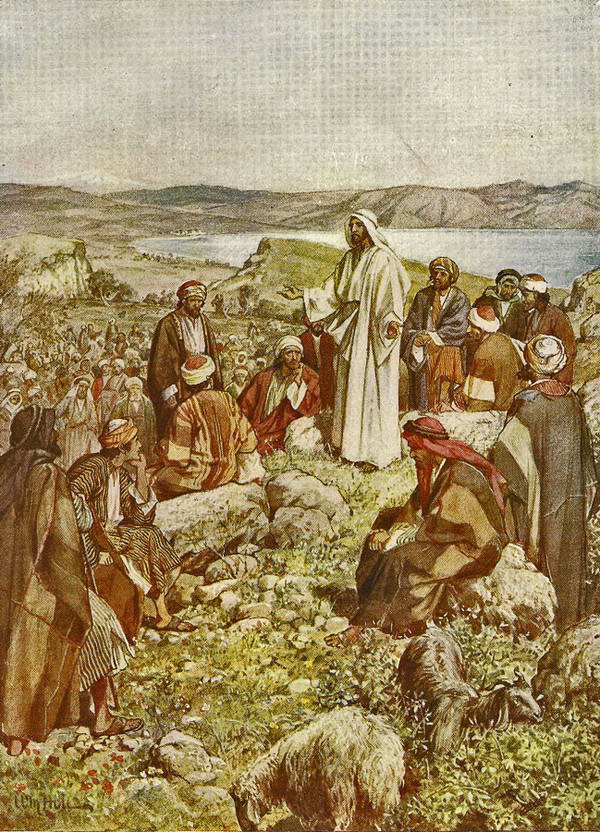
- "The Sermon On the Mount". From "The Life of Jesus" by William Hole (1900s)
- Book: Gospel of Matthew
- Christian Bible part: New Testament

Matthew 5:20 is the twentieth verse of the fifth chapter of the Gospel of Matthew in the New Testament and is part of the Sermon on the Mount. Jesus has reported that he came not to destroy the law, but fulfill it. But in this verse, he makes clear that the common understanding of the Law is not enough.

== Content ==
In the King James Version of the Bible the text reads:

For I say unto you, That except your righteousness
shall exceed the righteousness of the scribes and
Pharisees, ye shall in no case enter into the kingdom of heaven.

The World English Bible translates the passage as:

For I tell you that unless your righteousness exceeds
that of the scribes and Pharisees, there is no way
you will enter into the Kingdom of Heaven.

The Novum Testamentum Graece text is:

λέγω γὰρ ὑμῖν ὅτι ἐὰν μὴ περισσεύσῃ ὑμῶν ἡ δικαιοσύνη πλεῖον
τῶν γραμματέων καὶ Φαρισαίων,
οὐ μὴ εἰσέλθητε εἰς τὴν βασιλείαν τῶν οὐρανῶν.

For a collection of other versions see BibleRef Matthew 5:20

== Analysis ==
This verse closes the discussion of how strictly Christians must obey Mosaic law and introduces the next section where Jesus will show how the law as it was then followed was wrong. The Pharisees were the leading faction within Judaism at the time of Jesus, and are very poorly looked upon in the entire Gospel of Matthew. Schweizer notes that here Jesus does not doubt their righteousness, he just does not feel it is extensive enough. France notes that while in the previous verse those who relaxed the law were still admitted to the Kingdom of Heaven, those who take an overly legalistic approach to it are not admitted at all. The scribes were the recorders and interpreters of Mosaic law. Most of them were Pharisees, though not all, and not all Pharisees were scribes, though many were.

In Catholic Answers, Mark Brumley interprets this passage thus:

Jesus is "contrasting the external righteousness of the scribes and Pharisees with the interior righteousness that proceeds from the heart and which is to characterize his followers. Jesus is telling his disciples how to be righteous--not how to look righteous.

This is illustrated in Matthew 5 in Christ's teaching about anger and murder (Matt. 5:21-26), lust and adultery (Matt. 5:27-32), oaths and truth telling (Matt. 5:33-37), retaliation (Matt. 5:38-42), and the love of enemies (Matt. 5:43-48). In each of these areas, the concern is for internal righteousness and sanctity surpassing external performance."

Kingdom of Heaven is one of the author of Matthew's favourite phrases. Gundry notes that "enter the kingdom of heaven" appears three other times in the Gospel, at Matthew 7:21, 18:3, and 23:13.

== Commentary from the Church Fathers ==
Hilary of Poitiers: Beautiful entrance He here makes to a teaching beyond the works of the Law, declaring to the Apostles that they should have no admission to the kingdom of heaven without a righteousness beyond that of Pharisees.

Chrysostom: By righteousness is here meant universal virtue. But observe the superior power of grace, in that He requires of His disciples who were yet uninstructed to be better than those who were masters under the Old Testament. Thus He does not call the Scribes and Pharisees unrighteous, but speaks of their righteousness. And see how even herein He confirms the Old Testament that He compares it with the New, for the greater and the less are always of the same kind.

Pseudo-Chrysostom: The righteousness of the Scribes and Pharisees are the commandments of Moses; but the commandments of Christ are the fulfilment of that Law. This then is His meaning; Whosoever in addition to the commandments of the Law shall not fulfil My commandments, shall not enter into the kingdom of heaven. For those indeed save from the punishment due to transgressors of the Law, but do not bring into the kingdom; but My commandments both deliver from punishment, and bring into the kingdom. But seeing that to break the least commandments and not to keep them are one and the same, why does He say above of him that breaks the commandments, that he shall be the least in the kingdom of heaven, and here of him who keeps them not, that he shall not enter into the kingdom of heaven? See how to be the least in the kingdom is the same with not entering into the kingdom. For a man to be in the kingdom is not to reign with Christ, but only to be numbered among Christ's people; what He says then of him that breaks the commandments is, that he shall indeed be reckoned among Christians, yet the least of them. But he who enters into the kingdom, becomes partaker of His kingdom with Christ. Therefore, he who does not enter into the kingdom of heaven, shall not indeed have a part of Christ's glory, yet shall he be in the kingdom of heaven, that is, in the number of those over whom Christ reigns as King of heaven.

Augustine: Otherwise, unless your righteousness exceed the righteousness of the Scribes and Pharisees, that is, exceed that of those who break what themselves teach, as it is elsewhere said of them, They say, and do not; (Mat. 23:3.) just as if He had said, Unless your righteousness exceed in this way that ye do what ye teach, you shall not enter the kingdom of heaven. We must therefore understand something other than usual by the kingdom of heaven here, in which are to be both he who breaks what he teaches, and he who does it, but the one least, the other great; this kingdom of heaven is the present Church. In another sense is the kingdom of heaven spoken of that place where none enters but he who does what he teaches, and this is the Church as it shall be hereafter.

Augustine: This expression, the kingdom of heaven, so often used by our Lord, I know not whether any one would find in the books of the Old Testament. It belongs properly to the New Testament revelation, kept for His mouth whom the Old Testament figured as a King that should come to reign over His servants. This end, to which its precepts were to be referred, was hidden in the Old Testament, though even that had its saints who looked forward to the revelation that should be made.

Glossa Ordinaria: Or, we may explain by referring to the way in which the Scribes and Pharisees understood the Law, not to the actual contents of the Law.

Preceded by Matthew 5:19	Gospel of Matthew; Chapter 5	Succeeded by Matthew 5:21
