= Matthew 5:29 =

- ← 5:28 5:30 →
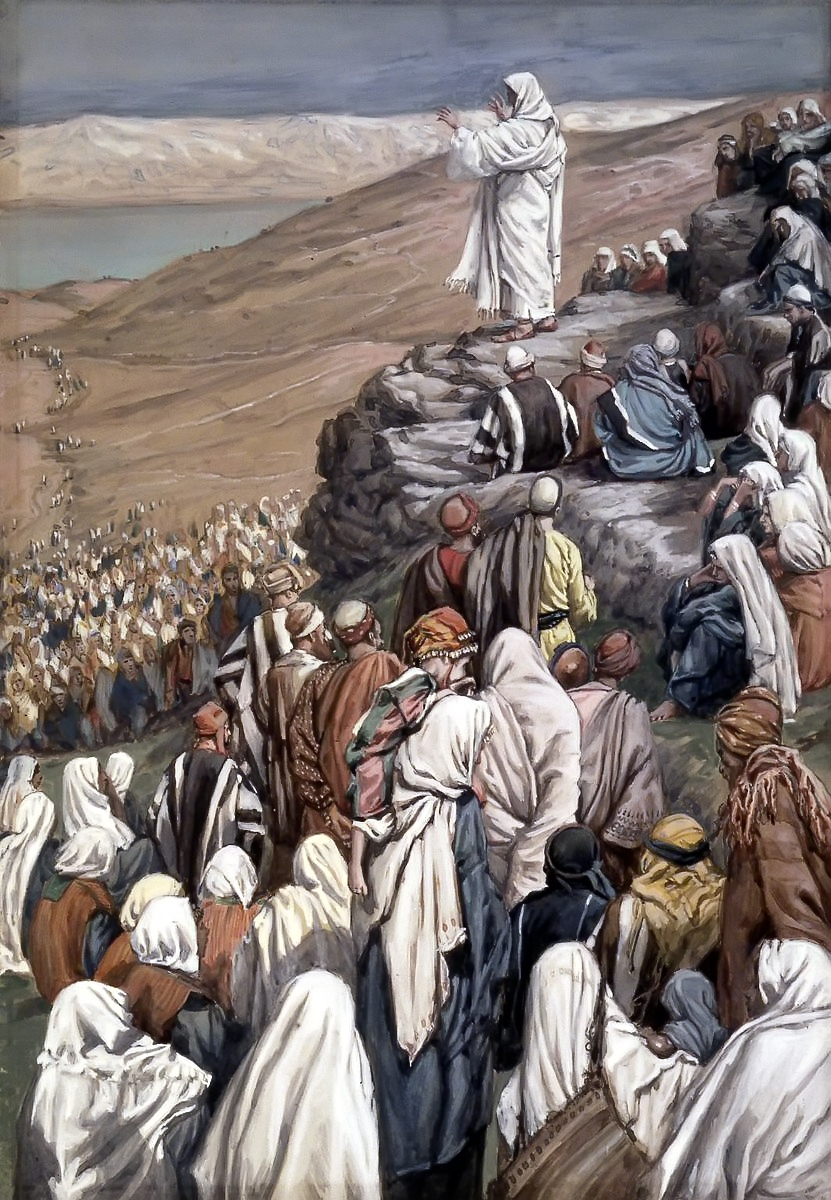
- The Sermon of the Beatitudes (1886-96) by James Tissot
- Book: Gospel of Matthew
- Christian Bible part: New Testament

Matthew 5:29 is the twenty-ninth verse of the fifth chapter of the Gospel of Matthew in the New Testament and is part of the Sermon on the Mount. It is the third verse of the discussion of adultery.

== Content ==
In the King James Version of the Bible the text reads:

And if thy right eye offend thee, pluck it out,
and cast it from thee: for it is profitable for
thee that one of thy members should perish, and
not that thy whole body should be cast into hell.

The World English Bible translates the passage as:

If your right eye causes you to stumble, pluck it
out and throw it away from you. For it is more
profitable for you that one of your members should
perish, than for your whole body to be cast into Gehenna.

The Novum Testamentum Graece text is:

εἰ δὲ ὁ ὀφθαλμός σου ὁ δεξιὸς σκανδαλίζει σε,
ἔξελε αὐτὸν καὶ βάλε ἀπὸ σοῦ
συμφέρει γάρ σοι ἵνα ἀπόληται ἓν τῶν μελῶν σου
καὶ μὴ ὅλον τὸ σῶμά σου βληθῇ εἰς γέενναν.

== Analysis ==
The Greek is literally "causes you to stumble," but stumble is a common metaphor for sin and some versions translate it this way for greater clarity. This loses the wordplay. Where normally eyesight is what prevents one from stumbling, Jesus here states that eyesight should be sacrificed to prevent the greater stumbling of sin. The verse is similar to Mark 9:47, and a version much closer to that in Mark appears at Matthew 18:9.

This verse, along with the next one, is the most extreme part of the Sermon on the Mount. R. T. France notes that the severity of this verse is unparalleled in the contemporary literature. It advocates an action that is extremely drastic. No major Christian denomination has ever taken this verse literally, no monk has ever plucked out his eye to prevent temptation (though it is rumored that the early church father Origen castrated himself, i.e. removed a body part that caused him to sin). Most commentators take this verse as a clear example of hyperbole, Jesus is using an extreme example to make sure his audience understands the importance of his teachings. Jones notes that the mention of only the right eye makes it clear that Jesus is not meaning for this to be taken literally, as the left eye would be just as likely to lead into sin. The obvious hyperbole of this passage have led some commentators to see other difficult parts of the Sermon as hyperbole, such as Matthew 5:39 and 40.

Jesus's hyperbolic language in Matthew stands out, as the Markan tradition of the same saying appears not to be hyperbolic. Tom de Bruin has argued that Jesus's original commands were meant to be taken literally, and that they are a method of dealing with demons that have gained a foothold in a person.

Nolland notes that within the harshness of this verse, there is also a message of redemption. If the sinner acts quickly to avoid sin, Gehenna will be avoided.

As with Matthew 5:22, the word translated in many versions as hell is Gehenna, and there is great debate about whether Jesus was talking about the physical valley of fire or an afterlife of damnation. Gundry feels that the reference to Gehenna is eschatological. He notes that the reference to the "whole body" implies that the wicked will also enjoy full body resurrection in the end times, prior to being thrown into Hell. This is counter to the standard understanding of only the worthy being resurrected. Gehenna appears six other times in the Gospel of Matthew: 5:22, 5:30, 10:28, 18:19, 23:15, and 23:33

== Commentary from the Church Fathers ==
Glossa Ordinaria: Because we ought not only to avoid actual sin, but even put away every occasion of sin, therefore having taught that adultery is to be avoided not in deed only, but in heart, He next teaches us to cut off the occasions of sin.

Pseudo-Chrysostom: But if according to that of the Prophet, there is no whole part in our body, (Ps. 38:3.) it is needful that we cut off every limb that we have that the punishment may be equal to the depravity of the flesh. Is it then possible to understand this of the bodily eye or hand? As the whole man when he is turned to God is dead to sin, so likewise the eye when it has ceased to look evil is cut off from sin. But this explanation will not suit the whole; for when He says, thy right eye offends thee, what does the left eye? Does it contradict the right eye, and it is preserved innocent?

Jerome: Therefore by the right eye and the right hand we must understand the love of brethren, husbands and wives, parents and kinsfolk; which if we find to hinder our view of the true light, we ought to sever from us.

Augustine: As the eye denotes contemplation, so the hand aptly denotes action. By the eye we must understand our most cherished friend, as they are wont to say who would express ardent affection, ‘I love him as my own eye.’ And a friend too who gives counsel, as the eye shows us our way. The right eye, perhaps, only means to express a higher degree of affection, for it is the one which men most fear to lose. Or, by the right eye may be understood one who counsels us in heavenly matters, and by the left one who counsels in earthly matters. And this will be the sense; Whatever that is which you love as you would your own right eye, if it offend you, that is, if it be an hindrance to your true happiness, cut it off and cast it from you. For if the right eye was not to be spared, it was superfluous to speak of the left. The right hand also is to be taken of a beloved assistant in divine actions, the left hand in earthly actions.

Pseudo-Chrysostom: Otherwise; Christ would have us careful not only of our own sin, but likewise that even they who pertain to us should keep themselves from evil. Have you any friend who looks to your matters as your own eye, or manages them as your own hand, if you know of any scandalous or base action that he has done, cast him from you, he is an offence; for we shall give account not only of our own sins, but also of such of those of our neighbours as it is in our power to hinder.

Hilary of Poitiers: Thus a more lofty step of innocence is appointed us, in that we are admonished to keep free, not only from sin ourselves, but from such as might touch as from without.

Jerome: Otherwise; As above He had placed lust in the looking on a woman, so now the thought and sense straying hither and thither He calls ‘the eye.’ By the right hand and the other parts of the body, He means the initial movements of desire and affection.

Pseudo-Chrysostom: The eye of flesh is the mirror of the inward eye. The body also has its own sense, that is, the left eye, and its own appetite, that is, the left hand. But the parts of the soul are called right, for the soul was created both with free-will and under the law of righteousness, that it might both see and do rightly. But the members of the body being not with free-will, but under the law of sin, are called the left. Yet He does not bid us cut off the sense or appetite of the flesh; we may retain the desires of the flesh, and yet not do thereafter, but we cannot cut off the having the desires. But when we wilfully purpose and think of evil, then our right desires and right will offend us, and therefore He bids us cut them off. And these we can cut off, because our will is free. Or otherwise; Everything, however good in itself that offends ourselves or others, we ought to cut off from us. For example, to visit a woman with religious purposes, this good intent towards her may be called a right eye, but if often visiting her I have fallen into the net of desire, or if any looking on are offended, then the right eye, that is, something in itself good, offends me. For the right eye is good intention, the right hand is good desire.

Glossa Ordinaria: Or; the right eye is the contemplative life which offends by being the cause of indolence or self-conceit, or in our weakness that we are not able to support it unmixed. The right hand is good works, or the active life, which offends us when we are ensnared by society and the business of life. If then any one is unable to sustain the contemplative life, let him not slothfully rest from all action; or on the other hand while he is taken up with action, dry up the fountain of sweet contemplation.

Saint Remigius: The reason why the right eye and the right hand are to be cast away is subjoined in that, For it is better, &c.

Pseudo-Chrysostom: For as we are every one members one of another, it is better that we should be saved without some one of these members, than that we perish together with them. Or, it is better that we should be saved without one good purpose, or one good work, than that while we seek to perform all good works we perish together with all.

Preceded by Matthew 5:28	Gospel of Matthew; Chapter 5	Succeeded by Matthew 5:30
