= Matthew 5:21 =

- ← 5:20 5:22 →
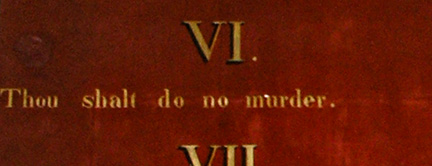
- "VI. Thou shalt do no murder." A portion of the 10 Commandments in the chapel in Fremantle Prison.
- Book: Gospel of Matthew
- Christian Bible part: New Testament

Matthew 5:21 is the twenty-first verse of the fifth chapter of the Gospel of Matthew in the New Testament and is part of the Sermon on the Mount. It opens the first of what have traditionally been known as the Antitheses in which Jesus compares the current interpretation of a part of Mosaic Law with how it should actually be understood. This verse begins the discussion of murder.

== Content ==
In the King James Version of the Bible the text reads:

Ye have heard that it was said of them of old
time, Thou shalt not kill; and whosoever
shall kill shall be in danger of the judgment:

The World English Bible translates the passage as:

"You have heard that it was said to the ancient
ones, ‘You shall not murder;' and ‘Whoever shall
murder shall be in danger of the judgment.’

The Novum Testamentum Graece text is:

Ἠκούσατε ὅτι ἐρρέθη τοῖς ἀρχαίοις
Οὐ φονεύσεις
ὃς δ’ ἂν φονεύσῃ, ἔνοχος ἔσται τῇ κρίσει.

For a collection of other versions see BibleHub Matthew 5:21

== Analysis ==
Schweizer notes that the opening line can be read as either "men of old said" or "it was said to men of old." However every New Testament usage of the impersonal passive, as in this line, refers to the word of God. Albright and Mann note that it would have been more usual to have "it was written" rather than "it was heard," they feel it was made aural so as to create a direct parallel with Jesus' words in the next verse. The ancient ones, or the ancestors, was in Greek used to primarily to refer to Greeks of the Heroic Age, but Albright and Mann note that among Greek speaking Jews it was a common expression for those who lived in the pre-Torah period. In this verse it fairly clearly refers to the Israelites after the Exodus.

Like the original Hebrew version of the Ten Commandments the Greek here, phoneuo more accurately translates as murder or assassinate rather than kill. Jacques Ellul disagreed with this interpretation and declared that it covered all killing of other human beings. The original commandment does not have "shall be in danger of the judgement," but this was commonly appended elsewhere, both in the Old Testament, such as at Genesis 9:6, Exodus 21:12, Leviticus 24:17, Numbers 35:16, and also in the many commentaries on the Law. All of these refer to judgement on Earth, not to divine judgement, a concept that did not exist in early Judaism. Scholars agree that here judgment refers to legal proceedings. Albright and Mann note that the Greek here is ambiguous and it could be read as "shall be in danger of performing judgment," but this reading makes little sense and the verse is always translated in the manner shown by the KJV and WEB.

The Evangelical Anglican Melvin Tinker writes, "Well, let's think through how the religious leaders of the time, the morally respectable Pharisees would have taken it. Well, quite literally. Here is the sixth commandment which speaks against taking a life-murder. And the minimum requirement person comes to this and asks 'Who does it apply to?... Does it mean that capital punishment is out or is it all right to kill those who have already killed? And what about war, is what goes on there with a soldier killing another soldier murder or should we become pacifists? Then what about the unborn? Is abortion ever to be thought of as murder? Or think about those in a persistent vegetative state, they don't seem fully human, so is it right to pull the plug on them? And suppose that I don't actively take steps to kill a person, instead I just leave them there to die, is that murdering them?' The danger with those sort of questions is that we are really looking for some loophole, trying to find circumstances in which we can murder, the minimum requirement you see. But Jesus cuts through all of that. The reason it is wrong to murder is that it is wrong to hate your brother. Hatred is the internal trigger of which the wilful disposal of a life is the external consequence. In other words, Jesus goes beyond the externals to that which is internal-motive- what moves us to such acts. He goes to the heart of the problem which is the human heart."

== Commentary from the Church Fathers ==
Augustine: For almost all the precepts which the Lord gave, saying, But I say unto you, are found in those ancient books. But because they knew not of any murder, besides the destruction of the body, the Lord shows them that every evil thought to the hurt of a brother is to be held for a kind of murder.

Pseudo-Chrysostom: Christ willing to show that He is the same God who spoke of old in the Law, and who now gives commandments in grace, now puts first of all his commandments (vid. Mat. 19:18.), that one which was the first in the Law, first, at least, of all those that forbade injury to our neighbour.

Augustine: We do not, because we have heard that, Thou shall not kill, deem it therefore unlawful to pluck a twig, according to the error of the Manichees, nor consider it to extend to irrational brutes; by the most righteous ordinance of the Creator their life and death is subservient to our needs. There remains, therefore, only man of whom we can understand it, and that not any other man, nor you only; for he who kills himself does nothing else but kill a man. Yet have not they in any way done contrary to this commandment who have waged wars under God's authority, or they who charged with the administration of civil power have by most just and reasonable orders inflicted death upon criminals. Also Abraham was not charged with cruelty, but even received the praise of piety, for that he was willing to obey God in slaying his son. Those are to be excepted from this command whom God commands to be put to death, either by a general law given, or by particular admonition at any special time. For he is not the slayer who ministers to the command, like a hilt to one smiting with a sword, nor is Samson otherwise to be acquitted for destroying himself along with his enemies, than because he was so instructed privily of the Holy Spirit, who through him wrought the miracles.

Chrysostom: This, it was said by them of old time, shows that it was long ago that they had received this precept. He says this that He might rouse His sluggish hearers to proceed to more sublime precepts, as a teacher might say to an indolent boy, Know you not how long time you have spent already in merely learning to spell? In that, I say unto you, mark the authority of the legislator, none of the old Prophets spoke thus; but rather, Thus saith the Lord. They as servants repeated the commands of their Lord; He as a Son declared the will of His Father, which was also His own. They preached to their fellow-servants; Ha as master ordained a law for his slaves.

| Preceded by Matthew 5:20 | Gospel of Matthew; Chapter 5 | Succeeded by Matthew 5:22 |
