= Matthew 5:30 =

- ← 5:29 5:31 →
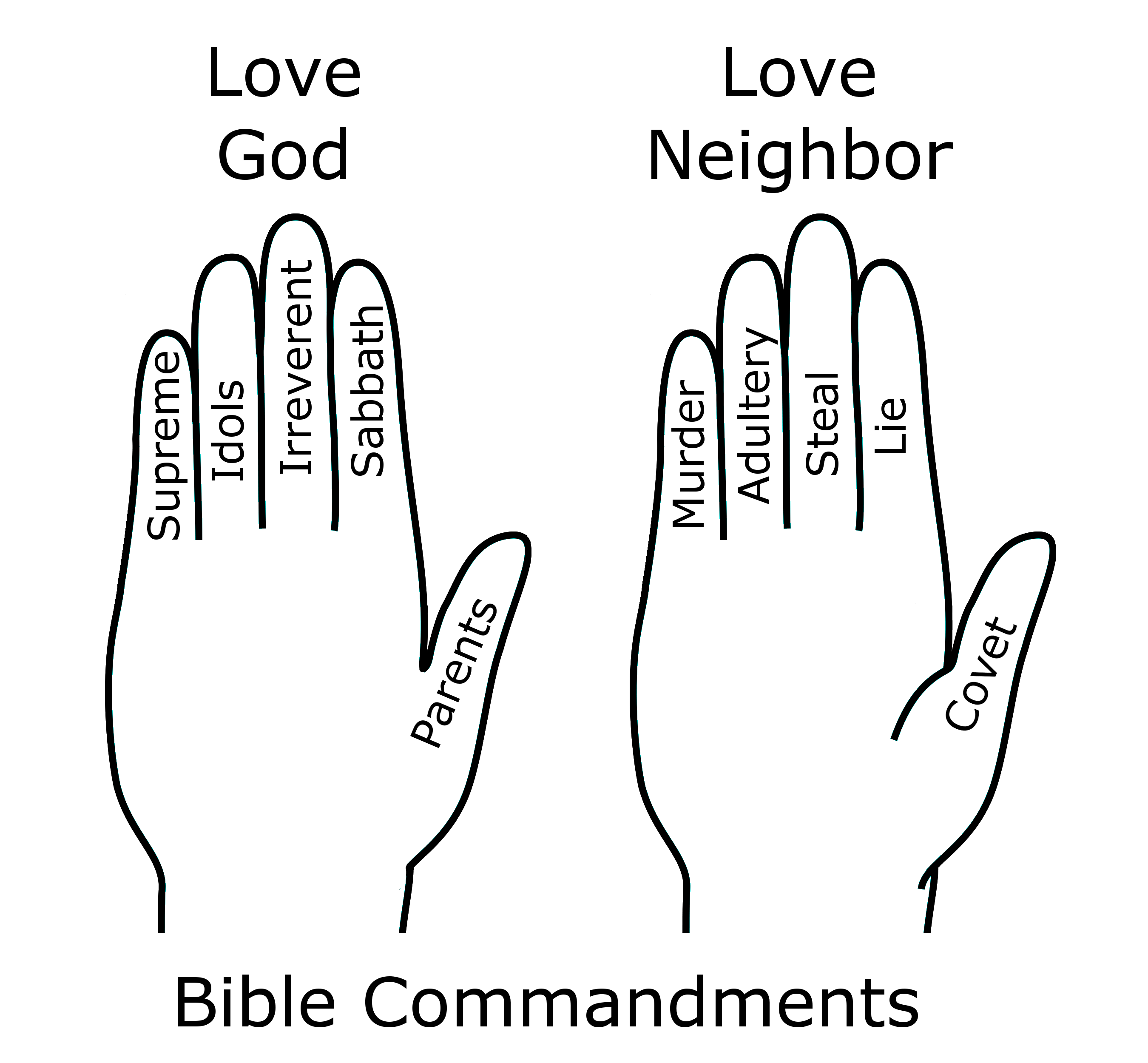
- Ten Commandments distilled down to a word or two each, and then associated with the fingers of the left and right hand as a mnemonic device.
- Book: Gospel of Matthew
- Christian Bible part: New Testament

Matthew 5:30 is the thirtieth verse of the fifth chapter of the Gospel of Matthew in the New Testament and is part of the Sermon on the Mount. Part of the section on adultery, it is very similar to the previous verse, but with the hand mentioned instead of the eye. For a discussion of the radicalism of these verses see Matthew 5:29. Jesus had stated that looking at a woman in lust is equal to the act of adultery itself and in this verse he hyperbolically recommends cutting off one's hand to prevent sinning.

== Content ==
In the King James Version of the Bible the text reads:

And if thy right hand offend thee, cut it off, and
cast it from thee: for it is profitable for thee
that one of thy members should perish, and not
that thy whole body should be cast into hell.

The World English Bible translates the passage as:

If your right hand causes you to stumble, cut it off,
and throw it away from you. For it is more profitable
for you that one of your members should perish, than
for your whole body to be cast into Gehenna.

The Novum Testamentum Graece text is:

καὶ εἰ ἡ δεξιά σου χεὶρ σκανδαλίζει σε,
ἔκκοψον αὐτὴν καὶ βάλε ἀπὸ σοῦ
συμφέρει γάρ σοι ἵνα ἀπόληται ἓν τῶν μελῶν σου
καὶ μὴ ὅλον τὸ σῶμά σου εἰς γέενναν ἀπέλθῃ.

For a collection of other versions see BibleHub Matthew 5:30

== Analysis ==
The link between the right hand and the discussion of adultery is somewhat unclear. In Jewish writings of the time it was common to have a foot, hand, eye triple structure. This full triple structure is seen in the similar discussions at Mark 9:43–47, and a version much closer to that in Mark appears at Matthew 18:8-9, which is talking about 'drastic corrective action', not 'literal mutilation', but nonetheless underscores the seriousness of the sin. Jesus here uses two thirds of the structure, the first reference to the eye is clearly linked to his previous statement that looking at a woman lustfully is sinful, but it is uncertain why he continues to the hand when he specifically stated that action and touching is not required for sin.

Hill feels that this might be related to theft as at that time the law saw adultery as a form of theft, as it was taking another man's wife. The right hand, the more active of the two among most of the population, had long been metaphorically associated with theft. De Bruin has argued that Jesus suggests removing body parts as a way to deal with demons that have gained a foothold in a person.

== Sources ==
- Allison, Dale C. Jr. (2007). "57. Matthew". In Barton, John; Muddiman, John (eds.). The Oxford Bible Commentary (first (paperback) ed.). Oxford University Press. pp. 844–886. ISBN 978-0199277186.
- Coogan, Michael David (2007). Coogan, Michael David; Brettler, Marc Zvi; Newsom, Carol Ann; Perkins, Pheme (eds.). The New Oxford Annotated Bible with the Apocryphal/Deuterocanonical Books: New Revised Standard Version, Issue 48 (Augmented 3rd ed.). Oxford University Press. ISBN 9780195288810.
- France, R. T. (1994). "Matthew". In Carson, D. A.; France, R. T.; Motyer, J. A.; Wenham, G. J. (eds.). New Bible Commentary: 21st Century Edition (4, illustrated, reprint, revised ed.). Inter-Varsity Press. pp. 904–945. ISBN 9780851106489.

Preceded by Matthew 5:29	Gospel of Matthew; Chapter 5	Succeeded by Matthew 5:31
