= Matthew 5:22 =

- ← 5:21 5:23 →
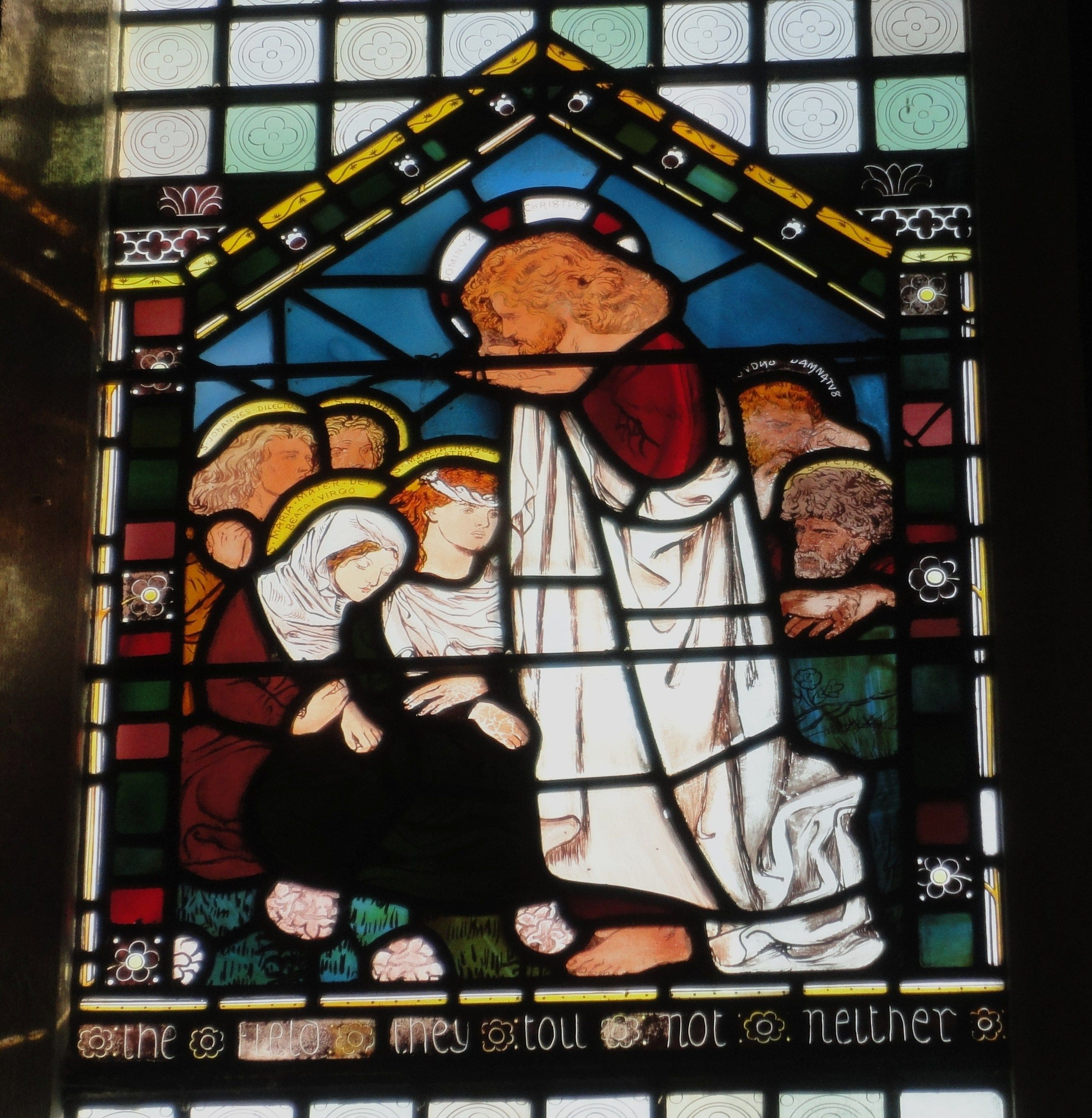
- "Sermon on the Mount" with "red headed Christ" on a stained window at All Saints Church, Selsley, Gloucestershire.
- Book: Gospel of Matthew
- Christian Bible part: New Testament

Matthew 5:22 is the twenty-second verse of the fifth chapter of the Gospel of Matthew in the New Testament and is part of the Sermon on the Mount. It is the first of what have traditionally been known as the 6 Antitheses. In this one, Jesus compares the current interpretation of "You shall not murder" from the Ten Commandments (Exodus 20:13; Deuteronomy 5:17) with his own interpretation.

This verse asserts that just as great a crime as murder itself is the anger that leads to it. Schweizer notes that this view is not particularly new to Jesus, appearing in the Old Testament at places such as Ecclesiastes 7:9 and in works such as Sirach, the Slavonic Enoch, Pesahim, and Nedraim.

== Content ==
The Koine Greek text, according to Westcott and Hort, reads:

εγω δε λεγω υμιν οτι πας ο οργιζομενος τω αδελφω αυτου
ενοχος εσται τη κρισει ος δ αν ειπη τω αδελφω αυτου
ρακα ενοχος εσται τω συνεδριω ος δ αν ειπη μωρε
ενοχος εσται εις την γεενναν του πυρος

In the King James Version of the Bible the text reads:

But I say unto you, That whosoever is angry with his
brother without a cause shall be in danger of the
judgment: and whosoever shall say to his brother, Raca,
shall be in danger of the council: but whosoever shall
say, Thou fool, shall be in danger of hell fire.

The World English Bible translates the passage as:

But I tell you, that everyone who is angry with his
brother without a cause shall be in danger of the
judgment; and whoever shall say to his brother, 'Raca!'
shall be in danger of the council; and whoever shall say,
'You fool!' shall be in danger of the fire of Gehenna.

For a collection of other versions see BibleHub Matthew 5:22

== Analysis ==
This verse asserts that just as great a crime as murder itself is the anger that leads to it. Schweizer notes that this view is not particularly new to Jesus, appearing in the Old Testament at places such as Ecclesiastes 7:9 and in works such as Sirach, the Slavonic Enoch, Pesahim, and Nedraim. A similar teaching also appears at 1 John 3:15. Gundry notes that "I say to you" is one of Matthew's favourite phrases, used 68 times. Schweizer feels it is used here to link to the word of God in the previous verse.

Davies and Allison note that the references to brothers is probably an allusion to the story of Cain and Abel. Nolland notes that the word usually translated as brother is gender neutral in the original Greek, and is more accurately translated as "brother or sister." Harrington notes that brother does not literally refer to sibling, or even to just the small group of followers or disciples. Rather he states that the verse should be read as referring to all Israelites or all human beings. France disagrees, feeling that in this particular verse Jesus is referring only to the group of disciples.

Early manuscripts are divided between whether this verse should read "whosoever is angry with his brother without a cause shall be in danger of the judgment" or "whosoever is angry with his brother shall be in danger of the judgment." The two versions are significantly different in implication and most modern scholars feel that "without a cause" was a later addition by a copyist trying to make the statement less radical. This was also the view of some Church Fathers, while Augustine of Hippo for example believed that "without cause", which many copies in his time included, was correct and that it should even be added to the three following statements since otherwise Paul the Apostle would be condemned, for "he calls the Galatians fools, though he considers them his brethren; for he did it not without cause."

=== Insults ===
The word Raca is original to the Greek manuscript; however, it is not a Greek word. The most common view is that it is a reference to the Aramaic word reka, which literally means "empty one", but probably meant "empty headed," or "foolish." Scholars seem divided on how grievous an insult it was: Hill feels it was very grievous while France thinks it was a minor slur. The word translated as fool is the Greek moros, which has a similar meaning to the Aramaic reka. However moros also was used to mean godless, and thus could be much more severe a term than reka. The reading of godless can explain why the punishment is more severe. Jesus uses the term himself in Matthew 23:17 when he is deriding the Pharisees.

This verse has also recently become part of the debate over the New Testament view of homosexuality. Some scholars have argued that raca can mean effeminate, and was a term of abuse for homosexuals. Similarly moros can also refer to a homosexual aggressor; as Genesis 19:4–6. From Semitic cognates Warren Johansson argued that the word was an Aramaic pejorative, similar to the English words faggot or fairy.

=== Punishments ===
While some scholars have searched for one, the offenses in the verse do not seem to increase in severity. By contrast the verse contains an escalating scale of punishment. Those that are angry with their brother are said to be subject to judgment. This is often interpreted as the judgement of the local council, which would mete out justice in a community. The council is generally seen as a reference to the Sanhedrin, the council of leading religious thinkers that acted as the central court in Jerusalem. Most controversial is what fate is implied by the third punishment. In Greek the word used is Gehenna, it refers to a valley south of Jerusalem where there was an ever-burning rubbish fire, and where in the past human sacrifices were committed. However, Hermann Strack and Paul Billerbeck state that there is neither archaeological nor literary evidence in support of this claim, in either the earlier intertestamental or the later rabbinic sources. Also, Lloyd R. Bailey's "Gehenna: The Topography of Hell" from 1986 holds a similar view.

In the Old Testament, followers of various Ba'als and gods in the Canaanite pantheon, including Moloch, sacrificed their children by fire, especially in the area Tophet (2 Chronicles 28:3, 33:6). Thereafter it was deemed to be cursed (Jeremiah 7:31, 19:2–6).

Some scholars believe this to be a metaphor for damnation and for Hell, and traditionally it was translated this way. Albright and Mann reject this view and conclude that Jesus was here literally referring to the valley and the potential of being thrown in there as punishment. Gehenna appears six other times in the Gospel of Matthew: 5:29, 5:30, 10:28, 18:19, 23:15, and 23:33

Some scholars reject the idea that the first two sections refer to secular institutions. Albright and Mann argue that only God could know a person's internal emotions, and no human institution could punish such crimes. Hill argues that this verse has been misunderstood as applying to the general population. He believes that the reference to brothers means that these rules are not meant for society at large, but only the disciples and leaders of the new religion, and that the council refers to an internal structure.

== Commentary from the Church Fathers ==
Pseudo-Chrysostom: He who is angry without cause shall be judged; but he who is angry with cause shall not be judged. For if there were no anger, neither teaching would profit, nor judgments hold, nor crimes be controlled. So that he who on just cause is not angry, is in sin; for an unreasonable patience sows vices, breeds carelessness, and invites the good as well as the bad to do evil.

Jerome: Some copies add here the words, without cause; but by the true reading the precept is made unconditional, and anger altogether forbidden. For when we are told to pray for them that persecute us, all occasion of anger is taken away. The words without cause then must be erased, for the wrath of man works not the righteousness of God.

Pseudo-Chrysostom: Yet that anger which arises from just cause is indeed not anger, but a sentence of judgment. For anger properly means a feeling of passion; but he whose anger arises from just cause does not suffer any passion, and is rightly said to sentence, not to be angry with.

Augustine: This also we affirm should be taken into consideration, what is being angry with a brother; for he is not angry with a brother who is angry at his offence. He then it is who is angry without cause, who is angry with his brother, and not with the offence.

Augustine: But to be angry with a brother to the end that he may be corrected, there is no man of sound mind who forbids. Such sort of motions as come of love of good and of holy charity, are not to be called vices when they follow right reason.

Pseudo-Chrysostom: But I think that Christ does not speak of anger of the flesh, but anger of the heart; for the flesh cannot be so disciplined as not to feel the passion. When then a man is angry but refrains from doing what his anger prompts him, his flesh is angry, but his heart is free from anger.

Chrysostom: Or, Racha is a word signifying contempt, and worthlessness. For where we in speaking to servants or children say, Go thou, or, Tell thou him; in Syriac they would say Racha for ‘thou.’ For the Lord descends to the smallest trifles even of our behaviour, and bids us treat one another with mutual respect.

Jerome: Or, Racha is a Hebrew word signifying, ‘empty,’ ‘vain;’ as we might say in the common phrase of reproach, ‘empty-pate.’ Observe that He says brother; for who is our brother, but he who has the same Father as ourselves?

Pseudo-Chrysostom: And it were an unworthy reproach to him who has in him the Holy Spirit to call him ‘empty.’

Augustine: In the third case are three things; anger, the voice expressive of anger, and a word of reproach, Thou fool. Thus here are three different degrees of sin; in the first when one is angry, but keeps the passion in his heart without giving any sign of it. If again he suffers any sound expressive of the passion to escape him, it is more than had he silently suppressed the rising anger; and if he speaks a word which conveys a direct reproach, it is a yet greater sin.

Rabanus Maurus: The Saviour here names the torments of hell, Gehenna, a name thought to be derived from a valley consecrate to idols near Jerusalem, and filled of old with dead bodies, and defiled by Josiah, as we read in the Book of Kings.

Chrysostom: This is the first mention of hell, though the kingdom of Heaven had been mentioned some time before, which shows that the gifts of the one comes of His love, the condemnation of the other of our sloth. Many thinking this a punishment too severe for a mere word, say that this was said figuratively. But I fear that if we thus cheat ourselves with words here, we shall suffer punishment in deed there. Think not then this too heavy a punishment, when so many sufferings and sins have their beginning in a word; a little word has often begotten a murder, and overturned whole cities. And yet it is not to be thought a little word that denies a brother reason and understanding by which we are men, and differ from the brutes.

Pseudo-Chrysostom: In danger of the council; that is, (according to the interpretation given by the Apostles in their Constitutions,) in danger of being one of that Council which condemned Christ.

Hilary of Poitiers: Or, he who reproaches with emptiness one full of the Holy Spirit, will be arraigned in the assembly of the Saints, and by their sentence will be punished for an affront against that Holy Spirit Himself.

Augustine: Should any ask what greater punishment is reserved for murder, if evil-speaking is visited with hell-fire? This obliges us to understand, that there are degrees in hell.

Chrysostom: Or, the judgment and the council denote punishment in this word; hell-fire future punishment. He denounces punishment against anger, yet does not mention any special punishment, showing therein that it is not possible that a man should be altogether free from the passion. The Council here means the Jewish senate, for He would not seem to be always superseding all their established institutions, and introducing foreign.

Augustine: In all these three sentences there are some words understood. In the first indeed, as many copies read without cause, there is nothing to be supplied. In the second, He who saith to his brother, Racha, we must supply the words, without cause; and again, in He who says, Thou fool, two things are understood, to his brother, and, without cause. And this forms the defence of the Apostle, when he calls the Galatians fools, though he considers them his brethren; for he did it not without cause.

Preceded by Matthew 5:21	Gospel of Matthew; Chapter 5	Succeeded by Matthew 5:23
