= Matthew 5:25 =

Bible verse in the Gospel of Matthew, part of the Sermon on the Mount

- ← 5:24 5:26 →
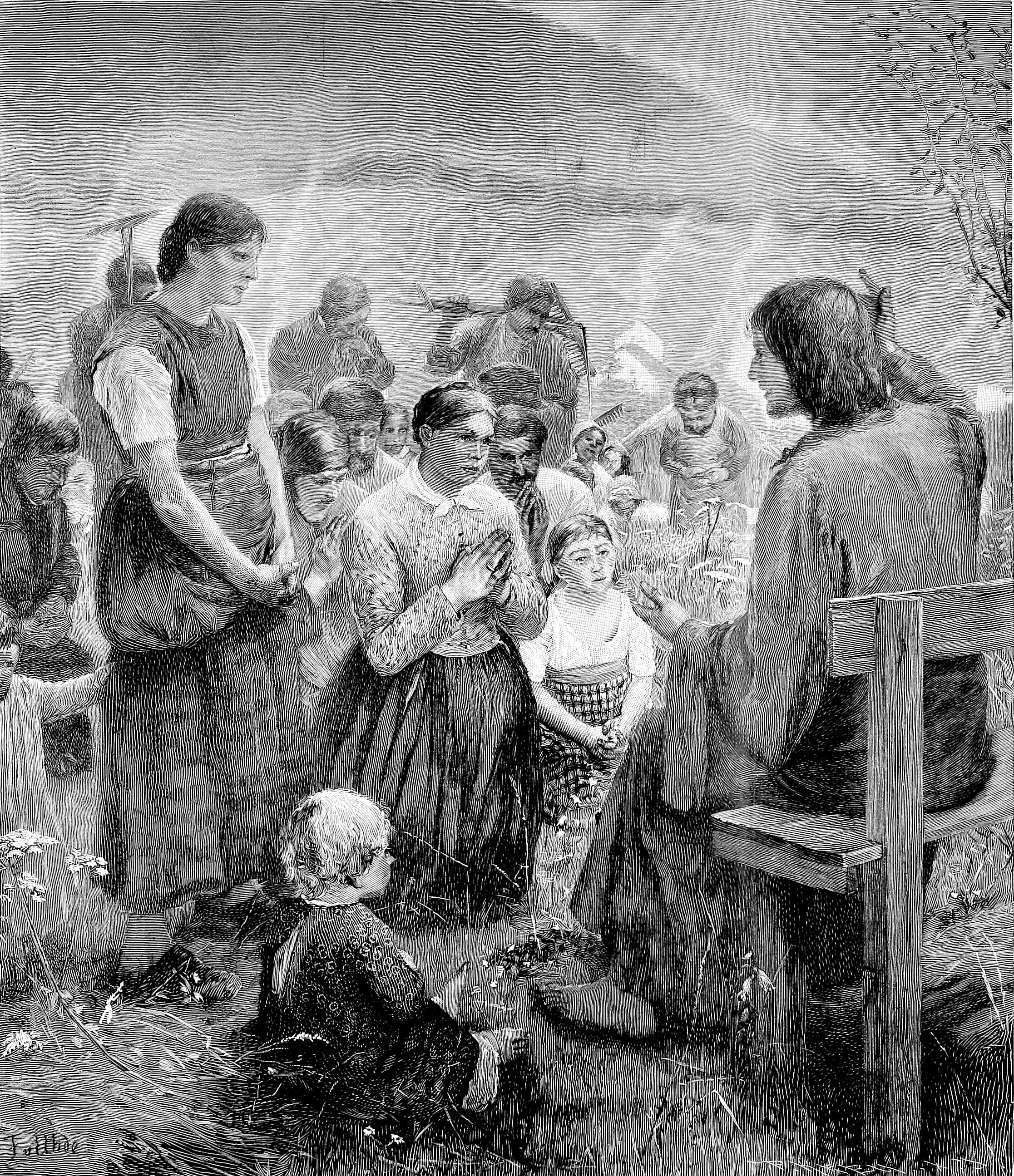
- Sermon on the Mount (1887) by Uhde.
- Book: Gospel of Matthew
- Christian Bible part: New Testament

Matthew 5:25 is the twenty-fifth verse of the fifth chapter of the Gospel of Matthew in the New Testament and is part of the Sermon on the Mount. In this first of the 6 Antitheses Jesus has been attacking anger and advocating reconciliation. In this verse he states that it is prudential to quickly reach agreement with one's adversary.

== Content ==
In the King James Version of the Bible the text reads:

Agree with thine adversary quickly, whiles thou art in the way with him; lest at any time the adversary deliver thee to the judge, and the judge deliver thee to the officer, and thou be cast into prison.

The World English Bible translates the passage as:

Agree with your adversary quickly, while you are with him in the way; lest perhaps the prosecutor deliver you to the judge, and the judge deliver you to the officer, and you be cast into prison.

The Novum Testamentum Graece text is:

ἴσθι εὐνοῶν τῷ ἀντιδίκῳ σου ταχὺ ἕως ὅτου εἶ μετ’ αὐτοῦ ἐν τῇ ὁδῷ μή ποτέ σε παραδῷ ὁ ἀντίδικος τῷ κριτῇ, καὶ ὁ κριτὴς τῷ ὑπηρέτῃ, καὶ εἰς φυλακὴν βληθήσῃ·

For a collection of other versions see BibleHub Matthew 5:25.

== Analysis ==
This verse is very similar to Luke 12:58. In the Gospel of Matthew this verse could be interpreted as practical advice for staying out of prison. In Luke the context makes clear that it is an eschatological metaphor, with the judge being God and prison eternal punishment. Most interpret Matthew the same way. Albright and Mann have difficulty with this metaphor, as there is no space for an accuser who should be reconciled in the last judgement. Albright and Mann are also uncomfortable at how closely this verse links good behaviour to the promise of avoiding punishment. They thus feel that some material is likely missing from this section.

The Greek translation has a slightly different meaning. Instead of "agree" it may be translated as "quickly have kind thoughts for..." or "be well disposed toward..."

== Commentary from the Church Fathers ==
Hilary of Poitiers: The Lord suffers us at no time to be wanting in peaceableness of temper, and therefore bids us be reconciled to our adversary quickly, while on the road of life, lest we be cast into the season of death before peace be joined between us.

Jerome: The word here in our Latin books is ‘consentiens,’ in Greek, εὐνοῶν, which means, ‘kind,’ ‘benevolent.’

Augustine: Let us see who this adversary is to whom we are bid to be benevolent, It may then be either the Devil, or man, or the flesh, or God, or His commandments. But I do not see how we can be bid be benevolent, or agreeing with the Devil; for where there is good will, there is friendship, and no one will say that friendship should be made with the Devil, or that it is well to agree with him, having once proclaimed war against him when we renounced him; nor ought we to consent with him, with whom had we never consented, we had never come into such circumstances,

Jerome: Some, from that verse of Peter, Your adversary the Devil, &c. (1 Pet. 5:8.) will have the Saviour’s command to be, that we should be merciful to the Devil, not causing him to endure punishment for our sakes. For as he puts in our way the incentives to vice, if we yield to his suggestions, he will be tormented for our sakes. Some follow a more forced interpretation, that in baptism we have each of us made a compact with the Devil by renouncing him. If we observe this compact, then we are agreeing with our adversary, and shall not be cast into prison.

Augustine: I do not see again how it can be understood of man. For how can man be said to deliver us to the Judge, when we know only Christ as the Judge, before whose tribunal all must be sisted. How then can he deliver to the Judge, who has himself to appear before Him? Moreover if any has sinned against any by killing him, he has no opportunity of agreeing with him in the way, that is in this life; and yet that hinders not but that he may be rescued from judgment by repentance. Much less do I see how we can be bid be agreeing with the flesh; for they are sinners rather who agree with it; but they who bring it into subjection, do not agree with it, but compel it to agree with them.

Jerome: And how can the body be cast into prison if it agree not with the spirit, seeing soul and body must go together, and that the flesh can do nothing but what the soul shall command?

Jerome: But from the context the sense is manifest; the Lord is exhorting us to peace and concord with our neighbour; as it was said above, Go, be reconciled to thy brother.

Pseudo-Chrysostom: The Lord is urgent with us to hasten to make friends with our enemies while we are yet in this life, knowing how dangerous for us that one of our enemies should die before peace is made with us. For if death bring us while yet at enmity to the Judge, he will deliver us to Christ, proving us guilty by his judgment. Our adversary also delivers us to the Judge, when he is the first to seek reconciliation; for he who first submits to his enemy, brings him in guilty before God.

Hilary of Poitiers: Or, the adversary delivers you to the Judge, when the abiding of your wrath towards him convicts you.

Augustine: By the Judge, I understand Christ, for, the Father hath committed all judgment to the Son; (John 5:22.) and by the officer, or minister, an Angel, for, Angels came and ministered unto Him; and we believe that He will come with his Angels to judge.

Pseudo-Chrysostom: The officer, that is, the ministering Angel of punishment, and he shall cast you into the prison of hell.

Augustine: By the prison, I understand the punishment of the darkness. And that none should despise that punishment, He adds, Verily I say unto thee, thou shalt not come out thence till thou hast paid the very last farthing.

| Preceded by Matthew 5:24 | Gospel of Matthew; Chapter 5 | Succeeded by Matthew 5:26 |
