= Matthew 5:23–24 =

- ← 5:22 5:25 →
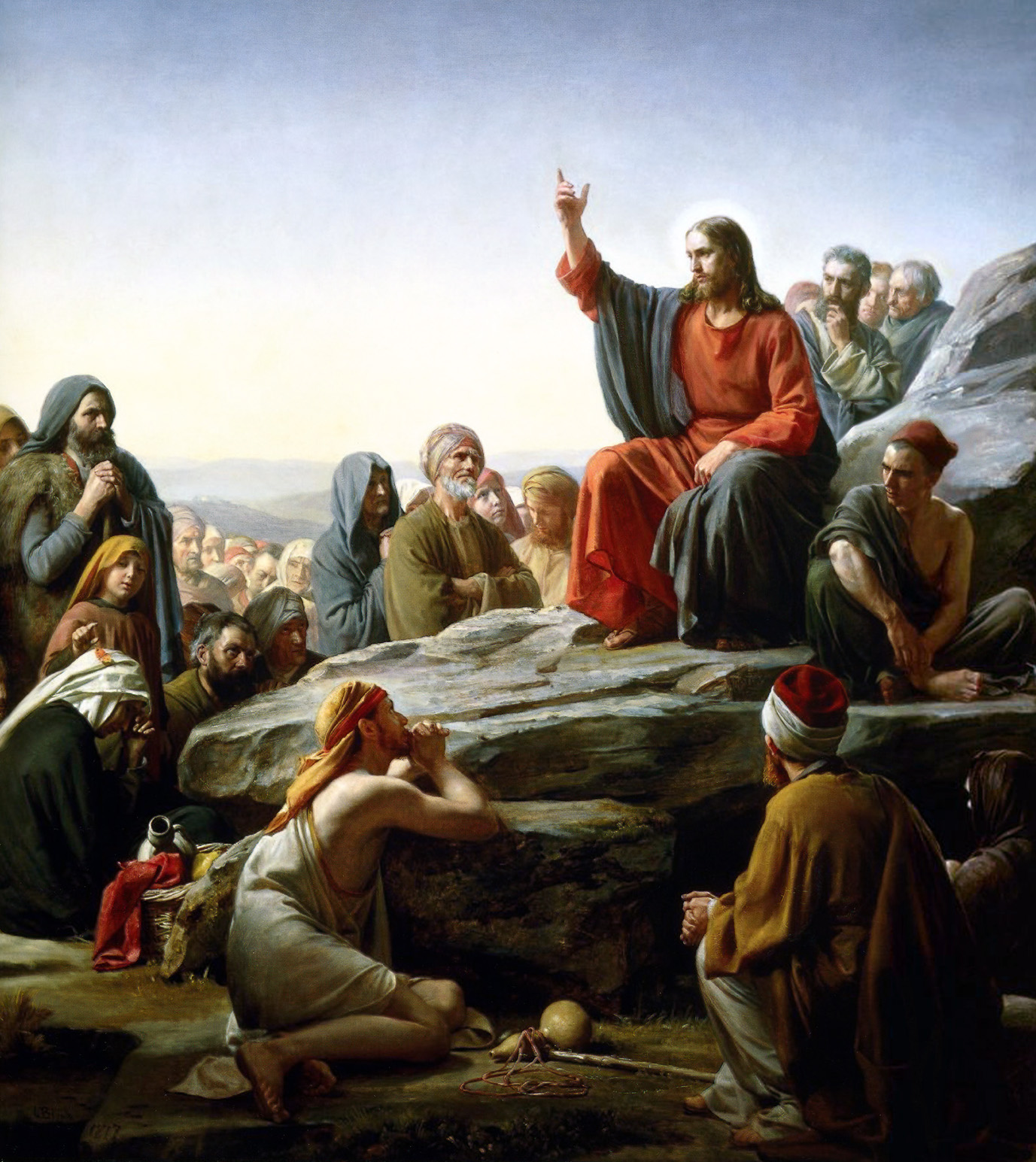
- Sermon on the Mount by Carl Bloch
- Book: Gospel of Matthew
- Christian Bible part: New Testament

Matthew 5:23 and Matthew 5:24 are a pair of closely related verses in the fifth chapter of the Gospel of Matthew in the New Testament. They are part of the Sermon on the Mount. Jesus has just announced that anger leads to murder, and anger is just as bad as murder itself. And that whosoever is angry with his brother shall be in danger of the judgment himself. This verse states that resolving these disputes should take priority over religious rituals.

== Content ==
In the King James Version of the Bible the text reads:

23 Therefore if thou bring thy gift to the altar, and there
rememberest that thy brother hath ought against thee;
24 Leave there thy gift before the altar, and go thy way; first
be reconciled to thy brother, and then come and offer thy gift.

The World English Bible translates the passage as:

23 "If therefore you are offering your gift at the altar, and
there remember that your brother has anything against you,
24 leave your gift there before the altar, and go your way. First
be reconciled to your brother, and then come and offer your gift.

The Novum Testamentum Graece text is:

23 ἐὰν οὖν προσφέρῃς τὸ δῶρόν σου ἐπὶ τὸ θυσιαστήριον
κἀκεῖ μνησθῇς ὅτι ὁ ἀδελφός σου ἔχει τι κατὰ σοῦ,
24 ἄφες ἐκεῖ τὸ δῶρόν σου ἔμπροσθεν τοῦ θυσιαστηρίου:

καὶ ὕπαγε πρῶτον διαλλάγηθι τῷ ἀδελφῷ σου, καὶ τότε ἐλθὼν πρόσφερε τὸ δῶρόν σου.

For a collection of other versions see BibleHub Matthew 5:23-For a collection of other versions see 24

== Analysis ==
These verses describe the ritual of offering a sacrifice to God at the Temple, known as the korban. This was generally an animal such as a sheep. For the average believer the offering of a sacrifice at the Temple would have been a rare and important event. Nolland notes that common worshipers would not themselves ever place a gift on the altar; this was reserved for priests. Betz theorized that a revised practice may have been adopted by the Jewish Christians, but Nolland does not consider this credible as the priests would not have permitted such behaviour in the Temple. Nolland thinks the verse is simply using it as a turn of phrase to describe the entire sacrifice ritual.

France notes that this would be one of the only times a layman would ever approach the altar of the Temple. What Jesus is believed to be saying is that even if in the middle of this process one realizes that there is a dispute with one's brother, that it would be better in God's eyes to go and immediately try to resolve the dispute and then to resume the ritual.

This is often linked to Matthew's continued theme of attacking the overly ritualized religion of the Pharisees, who, according to Schweizer, taught that a sacrifice should not be interrupted. However, the statements expressed here are far from unique to Jesus. Throughout the Old Testament and Jewish commentaries it is asserted that worship without a moral life is useless.

Albright and Mann note that this verse is one of the most important pieces of evidence for the Gospel of Matthew being written before 70 CE. In that year the Temple of Jerusalem was destroyed by the Romans in the First Jewish–Roman War. This destruction meant that the korban ritual came to a halt. They argue that if this ritual was no longer being practiced when Matthew was written, why would the author have included this discussion of it? Nolland does not consider this verse conclusive as even after the destruction of the Temple the Jewish community continued to pay close attention to the ritual laws surrounding it as they expected it to soon be rebuilt. Harrington notes that the Mishnah of 200 CE writes as though the Temple was still standing.

== Commentary from the Church Fathers ==
Pseudo-Chrysostom: But if it is he that hath done you the wrong, and yet you be the first to seek reconciliation, you shall have a great reward.

Chrysostom: If love alone is not enough to induce us to be reconciled to our neighbour, the desire that our work should not remain imperfect, and especially in the holy place, should induce us.

Gregory the Great: Lo He is not willing to accept sacrifice at the hands of those who are at variance. Hence then consider how great an evil is strife, which throws away what should be the means of remission of sin.

Pseudo-Chrysostom: See the mercy of God, that He thinks rather of man's benefit than of His own honour; He loves concord in the faithful more than offerings at His altar; for so long as there are dissensions among the faithful, their gift is not looked upon, their prayer is not heard. For no one can be a true friend at the same time to two who are enemies to each other. In like manner, we do not keep our fealty to God, if we do not love His friends and hate His enemies. But such as was the offence, such should also be the reconciliation. If you have offended in thought, be reconciled in thought; if in words, be reconciled in words; if in deeds, in deeds be reconciled. For so it is in every sin, in whatsoever kind it was committed, in that kind is the penance done.

Hilary of Poitiers: He bids us when peace with our fellow-men is restored, then to return to peace with God, passing from the love of men to the love of God; then go and offer thy gift.

Augustine: If this direction be taken literally, it might lead some to suppose that this ought indeed to be so done if our brother is present, for that no long time can be meant when we are bid to leave our offering there before the altar. For if he be absent, or possibly beyond sea, it is absurd to suppose that the offering must be left before the altar; to be offered after we have gone over land and sea to seek him. Wherefore we must embrace an inward, spiritual sense of the whole, if we would understand it without involving any absurdity. The gift which we offer to God, whether learning, or speech, or whatever it be, cannot be accepted of God unless it be supported by faith. If then we have in aught harmed a brother, we must go and be reconciled with him, not with the bodily feet, but in thoughts of the heart, when in humble contrition you may cast yourself at your brother's feet in sight of Him whose offering you are about to offer. For thus in the same manner as though He were present, you may with unfeigned heart seek His forgiveness; and returning thence, that is, bringing back again your thoughts to what you had first begun to do, may make your offering.

Augustine: If it be not lawful to be angry with a brother, or to say to him Racha, or Thou fool, much less is it lawful to keep in the memory any thing which might convert anger into hate.

Jerome: It is not, If thou hast ought against thy brother; but, If thy brother has ought against thee, that the necessity of reconciliation may be more imperative.

Augustine: And he has somewhat against us when we have wronged him; and we have somewhat against him when he has wronged us, in which case there were no need to go to be reconciled to him, seeing we had only to forgive him, as we desire the Lord to forgive us.

Preceded by Matthew 5:22	Gospel of Matthew; Chapter 5	Succeeded by Matthew 5:25
