= Thou shalt not kill =

One of the Ten Commandments

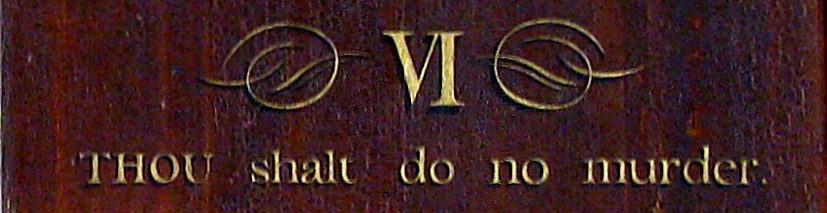
The Sixth Commandment, as translated by the Book of Common Prayer (1549). The image is from the altar screen of the Temple Church near the Law Courts in London.

Thou shalt not kill (LXX, KJV; Ancient Greek: Οὐ φονεύσεις, romanized: Ou phoneúseis), You shall not murder (NIV, Biblical Hebrew: לֹא תִּרְצָח, romanized: Lo tirṣaḥ) or Do not murder (CSB) is a moral imperative included as one of the Ten Commandments in the Torah.

The imperative not to kill is in the context of unlawful killing resulting in bloodguilt.

== Hebrew Bible ==
=== Retzach ===
The commandment against murder can be viewed as a legal matter governing human relationships, noting that the first four commandments relate strongly to man's duty to God and that the latter six commandments describe duties toward humans. The commandment against murder can also be viewed as based in respect for God himself. "The voice of your brother's blood is crying to me from the ground. And now you are cursed from the ground, which has opened its mouth to receive your brother's blood from your hand." Genesis 4:10–11 (ESV)

The Genesis narrative also portrays the prohibition of shedding innocent blood as an important aspect of God's covenant with Noah.

Whoever sheds the blood of man, by man shall his blood be shed, for God made man in his own image.

— Genesis 9:6 (ESV)

The Torah portrays murder as a capital crime and describes a number of details in the moral understanding and legal implementation of consequences. The Priestly Code allowed the victim's next of kin (avenger of blood) to exact retribution on the suspect; but the accused could seek sanctuary in a city of refuge. The right of the avenger of blood to such revenge ceased, upon the death of the person who was the Jewish High Priest at the time of the crime.

Another verb meaning "to kill, slay, murder, destroy, ruin" is h-r-g, used of Cain slaying Abel in Genesis 4:8. When Cain is driven into exile, complaining that "every one that findeth me shall slay me" in Genesis 4:14, he again uses this verb (h-r-g). Eliezer Segal observes that the Septuagint uses the term harag, and that Augustine of Hippo recognized that this did not extend to wars or capital punishment. Most subsequent translations follow Jerome's Vulgate. While Jerome had access to Jewish scholars, "even the Jewish translators were not unanimous in maintaining a consistent distinctions between the various Hebrew roots."

In a more modern analysis, Wilma Ann Bailey also finds a broader application of the word retzach.

=== Justified killing: due consequence for crime ===
The Torah and Hebrew Bible made clear distinctions between the shedding of innocent blood versus killing as the due consequence of a crime. A number of sins were considered to be worthy of the death penalty including murder, incest, bearing false witness (perjury) in proceedings of a capital charge, adultery, idolatry, bestiality, child sacrifice to pagan gods, cursing a parent, fortune-telling, and other sins.

For example, the Exodus narrative describes the people as having turned to idolatry with the golden calf while Moses was on the mountain receiving the law from God. When Moses came down, he commanded the Levites to take up the sword against their brothers and companions and neighbors. The Levites obeyed and killed about three thousand men who had sinned in worship of the golden calf. As a result, Moses said that the Levites had received a blessing that day at the cost of son and brother. On a separate occasion, a blasphemer was stoned to death because he blasphemed the name of the Lord (Yahweh) with a curse.

The Hebrew Bible has many other examples of sinners being put to death as due consequence for crimes. Achan is put to death by Joshua because he caused defeat of Israel's army by taking some of the plunder and hiding it in his tent. David ordered that an Amalekite be put to death because he claimed to have killed King Saul. Following the advice of his father, Solomon ordered that Joab be killed:

Strike him down and bury him, and so clear me and my father's house of the guilt of the innocent blood that Joab shed. The Lord will repay him for the blood he shed, because without the knowledge of my father David he attacked two men and killed them with the sword. Both of them—Abner son of Ner, commander of Israel's army, and Amasa son of Jether, commander of Judah's army—were better men and more upright than he. May the guilt of their blood rest on the head of Joab and his descendants forever. But on David and his descendants, his house and his throne, may there be the Lord's peace forever.

— 1 Kings 2:31–33 (NIV)

The biblical refrain for those justly executed as due punishment for crimes is that "their blood will be on their own heads". This expresses the idea that those guilty of certain actions have brought the shedding of blood upon themselves, and those carrying out due punishment do not bear bloodguilt.

=== Justified killing: in warfare ===
The ancient Hebrew texts make a distinction between the moral and legal prohibition of shedding of innocent blood and killing in battle. Rabbi Marc Gellman explains the distinction between harag (killing) and ratzah (murder) and notes the different moral connotations: "there is wide moral agreement (not complete agreement) that some forms of killing are morally just, and killing an enemy combatant during wartime is one of them". For example, the Torah prohibits murder, but sanctions killing in legitimate battle. The Old Testament often praises the exploits of soldiers against enemies in battle. One of David's mighty men is credited with killing eight hundred men with the spear, and Abishai is credited with killing three hundred men.

The 613 mitzvot extend the notion of lawful killing to the nations that inhabited the Promised Land, commanding to exterminate them completely. Deuteronomy 20:10–18 establishes rules on killing civilians in warfare:

- the population of cities outside of the Promised Land, if they surrender, should be made tributaries and left alive (20:10–11)
- those cities outside of the Promised Land that resist should be besieged, and once they fall, the male population should be exterminated, but the women and children should be left alive (20:12–15)
- of those cities that were within the Promised Land, however, everybody was to be killed.

=== Justified killing: intruder in the home at night ===
As described in the Torah, the ancient understanding of the prohibition of murder made an exception for legitimate self-defense. A home defender who struck and killed a thief caught in the act of breaking in at night was not guilty of bloodshed. "If a thief is caught breaking in and is struck so that he dies, the defender is not guilty of bloodshed; but if it happens after sunrise, he is guilty of bloodshed."

A man's house is his castle, and God's law, as well as man's, sets a guard upon it; he that assaults it does so at his peril.

— M. Henry, 1706. Commentary on the Whole Bible, volume I (Genesis to Deuteronomy).

== Jewish doctrine ==
Rabbinic Judaism views the shedding of innocent blood very seriously, and lists murder as one of three sins (along with idolatry and sexual immorality) that fall under the category of yehareg ve'al ya'avor, meaning "One should let himself be killed rather than violate it." Jewish law enumerates 613 Mitzvot, or commandments, including prohibition of murder and a number of other commandments related to the preserving of human life and administration of justice in cases of shedding of innocent blood.

482. Don't commit murder (Exodus 20:13)
483. Don't accept ransom for life of the murderer (Numbers 35:31)
484. Exile an accidental murderer (Numbers 35:25)
485. Don't accept ransom from him (Numbers 35:32)
486. Don't kill the murderer before trying him (Numbers 35:12)
487. Save the pursued at the cost of the life of the pursuer (Deuteronomy 25:12)
488. Don't show pity for the pursuer (Numbers 35:12)
489. Don't stand idly by when you can save a life (Leviticus 19:16)
490. Set aside cities of refuge for those who commit accidental homicide (Deuteronomy 19:3)
491. Break the neck of the calf by the river (in ritual following unsolved murder) (Deuteronomy 21:4)
492. Don't till by that river or sow there (Deuteronomy 21:4)
493. Don't cause loss of human life (through negligence) (Deuteronomy 22:8)
494. Build a parapet (in roof of house) (Deuteronomy 22:8)
495. Don't mislead with advice which is a stumbling block (Leviticus 19:14)
496. Help a man remove the load from his beast which can no longer carry it (Exodus 23:5)
497. Help him load his beast (Deuteronomy 22:4)
498. Don't leave him in a state of confusion and go on your way (Deuteronomy 22:4)

— Maimonides, Sefer Hamitzvot

On the subject of manslaughter ("thou shalt not kill"), the rabbinic authority Nachmanides was one of the few who enumerated a negative commandment prohibiting this lesser offense.

Life is considered very precious, even sacred by Jewish teaching. The Talmud cites the prohibition of shedding innocent blood in Genesis 9:6 as the reason why the death penalty should be carried out against non-Jews as well as Jews, and while faithful Jews are required to obey 613 Mitzvot, gentiles are only obliged to obey the seven Noahide laws, which include the prohibition of murder and establishment of a justice system to administer law honestly. Rabbi Dr. Azriel Rosenfeld offers a representative modern summary of Jewish teaching regarding the command not to murder.

Chapter 68. Murderer and Protection of Life – Rotze'ach u-Shemiras Nefesh

It is forbidden to murder, as it says "You shall not murder" (Exodus 20:13, Deuteronomy 5:17).

A murderer must be put to death, as it says "He shall be avenged" (Exodus 21:20, see Leviticus 24:17,21); it is forbidden to accept compensation from him instead, as it says "You shall not take redemption for the life of a murderer...; and there shall be no atonement for the blood that was spilled... except the blood of him that spilled it" (Numbers 35:31–33). It is forbidden to execute a murderer before he has stood trial, as it says "And the murderer shall not die until he stands before the congregation for judgment" (Numbers 35:12). However, we are commanded to prevent an attempted murder by killing the would-be murderer if necessary, and it is forbidden to refrain from doing so, as it says "And you shall cut off her hand; you shall not be merciful" (Deuteronomy 25:12); and similarly for attempted fornication, as it says "[If the man seizes her and lies with her...] just as a man rises up against his friend and murders him, so is this thing"(Deuteronomy 22:26). It is forbidden to refrain from saving life when it is in one's power to do so, as it says "You shall not stand on your friend's blood"(Leviticus 19:16).

— Rabbi Dr. Azriel Rosenfeld

In the Talmud, Genesis 9:5 is interpreted as a prohibition against killing oneself, and Genesis 9:6 is "cited in support for the prohibition of abortion".

According to the Mishnah (older part of the Talmud), it is said of Hillel the Elder that he saw a skull that was floating on top of the water and he said (to it): "Since you drowned [others, others] drowned you. And in the end, those that drowned you will be drowned." From Rabbi Tarfon and Rabbi Akiva it is stated in the Mishnah: "If we were on the Sanhedrin, nobody would have ever been executed."

According to conservative rabbi Louis Ginzberg, every slain man who, because of murdering, died before their time shall stay in the outer part of Sheol until the course of the time predestined them is run.

== New Testament doctrine ==
The New Testament is in agreement that murder is a grave moral evil, and maintains the Old Testament view of bloodguilt. But Jesus himself expands upon the commandment, "Do not kill", by admonishing against any experience of anger against another being met by any action other than forgiveness. The New Testament depicts Jesus as explaining that murder, as well as other sins, comes from the heart.

For out of the heart come evil intentions, murder, adultery, sexual immorality, theft, false witness, slander.

— Matthew 15:19 (NRSVUE)

The New Testament acknowledges the just and proper role of civil government in maintaining justice and punishing evildoers, even to the point of "bearing the sword". One criminal on the cross contrasts his death as due punishment with Jesus' death as an innocent man. When Jesus appeared before Pilate, both Pilate and the crowd recognize the principles of bloodguilt.

The profession of soldier is used as a metaphor by Paul exhorting the Ephesians to "put on the full armor of God". Cornelius, the Roman centurion, is portrayed as a righteous and God-fearing man. Jesus praises the faith of a Roman centurion on the occasion of healing the centurion's servant, and states that he has not found such great faith even in Israel. When John the Baptist was preaching repentance and baptizing penitent sinners in the Jordan River, soldiers came to John and asked for specific instructions regarding their repentance. John did not demand that the soldiers renounce their profession, although they did not present themselves as having killed, but exhorted them to be content with their pay.

Soldiers also asked him, "And we, what should we do?" He said to them, "Do not extort money from anyone by threats or false accusation, and be satisfied with your wages."

— Luke 3:14 (NRSVUE)

Jesus was not condoning violence as the very next verse confirms it was to satisfy the prophecy of Isaiah 53 when he told his disciples to buy a sword if they do not have one, "now if you have a purse, take it, and also a bag; and if you don't have a sword, sell your cloak and buy one." Jesus was quick to correct Peter for the improper use of the sword in cutting off the ear of the high-priest's servant.

Then Jesus said to him, "Put your sword back into its place, for all who take the sword will die by the sword. Do you think that I cannot appeal to my Father, and he will at once send me more than twelve legions of angels?"

— Matthew 26:52–53 (NRSVUE)

== Catholic doctrine ==
This commandment demands respect for human life and is more accurately translated as "thou shalt not murder". Killing may, under limited circumstances, be justified within Catholicism. The basis of all Catholic teaching about the fifth commandment is the "sanctity of life", which is often contrasted with the "quality of life" to some extent. The Church is actively involved in the public debates over abortion, capital punishment and euthanasia, and encourages believers to support legislation and politicians it describes as pro-life.

With regard to this commandment the Roman Catechism (1566) states:

In its development our Lord himself points out its twofold obligation; the one forbidding to kill, the other commanding us to cherish sentiments of charity, concord, and friendship towards our enemies, to have peace with all men, and finally, to endure with patience every inconvenience which the unjust aggression of others may inflict.

=== Abortion ===
According to the Catechism of the Catholic Church (1992):

Human life is sacred because from its beginning it involves the creative action of God and it remains for ever in a special relationship with the Creator, who is its sole end. God alone is the Lord of life from its beginning until its end: no one can under any circumstance claim for himself the right directly to destroy an innocent human being ... The deliberate murder of an innocent person is gravely contrary to the dignity of the human being, to the golden rule, and to the holiness of the Creator. The law forbidding it is universally valid: it obliges each and everyone, always and everywhere ... The sixth commandment forbids direct and intentional killing as gravely sinful. The murderer and those who cooperate voluntarily in murder commit a sin that cries out to heaven for vengeance.

The Catechism states that abortion is a grave moral evil because the act takes an innocent human life: human life must be respected and protected absolutely from the moment of conception. From the first moment of his existence, "a human being must be recognized as having the rights of a person – among which is the inviolable right of every innocent being to life".

=== Capital punishment ===
Legitimate defense is depicted as justifiable, even if the defender deals his aggressor a lethal blow. However, a person should not use more force than necessary to repel an attack. The legitimate defense of persons and societies should not be considered as an exception to the prohibition of murdering the innocent: the preservation of innocent life is seen as the intended outcome. Injury or death to the aggressor is not the intended outcome, it is the unfortunate consequence of using necessary force to repel an imminent threat.

Legitimate defense can be not only a right but a grave duty for one who is responsible for the lives of others. The Catechism says: "The defense of the common good requires that an unjust aggressor be rendered unable to cause harm. For this reason, those who legitimately hold authority also have the right to use arms to repel aggressors against the civil community entrusted to their responsibility."

The Catechism teaches that legitimate public authority has the right and duty to punish criminals proportionally to the gravity of the offense to safeguard the public good. Nonlethal means are preferred, if these are sufficient to defend and protect people's safety. Recourse to the death penalty was not excluded in the past. In August 2018 the Congregation for the Doctrine of the Faith with the approval of Pope Francis changed paragraph 2267 of the Catechism of the Catholic Church and declared that the death penalty is always regarded as inadmissible. An Ohio prosecutor publicly declared that he disagrees with that, while Catholic US scholars drafted an appeal against the change and declared it "scandalous".

Recourse to the death penalty on the part of legitimate authority, following a fair trial, was long considered an appropriate response to the gravity of certain crimes and an acceptable, albeit extreme, means of safeguarding the common good.

Today, however, there is an increasing awareness that the dignity of the person is not lost even after the commission of very serious crimes. In addition, a new understanding has emerged of the significance of penal sanctions imposed by the state. Lastly, more effective systems of detention have been developed, which ensure the due protection of citizens but, at the same time, do not definitively deprive the guilty of the possibility of redemption.

In February 2016 Pope Francis called for the suspension of the death penalty for the duration of the Holy Year "because modern means existed to 'efficiently repress crime without definitively denying the person who committed it the possibility of rehabilitating themselves'".

=== Suicide, euthanasia, health, intoxication ===
Catholic teaching strictly prohibits euthanasia and suicide as violations of the commandment, "You shall not kill." The church views life and health as precious gifts from God, so adherents are encouraged to avoid excess of food, tobacco, alcohol, and medications. Endangering others with excess speed or drunkenness on the roadway incurs grave guilt. The use of drugs, except on strictly therapeutic grounds is a grave offense. Clandestine production and trafficking in drugs constitute "direct co-operation in evil."

=== War and self-defense ===
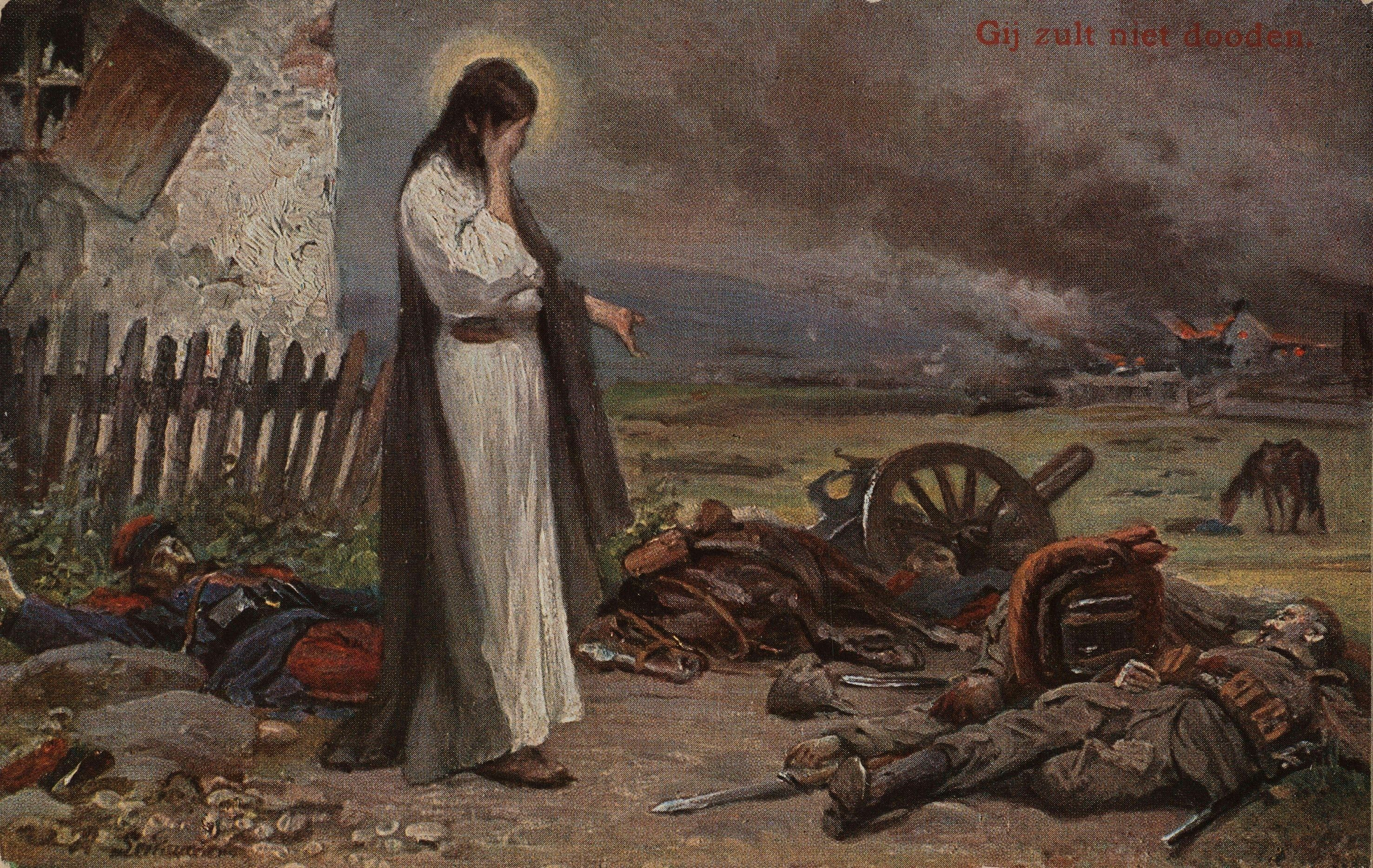
"Thou shall not kill", Jesus figure mourns on the battlefield, World War I

The Catholic Catechism urges prayer for the avoidance of war. All citizens and governments are obliged to work toward the avoidance of war. However, it recognizes that governments cannot be denied the lawful right to self-defense, once all peace efforts have failed. The use of legitimate defense by a military force is considered grave and therefore subject to rigorous considerations of moral legitimacy. Elements of just war theory are explicitly enumerated in the Catechism:

- the damage inflicted by the aggressor on the nation or community of nations must be lasting, grave, and certain;
- all other means of putting an end to it must have been shown to be impractical or ineffective;
- there must be serious prospects of success;
- the use of arms must not produce evils and disorders graver than the evil to be eliminated. The power of modern means of destruction weighs very heavily in evaluating this condition.

== Reformation and post-Reformation doctrines ==
=== Lutheranism ===
Martin Luther summarized the commandment against shedding innocent blood as grounded in the fear and love of God, and as having both positive and negative aspects: negative in that we must neither harm nor hurt our neighbor's body; positive in that we must help our neighbor and care for him when he is ill.

You must not murder. (Exodus 20:13)

Q. What does this mean?

A. We should fear and love God so that we may not hurt or harm our neighbor in his body, but help and befriend him in every bodily need [in every need and danger of life and body].

— Martin Luther, The Small Catechism

In his more detailed teaching, Luther explains that God and government are not constrained by the commandment not to kill, but that God has delegated his authority in punishing evildoers to the government. The prohibition of killing is forbidden to the individual in his relation to anyone else, and not to the government.

We have now completed both the spiritual and the temporal government, that is, the divine and the paternal authority and obedience. But here now we go forth from our house among our neighbors to learn how we should live with one another, every one himself toward his neighbor. Therefore God and government are not included in this commandment nor is the power to kill, which they have taken away. For God has delegated His authority to punish evil-doers to the government instead of parents, who aforetime (as we read in Moses) were required to bring their own children to judgment and sentence them to death. Therefore, what is here forbidden is forbidden to the individual in his relation to any one else, and not to the government.

— Martin Luther, Large Catechism

Today, the Lutheran Church of Australia recognises conscientious objection to war as biblically legitimate. It has declared, "The church ... accepts the validity of a person's refusal to engage in military service if he or she is convinced that participation in a military conflict amounts to the transgression of God's commandment 'You shall not kill'."

=== Calvinism ===
In The Institutes of the Christian Religion, John Calvin viewed the purport of this commandment as the safety of all being entrusted to each person. All violence and injustice, and every kind of harm from which our neighbor's body suffers is thereby prohibited. Christians are therefore required to faithfully perform that which is within their power to defend the life of their neighbor, be vigilant in warding off harm, and assist in removing danger when it comes. Calvin asserts that the same rule must also be applied in regulating the mind against anger, arguing that since God sees the heart and mind, the commandment against shedding innocent blood also prohibits murder of the heart and requires a sincere desire to preserve our brother's life. The hand does not commit the murder unless it is conceived by the mind under the influence of wrath and hatred. According to Calvin, where wrath and hatred dwell, there is an inclination to do mischief, quoting the Bible, "whosoever hateth his brother is a murderer" (1 John 3:15) and "whosoever is angry with his brother without a cause shall be in danger of the judgement" (Matthew 5:22).

Calvin also makes a case that the command against shedding blood is founded both in the creation of man in the image of God and in the need for a man to cherish his own flesh.

Scripture notes a twofold equity on which this commandment is founded. Man is both the image of God and our flesh. Wherefore, if we would not violate the image of God, we must hold the person of man sacred—if we would not divest ourselves of humanity we must cherish our own flesh. The practical inference to be drawn from the redemption and gift of Christ will be elsewhere considered. The Lord has been pleased to direct our attention to these two natural considerations as inducements to watch over our neighbour's preservation, viz., to revere the divine image impressed upon him, and embrace our own flesh. To be clear of the crime of murder, it is not enough to refrain from shedding man's blood. If in act you perpetrate, if in endeavour you plot, if in wish and design you conceive what is adverse to another's safety, you have the guilt of murder. On the other hand, if you do not according to your means and opportunity study to defend his safety, by that inhumanity you violate the law. But if the safety of the body is so carefully provided for, we may hence infer how much care and exertion is due to the safety of the soul, which is of immeasurably higher value in the sight of God.

— John Calvin

Matthew Henry considered the commandment against killing to apply to both one's own life as well as the life of one's neighbor and considered it to apply not only to causing of death but also to prohibit any thing unjustly hurtful to or injurious to the health, ease, and life of one's own body or the body of any other person. He also ties the commandment against bloodshed back to the command to Noah, and he sees it as a command applying to the individual against his neighbor, but not against killing in lawful war, for one's own necessary defense, or against the government instituting due punishments for criminal offenses. He portrays lying in wait for the blood of the innocent as a grave offense against human dignity as one of the fundamental laws of nature.

This is one of the laws of nature, and was strongly enforced by the precepts given to Noah and his sons, Gen. 9:5, 6. It does not forbid killing in lawful war, or in our own necessary defence, nor the magistrate's putting offenders to death, for those things tend to the preserving of life; but it forbids all malice and hatred to the person of any (for he that hateth his brother is a murderer), and all personal revenge arising therefrom; also all rash anger upon sudden provocations, and hurt said or done, or aimed to be done, in passion: of this our Saviour expounds this commandment, Mt. 5:22. And, as that which is worst of all, it forbids persecution, laying wait for the blood of the innocent and excellent ones of the earth.

— Matthew Henry

Many modern Calvinists, such as André Trocmé and Jacques Ellul, have been pacifists.

Today, the orthodox position of conservative Calvinists is Christian pacifism.

=== Anglicanism ===
Lambeth Conference 1930 Resolution 25 declares that "The Conference affirms that war as a method of settling international disputes is incompatible with the teaching and example of our Lord Jesus Christ." The 1948, 1958 and 1968 conferences re-ratified this position. The Anglican Pacifist Fellowship lobbies the various dioceses of the Anglican Communion to uphold this agreed position.

== See also ==
- Seven Laws of Noah
- Sin
