= Salt in the Bible =

The role of salt in the Bible is relevant to understanding Hebrew society during the Old Testament and New Testament periods. Salt is a necessity of life and was a mineral that was used since ancient times in many cultures as a seasoning, a preservative, a disinfectant, a component of ceremonial offerings, and as a unit of exchange. The Bible contains numerous references to salt. In various contexts, it is used metaphorically to signify permanence, loyalty, durability, fidelity, usefulness, value, and purification.

== Salt sources in Ancient Israel ==
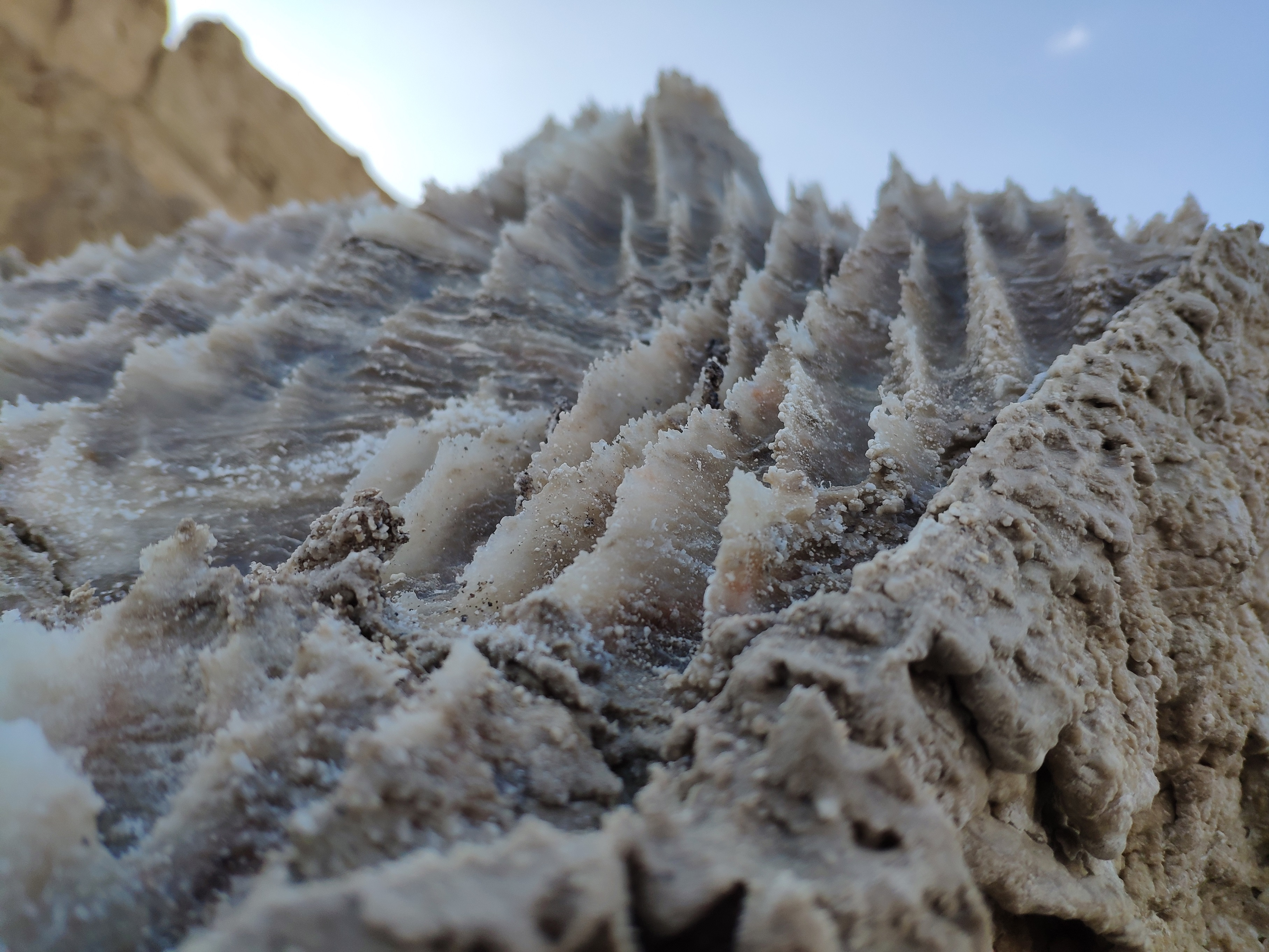
Rock salt at Jebel Usdum

The main source of salt in the region was the area of the Dead Sea, especially the massive salt cliffs of Jebel Usdum, about seven miles (11 km) long. The face of the ridge is constantly changing as weather interacts with the rock salt. Ezekiel 47:11 highlights the importance of the Dead Sea's salt.

The Hebrew people harvested salt by pouring sea water into pits and letting the water evaporate until only salt was left. They used the mineral for seasoning and as a preservative. In addition, salt was used to disinfect wounds. In 2 Chronicles 13:5 King Abijah referred to God's covenant promise to David that he will not lack a man to seat on Israel's throne as a salt covenant, a covenant that can never be broken.

== Hebrew Bible ==
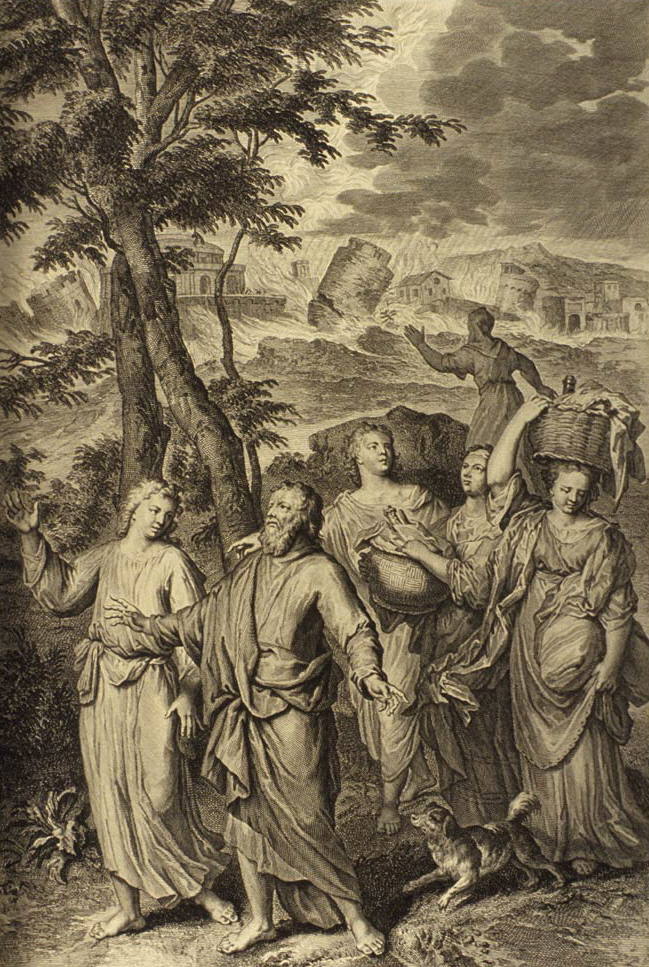
An angel leads Lot out of Sodom and destroys the city; as in Genesis 19:25-26

The fate of Lot's wife, being turned to a pillar of salt, is found in Genesis 19:26. This is the reason for the naming of the pillar on Mount Sodom, which is often called "Lot's Wife".

Leviticus 2:13 and Ezekiel 43:24 illustrate the requirement of salt as part of ancient Hebrew religious sacrifices. Leviticus 2:13 reads: "And every offering of your grain offering you shall season with salt; you shall not allow the salt of the covenant of your God to be lacking from your grain offering. With all your offerings you shall offer salt."

Salt was cast on the burnt offering (Ezekiel 43:24) and was part of the incense (Exodus 30:35). Part of the temple offering included salt (Ezra 6:9).

Salt was widely and variably used as a symbol and sacred sign in ancient Israel Numbers 18:19 and 2 Chronicles 13:5 illustrate salt as a covenant of friendship. In cultures throughout the region, the eating of salt is a sign of friendship. Salt land is a metaphorical name for a desolate no man's land, as attested in Psalms 107:34, Job 39:6, and Jeremiah 17:6. The land of defeated cities was salted to consecrate them to a god and curse their re-population, as illustrated in Judges 9:45.

Newborn babies were rubbed with salt. A reference to this practice is in Ezekiel 16:4: "As for your nativity, on the day you were born your navel cord was not cut, nor were you washed in water to cleanse you; you were not rubbed with salt nor wrapped in swaddling cloths."

== New Testament ==
The Salt and Light passages in the Sermon on the Mount make reference to salt. The Gospel of Matthew's differs slightly from that of the Gospel of Luke and the Gospel of Mark. Matthew 5:13 refers to Jesus' disciples as "the salt of the earth." This meaning is paralleled in the following verse, Matthew 5:14, in the symbolism of the "light of the world." Another view is that the Salt and Light passages refer to a duality of roles in the disciples to be like a light from a city, viewable from all over the world, and to be spread out as salt is: to congregate and spread. Matthew, Mark, and Luke accord in the discussion of salt "that has lost its taste." This may be a symbolic reference to the possibility of abandoning or deviating from the gospel, especially due to the adulteration of its teachings. Another interpretation is that in a world filled with sin and deceit, it is possible for one to become contaminated and thus unsuccessful at being an effective disciple. Therefore, this verse serves as a warning for disciples to be on their guard; to be in the world, but not of the world.

Mark 9:49 speaks about the salting of the condemned, which is a rhetorical device indicating the severity of the punishment. Mark 9:50 reads in part: "Have salt in yourselves, and have peace with one another." The salt in this verse refers to the goodwill that "seasons" positive relationships between people. This is also a play on the covenant of salt, indicating friendship and compassion. Colossians 4:6 uses the metaphor of salt seasoning speech to indicate speaking with intelligence and consideration.

== See also ==
- Covenant of salt
- Salt and light

== Bibliography ==
- McKenzie, John L. Dictionary of the Bible. Simon and Schuster, 1995. ISBN 0-684-81913-9.
