= Salt and light =

Metaphor used by Jesus in the Sermon on the Mount

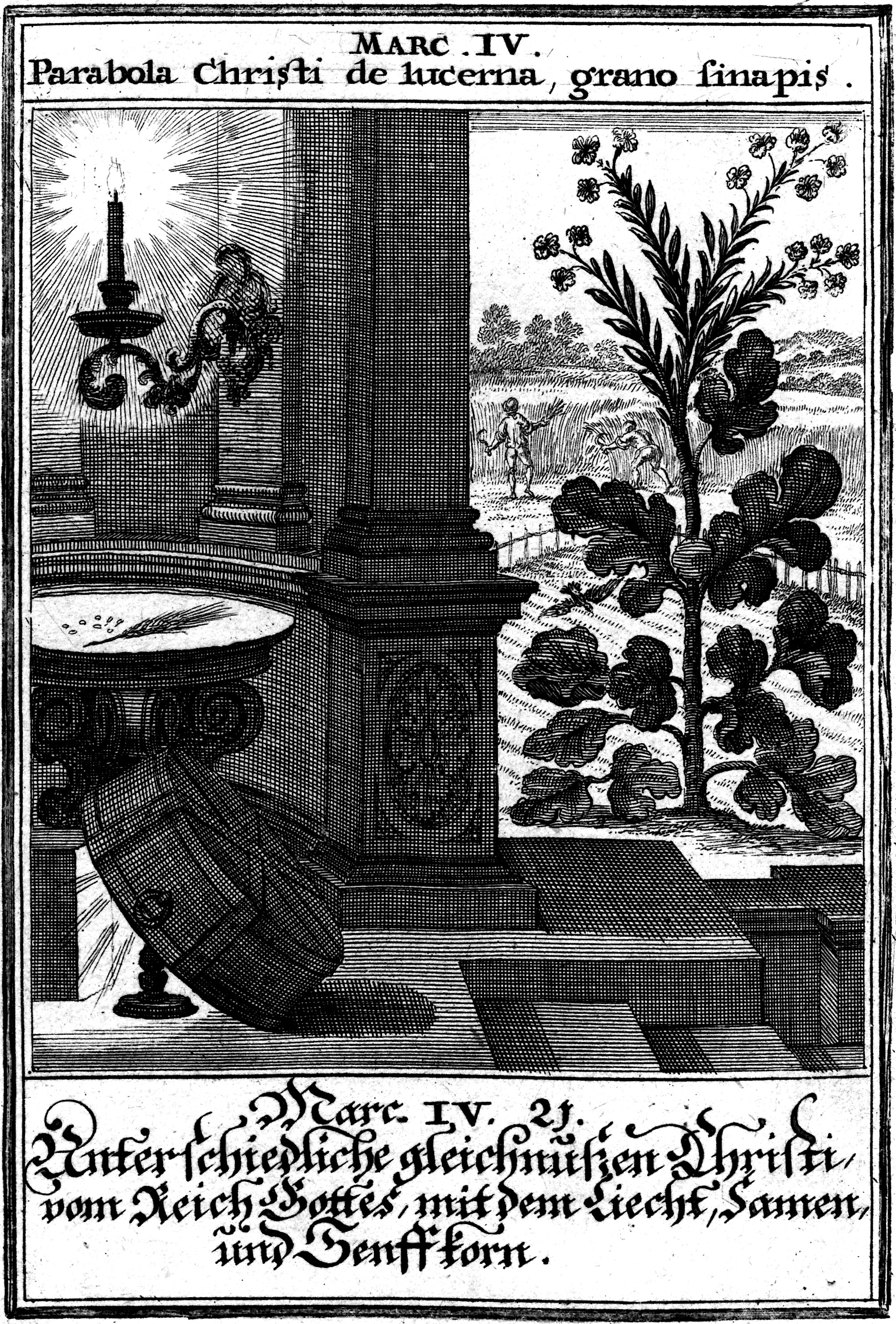
An illustration of the light parable

Salt and light are images used by Jesus in the Sermon on the Mount, one of the main teachings of Jesus on morality and discipleship. These images are in Matthew 5:13, 14, 15 and 16.

The general theme of Matthew 5:13–16 is promises and expectations, and these expectations follow the promises of the first part.

The first verse of this passage introduces the phrase "salt of the earth" (Ancient Greek: τὸ ἅλας τῆς γῆς, romanized: tò hálas tês gês):

You are the salt of the earth, but if the salt has lost its flavor, with what will it be salted? It is then good for nothing, but to be cast out and trodden under the feet of men.

— Matthew 5:13 (World English Bible)

The second verse introduces "City upon a Hill" (Greek: πόλις [...] ἐπάνω ὄρους κειμένη, romanized: polis [...] epánō órous keiménē):

You are the light of the world. A city located on a hill can't be hidden.

— Matthew 5:14 (World English Bible)

The later verses refer to not hiding a lamp under a bushel, which also occurs in Luke 8:16–18, and the phrase "Light of the World", which also appears in John 8:12.

Neither do you light a lamp, and put it under a measuring basket, but on a stand; and it shines to all who are in the house. Even so, let your light shine before men; that they may see your good works, and glorify your Father who is in heaven.

— Matthew 5:15–16 (World English Bible)

== See also ==
- Five Discourses of Matthew
- Matthew 5:13
- Salt in the Bible
- Salt of the earth
