= Matthew 5:13 =

- ← 5:12 5:14 →
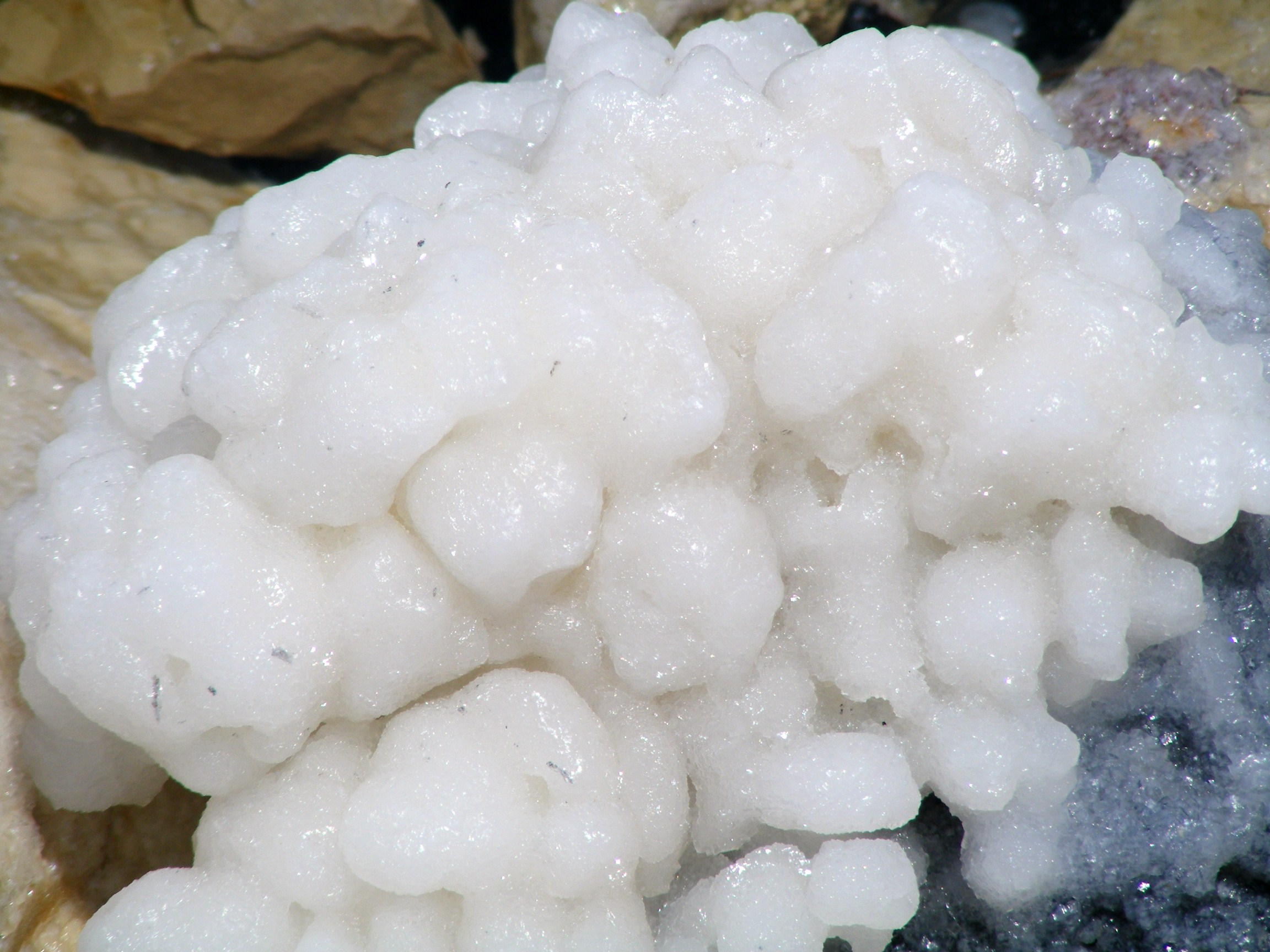
- Salt from the Dead Sea
- Book: Gospel of Matthew
- Christian Bible part: New Testament

Matthew 5:13 is the thirteenth verse of the fifth chapter of the Gospel of Matthew in the New Testament. It is part of the Sermon on the Mount, the first of a series of metaphors immediately following the Beatitudes.

== Content ==
The text in Koine Greek is:

Ὑμεῖς ἐστε τὸ ἅλας τῆς γῆς· ἐὰν δὲ τὸ ἅλας μωρανθῇ,
ἐν τίνι ἁλισθήσεται; εἰς οὐδὲν ἰσχύει ἔτι εἰ
μὴ βληθὲν ἔξω καταπατεῖσθαι ὑπὸ τῶν ἀνθρώπων.

— Matthew 5:13, SBL Greek New Testament

There is a variant reading in the Textus Receptus, which reads:

βληθηναι εξω και καταπατεισθαι …

— Matthew 5:13, 1550 Stephanus New Testament

The translation of the King James Bible reads:

Ye are the salt of the earth: but if the salt have lost his
savour, wherewith shall it be salted? it is thenceforth good
for nothing, but to be cast out, and to be trodden under foot of men.

— Matthew 5:13, KJV

The World English Bible translates the passage as:

You are the salt of the earth, but if the salt has lost its
flavor, with what will it be salted? It is then good for nothing,
but to be cast out and trodden under the feet of men.

— Matthew 5:13, WEB

== Parallels ==
The verse is paralleled in Mark 9:50; Luke 14:34–35 also has a version of this text similar to the one in Mark.

There are a wide number of references to salt in the Old Testament. Leviticus 2:13, Numbers 18:19, and 2 Chronicles 13:5 all present salt as a sign of God's covenant. Exodus 30:35, Ezekiel 16:4 and 43:24, and 2 Kings 2:21 all present salt as a purifying agent.

== Salt as a metaphor ==
The exact meaning of the expression is disputed, in part because salt had a wide number of uses in the ancient world.

Salt was extremely important in the time period when Matthew was written, and ancient communities knew that salt was a requirement of life. It was most used as a preservative; this use was important enough that salt was sometimes even used as currency, from which the word salary originates. The most common interpretation of this verse is a reference to salt as a preservative, and to thus see the duty of the disciples as preserving the purity of the world.

Many fertilizers use salts in appropriate quantities. Robert H. Gundry and others note that salt was a minor but essential ingredient in fertilizer, and Gundry suggests that earth (τῆς γῆς, tēs gēs) should be translated as soil, and the disciples are thus to help the world grow and prosper. Many scholars disagree with Gundry's translation of earth as soil: most see it as referring to the world and in Eduard Schweizer's words "the totality of mankind," even though the more common word used for this purpose is anthrópos and that gé is used extensively as "land" or as physical earth. George Shillington feels that the Greek word for salt here refers to the chemical agent used in ancient times to fertilize fields rather than the edible salt used to preserve meat or flavor foods, indicating that the disciples are to bring new life to the world. Alan Kreider expounds upon this idea and notes various sources which led him to share this interpretation. Willard Swartley states that by obeying the Golden Rule one becomes the fertilizing salt of the earth. Phil Schmidt also believes that the disciples are meant to stimulate growth and positively affect the world.

Schweizer notes that a common Jewish expression at the time was to call the Laws the "salt and the light" of the world, which may mean this section is an introduction to the discussion of Mosaic law that will soon commence. In the Rabbinic literature of the period salt was a metaphor for wisdom.

Salt also played role in ritual purity and all sacrifices had to contain salt. John Nolland argues that the many different uses of salt show its importance in the life of the period, and it is this importance of the disciples that is being referenced.

Ancient peoples sometimes put salt on the wicks of lamps to increase their brightness.

== Losing saltiness ==
The issue of salt losing its flavour is somewhat problematic. Salt itself, sodium chloride (NaCl), is extremely stable and cannot lose its flavour. France notes that Jesus was giving a lesson in moral philosophy and "not teaching chemistry"; to him, whether or not the proverbial image is factually accurate is of little relevance to the actual message of this verse. Nolland considers the impossibility of what is described as deliberate, it is counter to nature that salt lose its flavour, just as it is counter to God's will that the disciples lose faith.

The most common explanation for this is that what would have been called salt in that era was quite impure, containing a wide array of other compounds. Of the substances in this mix the NaCl was the most soluble in water and if exposed to moisture the NaCl would disappear leaving a white powder looking just like salt, but not having its flavour or its preservative abilities. The salt used in the area mostly came from mines around the Dead Sea and material extracted from that area demonstrates these same properties today. Gundry notes that some other explanations have been advanced. Salt was extremely valuable and unscrupulous merchants may have replaced the salt with other substances. For some purposes gypsum was added to salt, but this would erase its flavour and make it unfit for consumption.

Albert Barnes, in his Notes on the Bible (1834) says:

In eastern countries, however, the salt used was impure, or mingled with vegetable or earthy substances, so that it might lose the whole of its saltiness, and a considerable quantity of earthy matter remain. This was good for nothing, except that it was used to place in paths, or walks, as we use gravel. This kind of salt is common still in that country. It is found in the earth in veins or layers, and when exposed to the sun and rain, loses its saltiness entirely. Maundrell says, "I broke a piece of it, of which that part that was exposed to the rain, sun, and air, though it had the sparks and particles of salt, yet it had perfectly lost its savour. The inner part, which was connected to the rock, retained its savour, as I found by proof."

Additionally, William McClure Thomson in the nineteenth century says:

I have often seen just such salt, and the identical disposition of it that our Lord has mentioned. A merchant of Sidon having farmed of the government the revenue from the importation of salt, brought over an immense quantity from the marshes of Cyprus – enough, in fact, to supply the whole province for at least 20 years. This he had transferred to the mountains, to cheat the government out of some small percentage. Sixty-five houses in June – Lady Stanhope's village were rented and filled with salt. These houses have merely earthen floors, and the salt next the ground, in a few years, entirely spoiled. I saw large quantities of it literally thrown into the street, to be trodden underfoot by people and beasts. It was 'good for nothing.'

— The Land & the Book, vol. ii. pp. 43, 44

However, Anglican Bishop Charles Ellicott referred to Henry Maundrell's observation from the latter's travels, around 1690, and noted that Maundrell said he "found lumps of rock-salt there which had become partially flavourless", adding that he was "not aware that this has been confirmed by recent travelers".

Schweizer notes that some early versions have this verse read "earth lose its salt" rather than "salt lose its flavour" and is thus an illustration of how important the disciples are to the world. Hill notes that there is an entirely different understanding, which is that Jesus was well aware that salt cannot lose its flavour and the message is that if the disciples remain true to their Christianity they will never lose their influence and importance.

== Foolishness ==
The literal translation of the Greek μωρανθῇ, mōranthē, "loses its savour", is "becomes foolish". In Aramaic the same term is used for losing savour and becoming foolish. Some have speculated that "became foolish" is thus a mistranslation by someone who did not realize the dual meaning of the Aramaic. Gundry feels that the idea of foolish salt is such "utter nonsense" that no translator would ever make such a mistake; he feels it is more likely that the Semitic expression had been assimilated into Greek and that became foolish was an expression for losing savour. English language translators universally accept that the verse is talking about flavour rather than intelligence. Some scholars do feel that this may be wordplay related to the Rabbinic use of salt as a metaphor for intelligence.

== Trodden under foot ==
Gundry notes that at the time garbage would have been disposed of by throwing it out into the street. This explains why once the salt is cast out it will be trodden under foot of men.

== In culture ==
Matthew 5:13 is a very well-known verse; "salt of the earth" has become a common English expression. Clarke notes that the phrase first appeared in the Tyndale New Testament of 1525. The modern usage of the phrase is somewhat separate from its scriptural origins. Today it refers to someone who is humble and lacking pretension. Due to its fame it has occurred a number of times in art and popular culture, but as Siebald notes usually these are based on the secular understanding of the term. It has been the title of an important 1954 film, a John Godber play, a song on The Rolling Stones' Beggars Banquet, and a non-fiction work by Uys Krige. Both Algernon Swinburne and D.H. Lawrence wrote poems by this name. In Middle English literature the expression had a different meaning somewhat closer to the scripture, mostly being used to refer to the clergy. This usage is found both in Chaucer's "The Summoner's Tale" and Piers Plowman.

Along with Matthew 5:14, this verse became the theme of World Youth Day 2002: "You are the salt of the earth [...] you are the light of the world".

== Commentary from the Church Fathers ==
Chrysostom:

When He had delivered to His Apostles such sublime precepts, so much greater than the precepts of the Law, that they might not be dismayed and say, How shall we be able to fulfil these things? He sooths their fears by mingling praises with His instructions, saying, Ye are the salt of the earth. This shows them how necessary were these precepts for them. Not for your own salvation merely, or for a single nation, but for the whole world is this doctrine committed to you. It is not for you then to flatter and deal smoothly with men, but, on the contrary, to be rough and biting as salt is. When for thus offending men by reproving them ye are reviled, rejoice; for this is the proper effect of salt to be harsh and grating to the depraved palate. Thus the evil-speaking of others will bring you no inconvenience, but will rather be a testimony of your firmness.

— Chrysostom

Hilary of Poitiers:

There may be here seen a propriety in our Lord's language which may be gathered by considering the Apostles' office, and the nature of salt. This, used as it is by men for almost every purpose, preserves from decay those bodies which are sprinkled with it; and in this, as well as in every sense of its flavour as a condiment, the parallel is most exact. The Apostles are preachers of heavenly things, and thus, as it were, salters with eternity; rightly called the salt of the earth, as by the virtue of their teaching, they, as it were, salt and preserve bodies for eternity.

— Hilary of Poitiers

Saint Remigius:

Moreover, salt is changed into another kind of substance by three means, water, the heat of the sun, and the breath of the wind. Thus Apostolical men also were changed into spiritual regeneration by the water of baptism, the heat of love, and the breath of the Holy Spirit. That heavenly wisdom also, which the Apostles preached, dries up the humours of carnal works, removes the foulness and putrefaction of evil conversation, kills the work of lustful thoughts, and also that worm of which it is said their worm dieth not. (Is. 66:24.)

— Saint Remigius

Saint Remigius:

The Apostles are the salt of the earth, that is, of worldly men who are called the earth, because they love this earth.

— Saint Remigius

Jerome:

Or, because by the Apostles the whole human race is seasoned.

— Jerome

Pseudo-Chrysostom:

A doctor when he is adorned with all the preceding virtues, then is like good salt, and his whole people are salted by seeing and hearing him.

— Pseudo-Chrysostom

Saint Remigius:

It should be known, that in the Old Testament no sacrifice was offered to God unless it were first sprinkled with salt, for none can present an acceptable sacrifice to God without the flavour of heavenly wisdom.

— Saint Remigius

Hilary of Poitiers:

And because man is ever liable to change, He therefore warns the Apostles, who have been entitled the salt of the earth, to continue stedfast in the might of the power committed to them, when He adds, If the salt have lost its savour, wherewith shall it be salted?

— Hilary of Poitiers

Jerome:

That is, if the doctor have erred, by what other doctor shall he be corrected?

— Jerome

Augustine:

If you by whom the nations are to be salted shall lose the kingdom of heaven through fear of temporal persecution, who are they by whom your error shall be corrected. Another copy has, If the salt have lost all sense, showing that they must be esteemed to have lost their sense, who cither pursuing abundance, or fearing lack of temporal goods, lose those which are eternal, and which men can neither give nor take away.

— Augustine

Hilary of Poitiers:

But if the doctors having become senseless, and having lost all the savour they once enjoyed, are unable to restore soundness to things corrupt, they are become useless; and are thenceforth fit only to be cast out and trodden by men.

— Hilary of Poitiers

Jerome:

The illustration is taken from husbandry. Salt, though it be necessary for seasoning of meats and preserving flesh, has no further use. Indeed we read in Scripture of vanquished cities sown with salt by the victors, that nothing should thenceforth grow there.

— Jerome

Glossa Ordinaria:

When then they who are the heads have fallen away, they are fit for no use but to be cast out from the office of teacher.

— Glossa Ordinaria

Hilary of Poitiers:

Or even cast out from the Church's store rooms to be trodden under foot by those that walk.

— Hilary of Poitiers

Augustine:

Not he that suffers persecution is trodden under foot of men, but he who through fear of persecution falls away. For we can tread only on what is below us; but he is no way below us, who however much he may suffer in the body, yet has his heart fixed in heaven.

— Augustine

== See also ==
- Salt in the Bible
- Salt of the earth

Preceded by Matthew 5:12	Gospel of Matthew; Chapter 5	Succeeded by Matthew 5:14
