= Light of the World =

Phrase used by Jesus to describe himself and his disciples

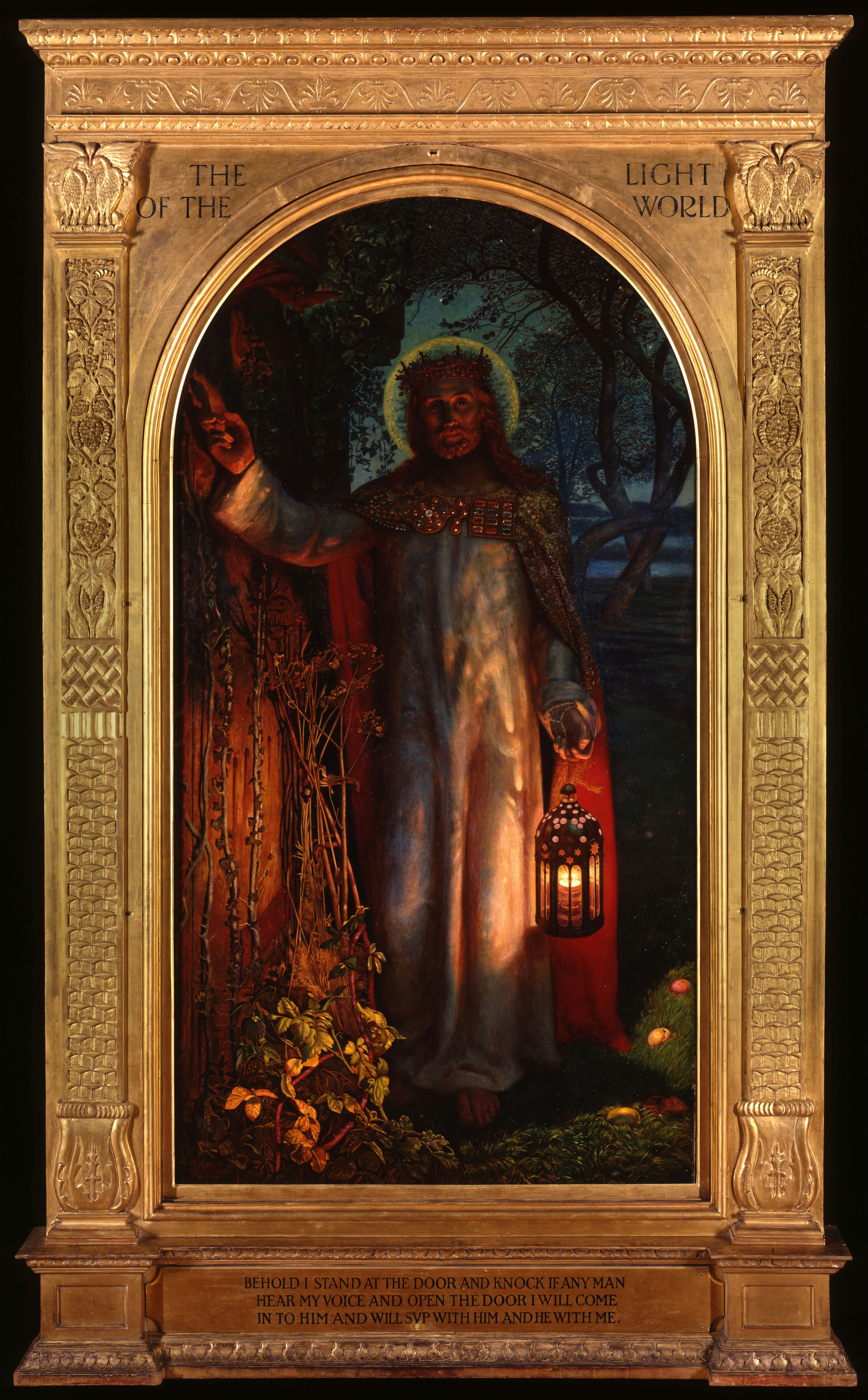
The Light of the World, by Holman Hunt 1851, in St Paul's Cathedral

"Light of the World" (Greek: φώς τοῦ κόσμου Phṓs tou kósmou) is a phrase used by Jesus to describe himself and his disciples in the New Testament. The phrase is recorded in the Gospels of Matthew (5:14–16) and John (John 8:12). It is closely related to the parables of salt and light and lamp under a bushel, which also appear in Jesus' Sermon on the Mount.

== Gospel accounts ==
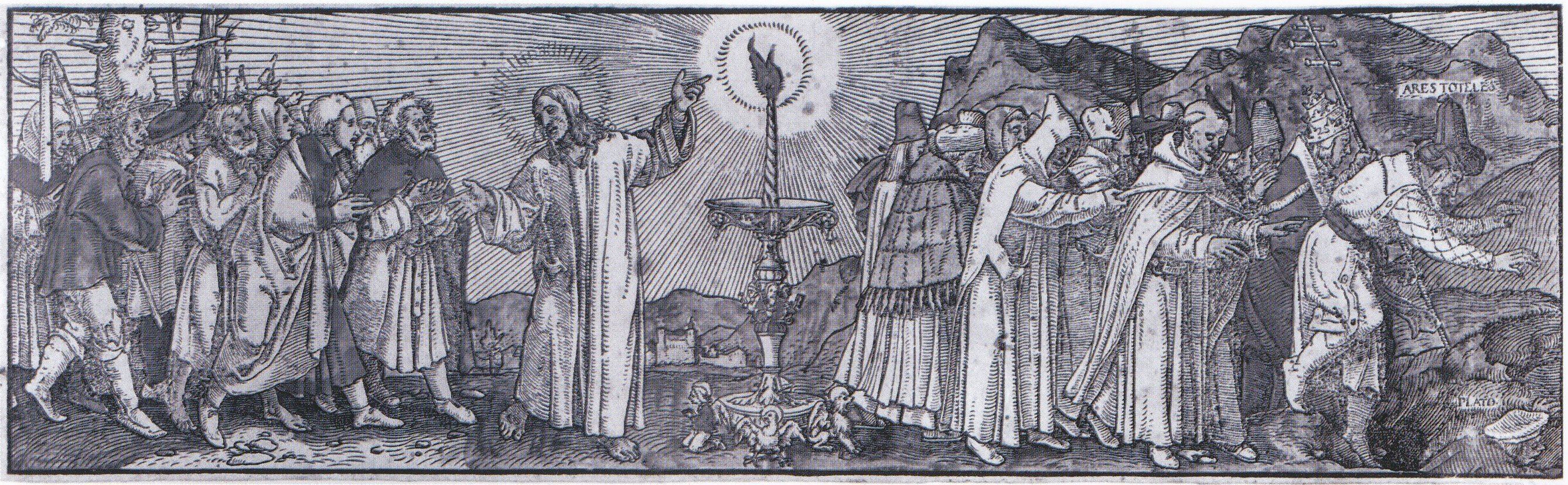
Christ as the True Light by Hans Holbein the Younger, c. 1526

=== Referring to himself ===
In John 8:12 Jesus applies the title to himself while debating with the Jews and states:

I am the light of the world. Whoever follows me will never walk in darkness, but will have the light of life.

Jesus again claims to be the Light of the World in John 9:5, during the miracle of healing the blind at birth, saying:

When I am in the world, I am the Light of the World.

This episode leads into John 9:39 where Jesus metaphorically explains that he came to this world, so that the blind may see.

In the Christological context, the use of the title Light of the World is similar to the Bread of Life title in John 6:35 where Jesus states: "I am the bread of life: he who comes to me shall not hunger." These assertions build on the Christological theme of John 5:26 where Jesus claims to possess life just as the Father does and provide it to those who follow him. The term "Life of the World" is applied in the same sense by Jesus to himself in John 6:51.

Light is defined as life, as seen in John 1:4, "In him was life; and the life was the light of men". Those who have faith in him will have eternal life. In John's Gospel, "darkness is present in the absence of light; the absence of eternal life," and darkness refers to death, spiritually.

=== Referring to his disciples ===
Jesus also used that term to refer to his disciples in Matthew 5:14:

You are the light of the world. A city on a hill cannot be hidden. Neither do people light a lamp and put it under a bowl. Instead, they put it on its stand, and it gives light to everyone in the house. In the same way, let your light shine before men, that they may see your good deeds and praise your Father in heaven.

This application of "light compared with darkness" also appears in 1 John 1:5 which applies it to God and states: "God is light, and in him is no darkness at all".

== Johannine dualism ==
Light and darkness in John's Gospel is an antithesis that has symbolic meaning and is essential to understanding the author of John. The fourth gospel expresses certain ideas using the antithesis more frequently than any other writings in the New Testament. Trocme suggests that the Johannine community may have borrowed the symbolic use of the antithesis Light–Darkness from Essene literature, "which considered History as a permanent conflict between Good and Evil, using Light as a symbol of Truth and Righteousness and Darkness as that of Falsehood and Evil", though there has been increasing skepticism of the existence Johannine community in 21st century scholarship.

Examples of dualistic concepts in the Gospel of John:

Light	Darkness
Known	Unknown
Jesus Christ	Satan
Heavenly	Earthly
Above	Below
Spirit	Flesh
Sight	Blindness
Universe	World
Day	Night

== Extra-biblical sources ==
In the extra-canonical Gospel of Thomas, a similar phrase appears, "There is light within a man of light, and he lights up the whole world. If he does not shine, he is darkness".

Light is a recurring theme in Gnostic religions such as Manichaeism and Mandaeism.

== See also ==
- Divine light – Aspect of divine presence
- I am (biblical term)
- Inward light – Quaker religious concept
- Jesus in Christianity
- Light of Christ
- Life of Jesus in the New Testament
- Tabor Light – Palamist doctrine of seeing God's light
