= Matthew 5:15–16 =

- ← 5:14 5:17 →
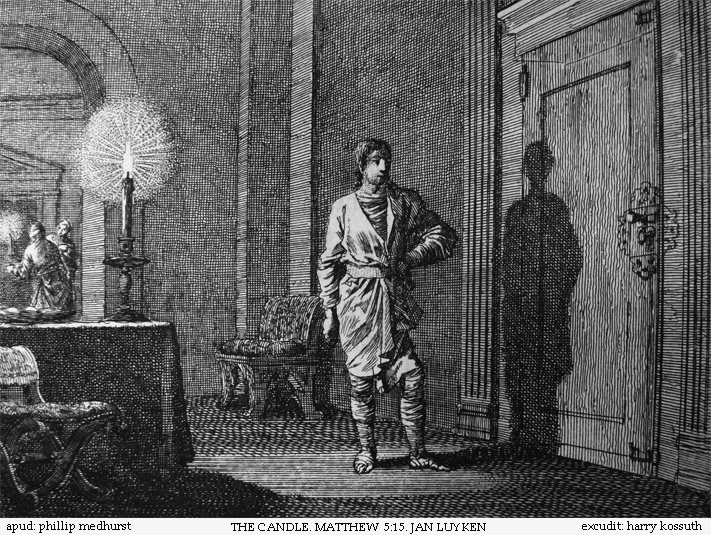
- An etching by Jan Luyken illustrating Matthew 5:15 in the Bowyer Bible (1795), Bolton, England.
- Book: Gospel of Matthew
- Christian Bible part: New Testament

Matthew 5:15 and Matthew 5:16 are the fifteenth and sixteenth verses of the fifth chapter of the Gospel of Matthew in the New Testament. They are part of the Sermon on the Mount, and form one of a series of metaphors often seen as adding to the Beatitudes. Verse 14 compared the disciples to a city upon a hill which cannot be hidden. These verses present a similar analogy.

== Content ==
In the King James Version of the Bible (KJV), the text reads:

15: Neither do men light a candle, and put it
under a bushel, but on a candlestick; and it
giveth light unto all that are in the house.
16: Let your light shine before men, that
they may see your good works, and
glorify your Father which is in heaven.

The World English Bible translates the passage as:

15: Neither do you light a lamp, and put it
under a measuring basket, but on a stand;
and it shines to all who are in the house.
16: Even so, let your light shine before men;
that they may see your good works, and
glorify your Father who is in heaven.

The Novum Testamentum Graece text is:

15:οὐδὲ καίουσιν λύχνον καὶ τιθέασιν αὐτὸν
ὑπὸ τὸν μόδιον, ἀλλ’ ἐπὶ τὴν λυχνίαν,
καὶ λάμπει πᾶσιν τοῖς ἐν τῇ οἰκίᾳ.
16:οὕτως λαμψάτω τὸ φῶς ὑμῶν ἔμπροσθεν τῶν ἀνθρώπων,
ὅπως ἴδωσιν ὑμῶν τὰ καλὰ ἔργα
καὶ δοξάσωσιν τὸν πατέρα ὑμῶν τὸν ἐν τοῖς οὐρανοῖς.

For a collection of other versions see BibleGateway Matthew 5:15-16.

== Analysis ==
The KJV translation of bushel is more literal. A bushel was a measure of grain equivalent to about nine litres. One cannot put a unit of measure on top of something, so the word is generally seen as an expression for a bowl or container holding this amount. The WEB uses this more figurative translation. David Hill in the New Century Bible Commentary notes that this might be a reference to the hiding of the Hanukkah lamp to protect it from desecration. Eduard Schweizer notes that at this time almost all houses would have only had one room, so a single lamp is all that would have been needed to shine on all inhabitants.

R. T. France notes that as with Matthew 5:13, the science in verse 15 is somewhat shaky. He notes that a lamp could not be hidden under a bowl as it would be rapidly extinguished by the lack of oxygen. Schweizer disagrees with this view. He feels that the metaphor is on how one would not light a lamp simply to put it out. He feels that a bowl would be a standard device to extinguish a lamp without generating smoke.

This verse is paralleled in Mark 4:21 and Luke 8:16. Hill notes that there is an important difference between Luke's and Matthew's versions. In Matthew the lamp shines on all who are in the house, implying conversion from within the community, Luke has the lamp shining for those who come into the house, implying new people joining the community.

St. Augustine linked this verse to John 5:35, and the two have been closely associated ever since, despite the somewhat different meanings of the two verses.

Hill notes that "Father in heaven" is a favourite expression of the author of Matthew's gospel, occurring twenty times. It could be a version of the common Old Testament phrase God of Israel, but with Israel replaced with heaven to show the wider application of the new message. Schweizer notes that the light is intended to shine towards people in general, also emphasizing the universal mission.

== Commentary from the Church Fathers ==
Pseudo-Chrysostom: The lamp is the Divine word, of which it is said, Thy word is a lamp unto my feet. (Psalm 119:105.) They who light this lamp are the Father, the Son, and the Holy Spirit.

Ambrose: And therefore let none shut up his faith within the measure of the Law, but have recourse to the Church in which the grace of the sevenfold Spirit shines forth.

Bede: Or, Christ Himself has lighted this lamp, when He filled the earthen vessel of human nature with the fire of His Divinity, which He would not either hide from them that believe, nor put under a bushel that is shut up under the measure of the Law, or confine within the limits of any one oration. The lampstand is the Church, on which He set the lamp, when He affixed to our foreheads the faith of His incarnation.

Hilary of Poitiers: Or, the lamp, i. e. Christ Himself, is set on its stand when He was suspended on the Cross in His passion, to give light forever to those that dwell in the Church; to give light, He says, to all that are in the house.

Augustine: For it is not absurd if any one will understand the house to be the Church. Or, the house may be the world itself, according to what He said above, Ye are the light of the world.

Hilary of Poitiers: He instructs the Apostles to shine with such a light, that in the admiration of their work God may be praised, Let your light so shine before men, that they may see your good works.

Pseudo-Chrysostom: That is, teaching with so pure a light, that men may not only hear your words, but see your works, that those whom as lamps ye have enlightened by the word, as salt ye may season by your example. For by those teachers who do as well as teach, God is magnified; for the discipline of the master is seen in the behaviour of the family. And therefore it follows, and they shall glorify your Father which is in heaven.

Augustine: Had He only said, That they may see your good works, He would have seemed to have set up as an end to be sought the praises of men, which the hypocrites desire; but by adding, and glorify your Father, he teaches that we should not seek as an end to please men with our good works, but referring all to the glory of God, therefore seek to please men, that in that God may be glorified.

Hilary of Poitiers: He means not that we should seek glory of men, but that though we conceal it, our work may shine forth in honour of God to those among whom we live.

== Later usage ==
Howard Clarke notes that these verses, like the previous two verses, have appeared prominently in history and culture. Charlemagne cited it as the reason for building a series of schools and universities across his empire. Verse 16 inspired the popular Victorian era hymn "Jesus Bids us Shine" and the still popular song "This Little Light of Mine". The verse also appears in several major works of literature including James Fenimore Cooper's The Pioneers and Thomas Hardy's Far from the Madding Crowd. In James Joyce's A Portrait of the Artist as a Young Man, a character is described as "shining quietly under a bushel of Wicklow bran".

== See also ==
- Lamp under a bushel

Preceded by Matthew 5:14	Gospel of Matthew; Chapter 5	Succeeded by Matthew 5:17
