= Salt =

Mineral composed of sodium chloride

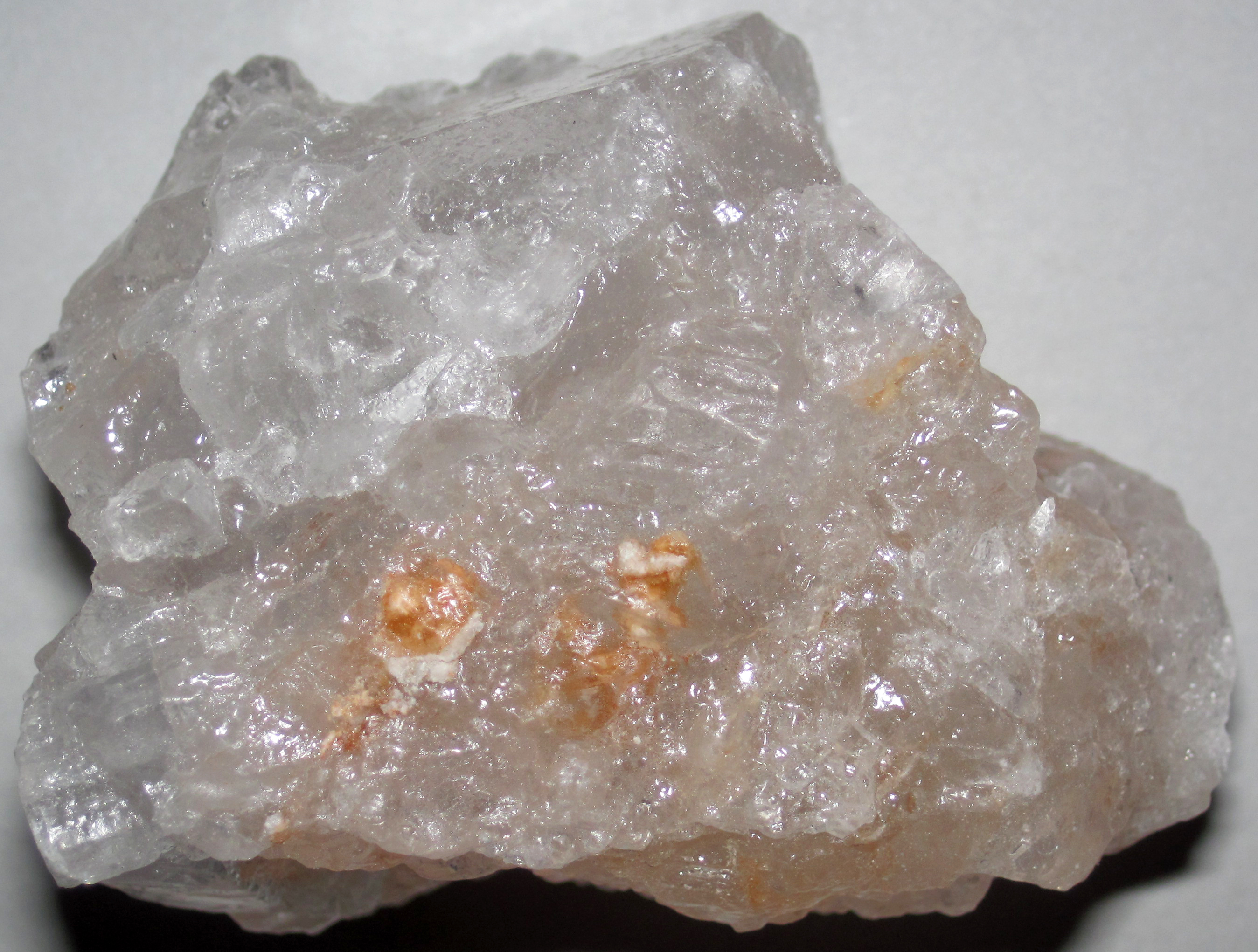
Rock salt (halite)

Salt is a mineral composed primarily of sodium chloride (NaCl). When used in food, especially in granulated form, it is more formally called table salt. In the form of a natural crystalline mineral, salt is also known as rock salt or halite. Salt is essential for life in general (being the source of the essential dietary minerals sodium and chlorine), and saltiness is one of the basic human tastes. Salt is one of the oldest and most ubiquitous food seasonings, and is known to uniformly improve the taste perception of food. Salting, brining, and pickling are ancient and important methods of food preservation.

Some of the earliest evidence of salt processing dates to around 6000 BC, when people living in the area of present-day Romania boiled spring water to extract salts; a salt works in China dates to approximately the same period. Salt was prized by the ancient Hebrews, Greeks, Romans, Byzantines, Hittites, Egyptians, and Indians. Salt became an important article of trade and was transported by boat across the Mediterranean Sea, along specially built salt roads, and across the Sahara on camel caravans. The scarcity and universal need for salt have led nations to go to war over it and use it to raise tax revenues, for instance triggering the El Paso Salt War which took place in El Paso in the late 1860s. Salt is used in religious ceremonies and has other cultural and traditional significance.

Salt is processed from salt mines, and by the evaporation of seawater (sea salt) and mineral-rich spring water in shallow pools. The greatest single use for salt (sodium chloride) is as a feedstock for the production of chemicals. It is used to produce caustic soda and chlorine, and in the manufacture of products such as polyvinyl chloride, plastics, and paper pulp. Of the annual global production of around three hundred million tonnes, only a small percentage is used for human consumption. Other uses include water conditioning processes, de-icing highways, and agricultural use. Edible salt is sold in forms such as sea salt and table salt. Table salt usually contains an anti-caking agent and may be iodised to prevent iodine deficiency. As well as its use in cooking and at the table, salt is present in many processed foods.

Sodium is an essential element for human health via its role as an electrolyte and osmotic solute. However, excessive salt consumption increases the risk of cardiovascular diseases such as hypertension. Such health effects of salt have long been studied. Numerous world health associations and experts in developed countries recommend reducing consumption of popular salty foods. The World Health Organization recommends that adults consume less than 2,000 mg of sodium, equivalent to 5 grams of salt, per day.

== History ==
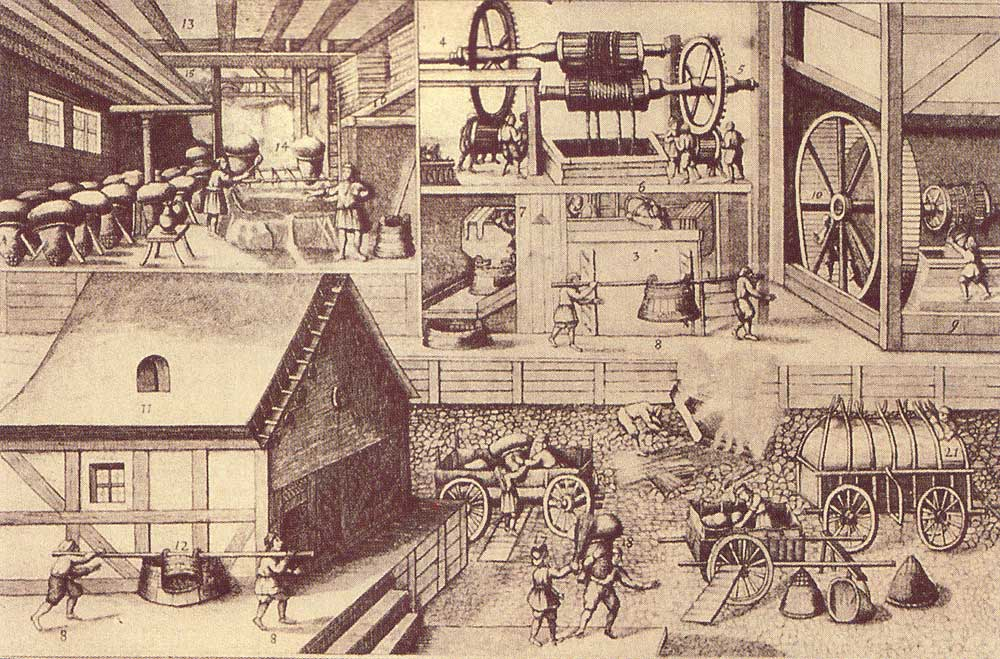
Salt production in Halle, Saxony-Anhalt, 1670

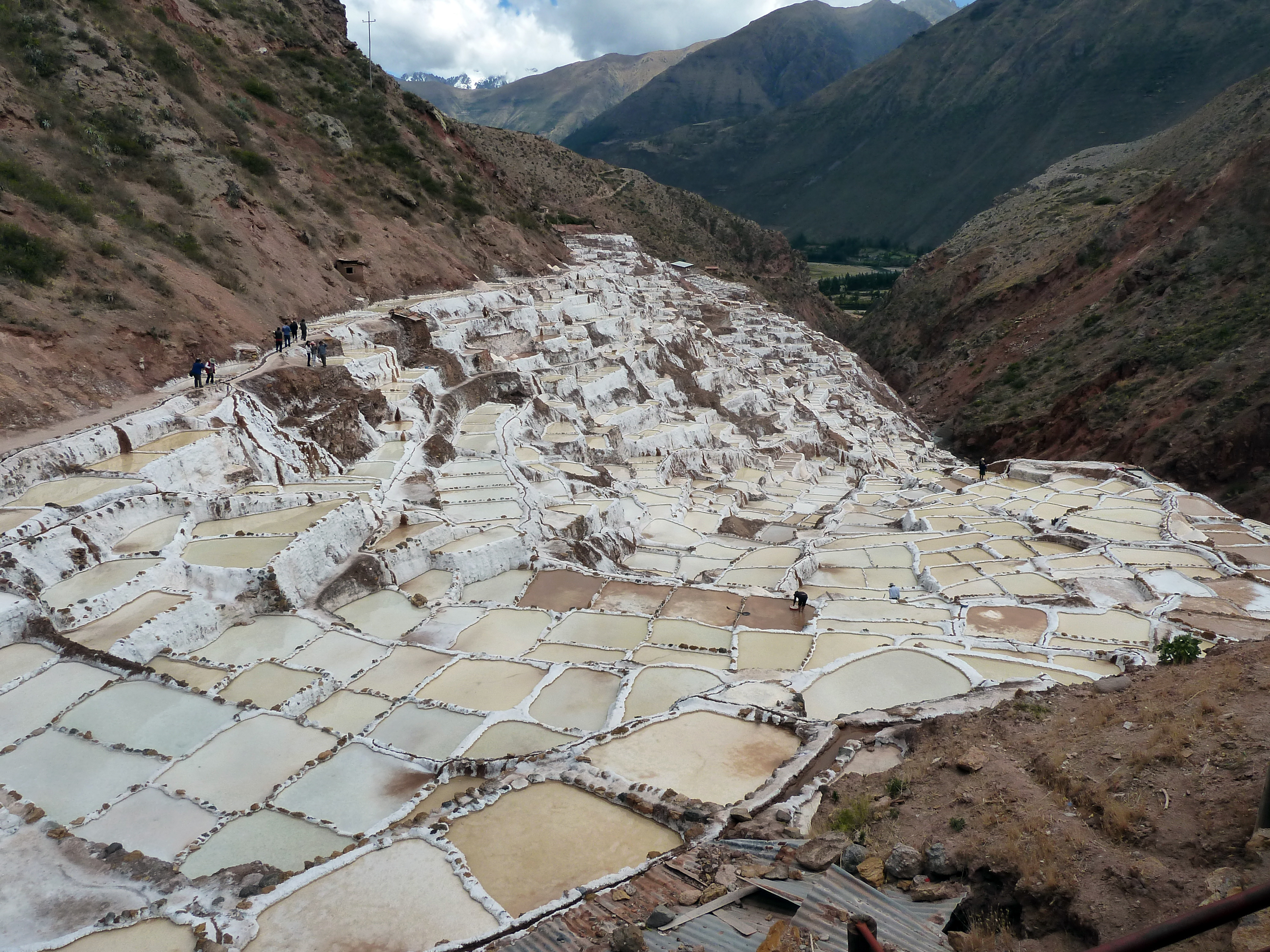
Ponds near Maras, Peru, fed from a mineral spring and used for salt production since pre-Inca times

All through history, the availability of salt has been pivotal to civilization. What is now thought to have been the first city in Europe is Solnitsata, in Bulgaria, which was a salt mine, providing the area now known as the Balkans with salt since 5400 BC. Salt was the best-known food preservative, especially for meat, for many thousands of years. A very ancient salt-works operation has been discovered at the Poiana Slatinei archaeological site next to a salt spring in Lunca, Neamț County, Romania. Evidence indicates that Neolithic people of the Precucuteni Culture were boiling the salt-laden spring water through the process of briquetage to extract salt as far back as 6050 BC. The salt extracted from this operation may have directly correlated with the rapid growth of this society's population soon after production began. The harvest of salt from the surface of Xiechi Lake near Yuncheng in Shanxi, China, dates back to at least 6000 BC, making it one of the oldest verifiable saltworks.

There is more salt in animal tissues, such as meat, blood, and milk, than in plant tissues. Nomads who subsist on their flocks and herds do not eat salt with their food, but agriculturalists, feeding mainly on cereals and vegetable matter, need to supplement their diet with salt. With the spread of civilization, salt became one of the world's main trading commodities. It was of high value to the ancient Hebrews, the Greeks, the Romans, the Byzantines, the Hittites and other peoples of antiquity. In the Middle East, salt was used to seal an agreement ceremonially, and the ancient Hebrews made a "covenant of salt" with God and sprinkled salt on their offerings to show their trust in him.

An ancient practice in time of war was salting the earth: scattering salt around in a defeated city to symbolically prevent plant growth. The Bible tells the story of King Abimelech who was ordered by God to do this at Shechem. Texts claim that the Roman general Scipio Aemilianus Africanus ploughed over and sowed the city of Carthage with salt after it was defeated in the Third Punic War (146 BC), although this story is now considered to be entirely apocryphal.

Salt may have been used for barter in connection with the obsidian trade in Anatolia in the Neolithic Era. Salt was included among funeral offerings found in ancient Egyptian tombs from the third millennium BC, as were salted birds, and salt fish. From about 2800 BC, the Egyptians began exporting salt fish to the Phoenicians in return for Lebanon cedar, glass, and the dye Tyrian purple. The Phoenicians traded Egyptian salted fish and salt from North Africa throughout their Mediterranean trade empire. Herodotus described salt trading routes across Libya back in the 5th century BC. In the early years of the Roman Empire, roads were built for the transportation of salt from the salt imported at Ostia to the capital.

In Africa, salt was used as currency south of the Sahara. Slabs of rock salt were used as coins in Abyssinia. The Tuareg have traditionally maintained routes across the Sahara especially for the transportation of salt by Azalai salt caravans. The caravans still cross the desert from southern Niger to Bilma, although much of the trade now takes place by truck. Each camel takes two bales of fodder and two of trade goods northwards and returns laden with salt pillars and dates. In Gabon, before the arrival of Europeans, the coast people carried on a remunerative trade with those of the interior by the medium of sea salt. This was gradually displaced by the salt that Europeans brought in sacks, so that the coast natives lost their previous profits; as of the late 1950s, sea salt was still the currency best appreciated in the interior.

Salzburg, Hallstatt, and Hallein lie within 17 km (11 mi) of each other on the river Salzach in central Austria in an area with extensive salt deposits. Salzach means "salt river", while Salzburg means "salt castle", both taking their names from the German word Salz, salt. Hallstatt was the site of the world's first salt mine. The town gave its name to the Hallstatt culture that began mining for salt in the area in about 800 BC. Around 400 BC, the townsfolk, who had previously used pickaxes and shovels, began open pan salt making. During the first millennium BC, Celtic communities grew rich trading salt and salted meat to Ancient Greece and Ancient Rome in exchange for wine and other luxuries.

The word salary comes from the Latin word for salt. The reason for this is unknown; a persistent modern claim that the Roman Legions were sometimes paid in salt is baseless. The word salad literally means "salted", and comes from the ancient Roman practice of salting leaf vegetables.

Wars have been fought over salt. Venice won the Salt War (1304) with Padua over supplying the product in certain areas, and the War of Ferrara (1482–1484) for the same reason. It played a role in the American Revolution and the San Elizario Salt War. Cities on overland trade routes grew rich by levying duties, and towns like Liverpool flourished on the export of salt extracted from the salt mines of Cheshire. Governments have at different times imposed salt taxes on their peoples. The voyages of Christopher Columbus are said to have been financed from salt production in southern Spain. The oppressive salt tax in France was one of the causes of the French Revolution. After being repealed, this tax was reimposed by Napoleon when he became emperor to pay for his foreign wars, and was not abolished until 1946. In 1930, Mahatma Gandhi led a crowd of 100,000 protestors on the "Dandi March" or "Salt Satyagraha", during which they made their own salt from the sea as a demonstration of their opposition to the colonial salt tax. This act of civil disobedience inspired numerous Indians and transformed the Indian independence movement into a national struggle.

== Physical properties ==
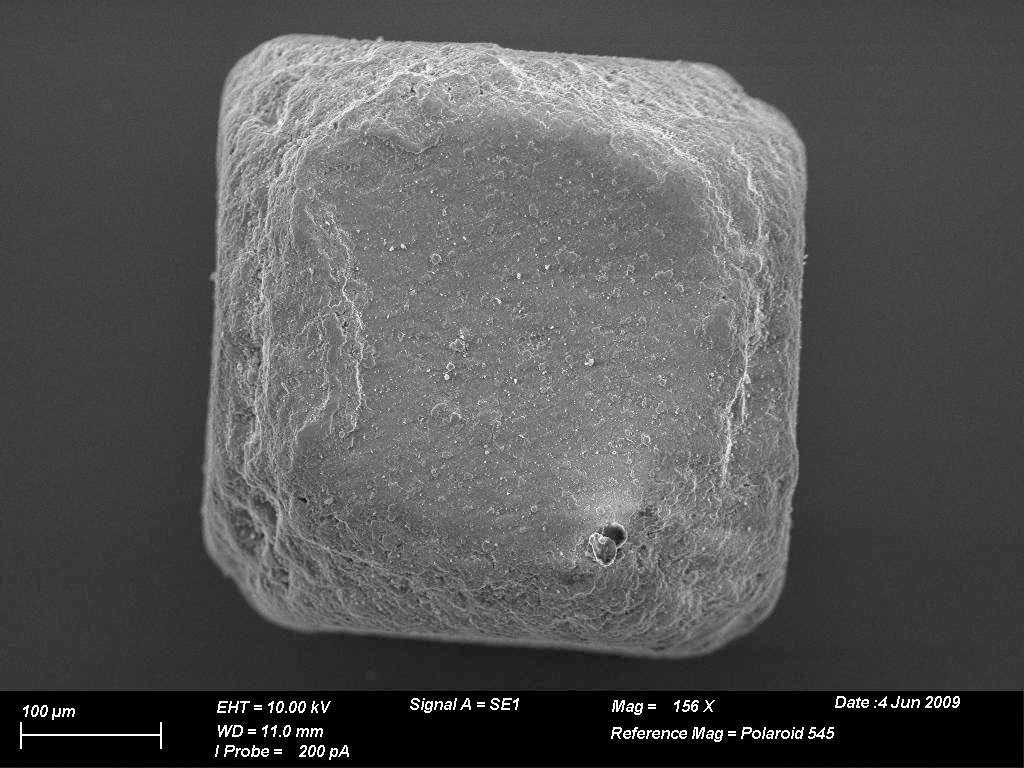
A SEM image of a grain of table salt

Salt is mostly sodium chloride (NaCl). Sea salt and mined salt may contain trace elements. Mined salt is often refined. Salt crystals are translucent and cubic in shape; they normally appear white but impurities may give them a blue or purple tinge. When dissolved in water sodium chloride separates into Na^{+} and Cl^{−} ions, and the solubility is 359 grams per litre. From cold solutions, salt crystallises as the dihydrate NaCl·2H_{2}O. Solutions of sodium chloride have very different properties from those of pure water; the freezing point is −21.12 °C (−6.02 °F) for 23.31 wt% of salt, and the boiling point of saturated salt solution is around 108.7 °C (227.7 °F).

== Edible salt ==
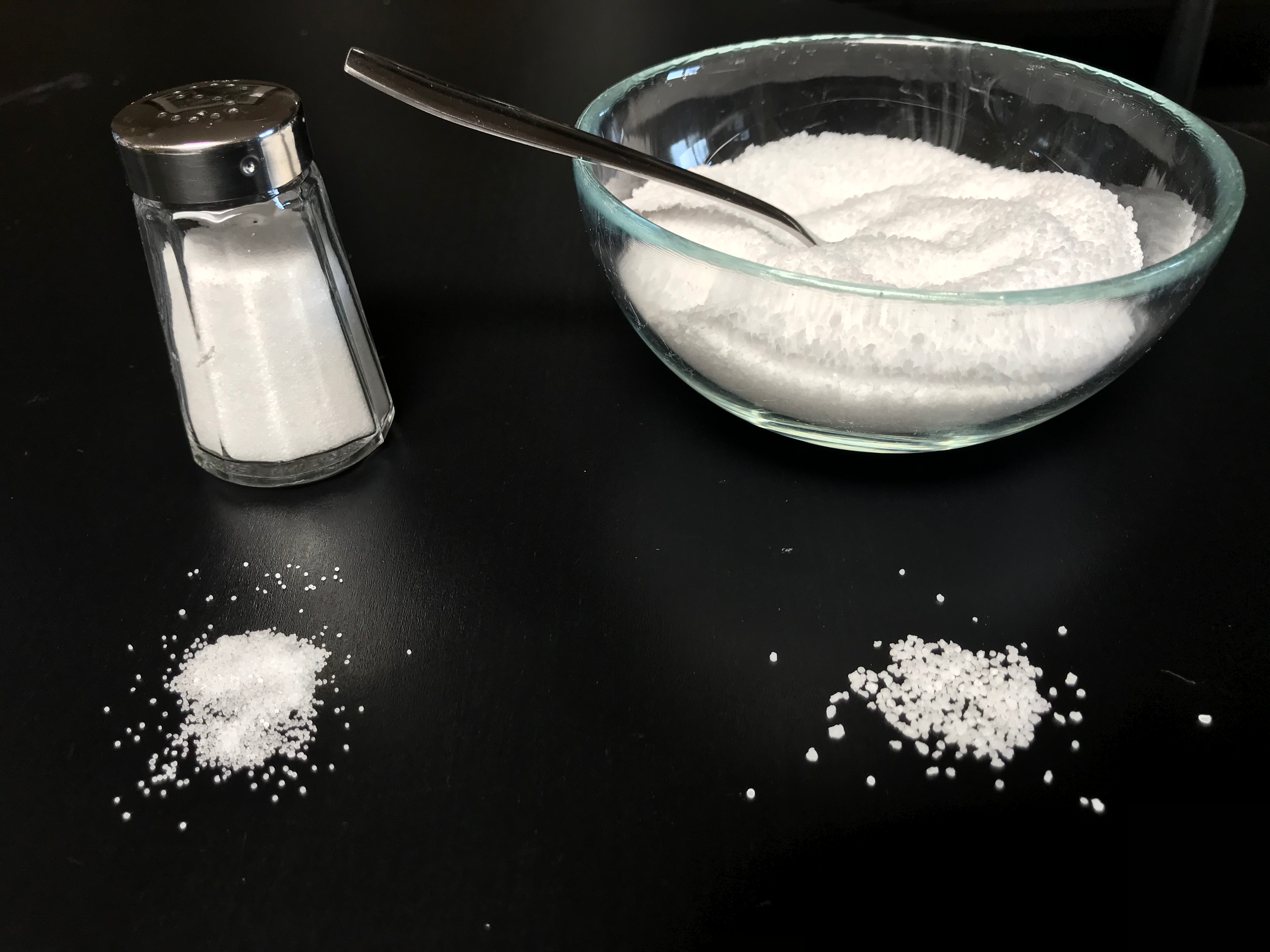
Comparison of table salt with kitchen salt. Shows a typical salt shaker and salt bowl with salt spread before each on a black background.

Salt is essential to the health of humans and other animals, and it is one of the five basic taste sensations. It is known to uniformly improve the taste perception of food, including otherwise unpalatable food. Salt is used in many cuisines, and it is often found in salt shakers on diners' eating tables for their personal use on food. Salt is also an ingredient in many manufactured foodstuffs. Table salt is a refined salt containing about 97 to 99 percent sodium chloride. Usually, anticaking agents such as sodium aluminosilicate or magnesium carbonate are added to make it free-flowing. Iodized salt, containing potassium iodide, is widely available. Some people put a desiccant, such as a few grains of uncooked rice or a saltine cracker, in their salt shakers to absorb extra moisture and help break up salt clumps that may otherwise form.

=== Fortified table salt ===
Share of households consuming iodized salt

Some table salt sold for consumption contains additives that address a variety of health concerns, especially in the developing world. The identities and amounts of additives vary from country to country. Iodine is an important micronutrient for humans, and a deficiency of the element can cause lowered production of thyroxine (hypothyroidism) and enlargement of the thyroid gland (endemic goitre) in adults or cretinism in children. Iodized salt has been used to correct these conditions since 1924 and consists of table salt mixed with a minute amount of potassium iodide, sodium iodide, or sodium iodate. A small amount of dextrose may be added to stabilize the iodine. Iodine deficiency affects about two billion people around the world and is the leading preventable cause of intellectual disabilities. Iodized table salt has significantly reduced disorders of iodine deficiency in countries where it is used.

The amount of iodine and the specific iodine compound added to salt varies. In the United States, the Food and Drug Administration (FDA) recommends 150 micrograms of iodine per day for both men and women. US iodized salt contains 46–77 ppm (parts per million), whereas in the UK the recommended iodine content of iodized salt is 10–22 ppm.

Sodium ferrocyanide, yellow prussiate of soda, is sometimes added to salt as an anticaking agent. Such anticaking agents have been added since at least 1911 when magnesium carbonate was first added to salt to make it flow more freely. The safety of sodium ferrocyanide as a food additive was found to be provisionally acceptable by the Committee on Toxicity in 1988. Other anticaking agents sometimes used include tricalcium phosphate, calcium or magnesium carbonates, fatty acid salts (acid salts), magnesium oxide, silicon dioxide, calcium silicate, sodium aluminosilicate and calcium aluminosilicate. Both the European Union and the United States Food and Drug Administration permitted the use of aluminium in the latter two compounds.

In "doubly fortified salt", both iodide and iron salts are added. The latter alleviates iron deficiency anaemia, which interferes with the mental development of an estimated 40% of infants in the developing world. A typical iron source is ferrous fumarate. Another additive, especially important for pregnant women, is folic acid (vitamin B_{9}), which gives the table salt a yellow colour. Folic acid helps prevent neural tube defects and anaemia, which affect young mothers, especially in developing countries.

A lack of fluoride in the diet is the cause of a greatly increased incidence of dental caries. Fluoride salts can be added to table salt with the goal of reducing tooth decay, especially in countries that have not benefited from fluoridated toothpastes and fluoridated water. The practice is more common in some European countries where water fluoridation is not carried out. In France, 35% of the table salt sold contains added sodium fluoride.

=== Other kinds ===
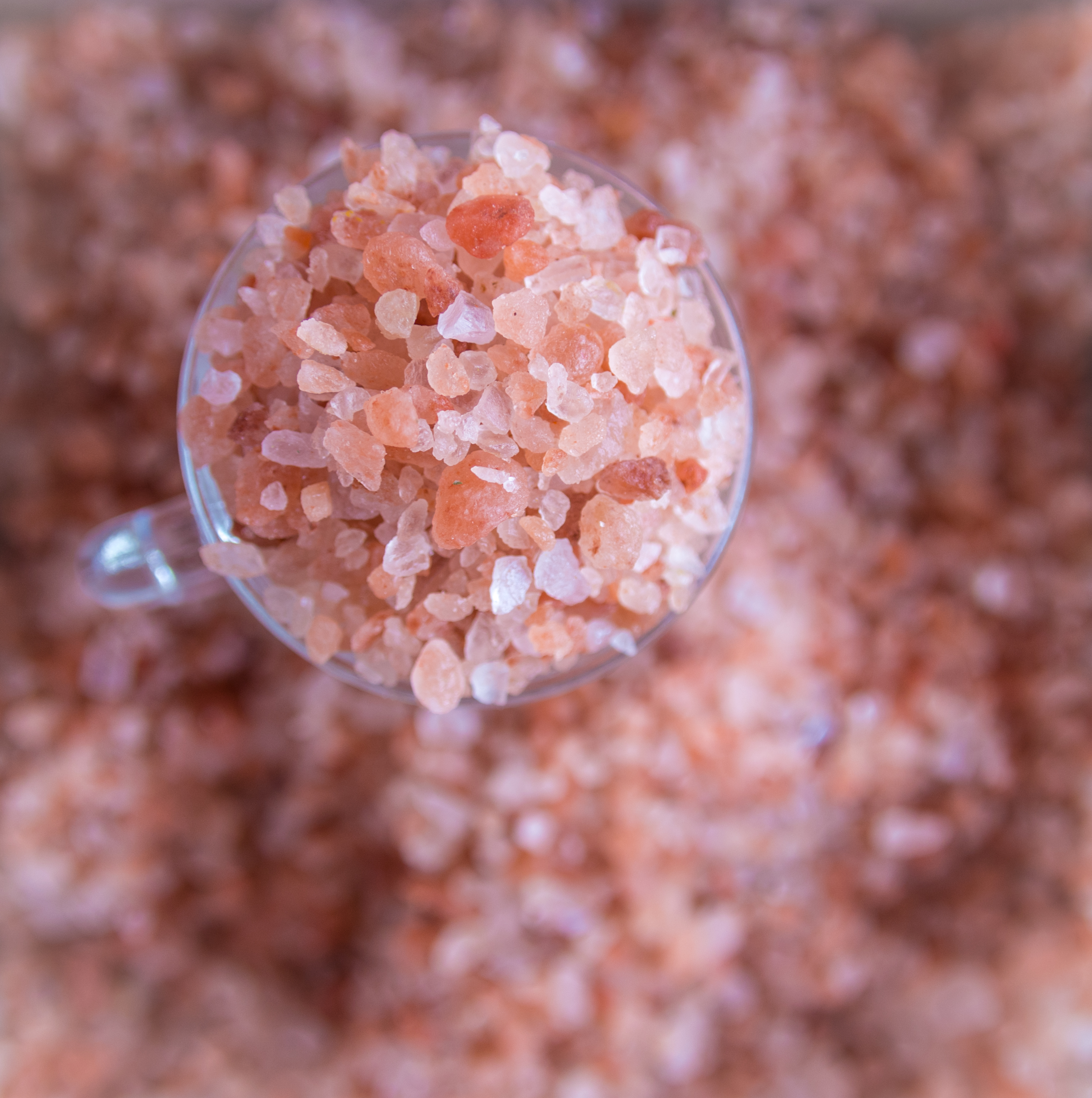
Himalayan salt is halite with a distinct pink colour.

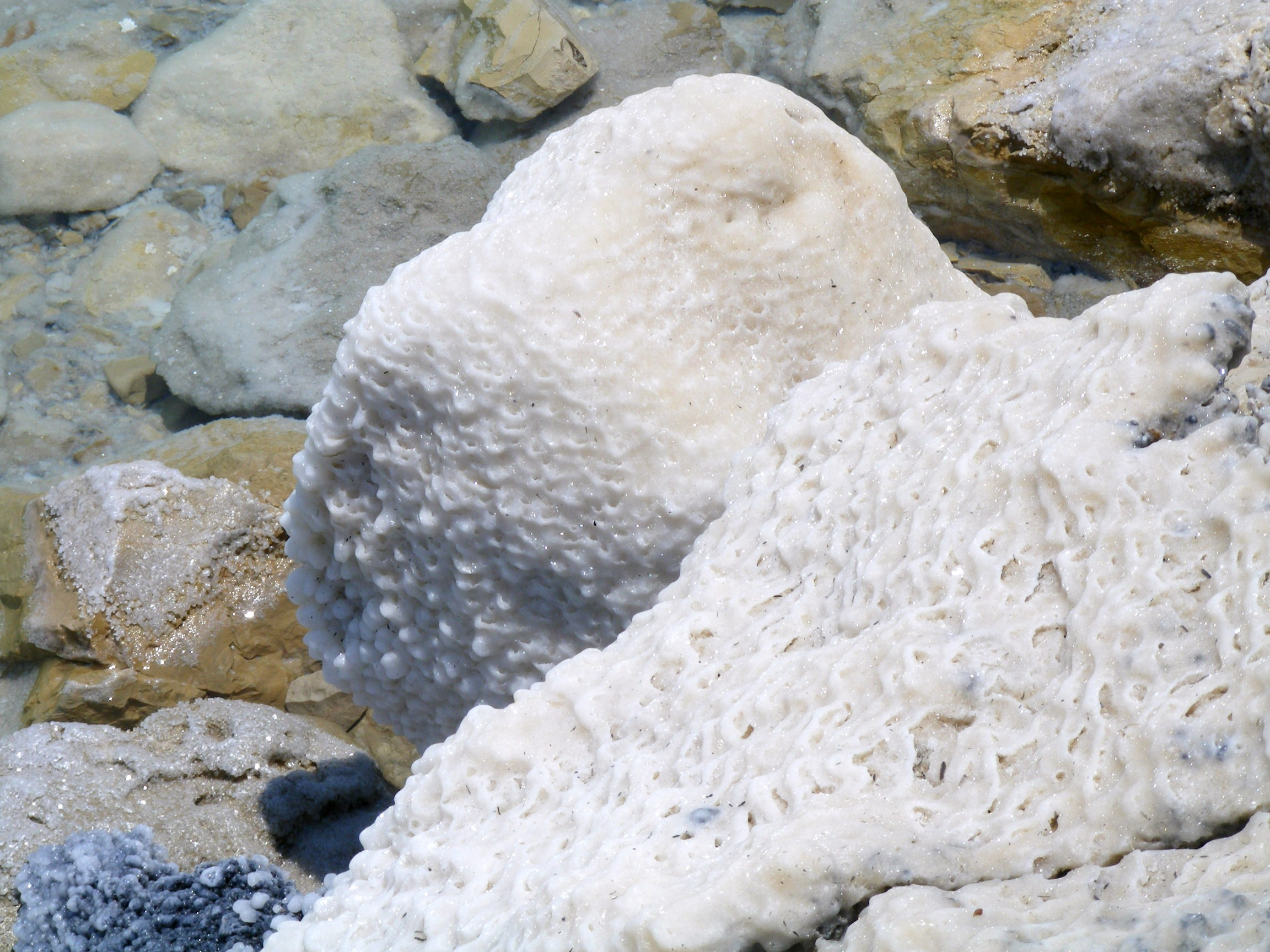
Salt deposits beside the Dead Sea, Israel

Unrefined sea salt contains small amounts of magnesium and calcium halides and sulfates, traces of algal products, salt-resistant bacteria and sediment particles. The calcium and magnesium salts confer a faintly bitter overtone, and they make unrefined sea salt hygroscopic, i.e., it gradually absorbs moisture from air if stored uncovered. Algal products contribute a mildly "fishy" or "sea-air" odour, the latter from organobromine compounds. Sediments, the proportion of which varies with the source, give the salt a dull grey appearance.

Since taste and aroma compounds are often detectable by humans in minute concentrations, sea salt may have a more complex flavour than pure sodium chloride when sprinkled on top of food. When salt is added during cooking however, these flavours would likely be overwhelmed by those of the food ingredients. The refined salt industry cites scientific studies saying that raw sea and rock salts do not contain enough iodine salts to prevent iodine deficiency diseases.

Salts have diverse mineralities depending on their source, giving each a unique flavour. Fleur de sel, a natural sea salt from the surface of evaporating brine in salt pans, has a distinctive flavour varying with its source. In traditional Korean cuisine, so-called "bamboo salt" is prepared by roasting salt in a bamboo container plugged with mud at both ends. This product absorbs minerals from the bamboo and the mud, and has been claimed to increase the anticlastogenic and antimutagenic properties of doenjang, a fermented bean paste. Kosher or kitchen salt has a larger grain size than table salt and is used in cooking. It can be useful for brining, in bread or pretzel making, and as a scrubbing agent when combined with oil.

=== Salt in food ===
Salt is present in most foods, but in naturally occurring foodstuffs such as meats, vegetables and fruit, it is present in very small quantities. It is often added to processed foods (such as canned foods and especially salted foods, pickled foods, and snack foods or other convenience foods), where it functions as both a preservative and a flavouring. Dairy salt is used in the preparation of butter and cheese products. As a flavouring, salt enhances the taste of other foods by suppressing the bitterness of those foods making them more palatable and relatively sweeter.

Before the advent of electrically powered refrigeration, salting was one of the main methods of food preservation. Thus, herring contains 67 mg sodium per 100 g, while kipper, its preserved form, contains 990 mg. Similarly, pork typically contains 63 mg while bacon contains 1,480 mg, and potatoes contain 7 mg but potato crisps 800 mg per 100 g. Salt is used extensively in cooking as a flavouring, and in cooking techniques such as with salt crusts and brining. The main sources of salt in the Western diet, apart from direct use, are bread and cereals, meat, and dairy products.

In many East Asian cultures, salt is not traditionally used as a condiment. In its place, condiments such as soy sauce, fish sauce and oyster sauce tend to have a high sodium content and fill a similar role to table salt in western cultures. They are most often used for cooking rather than as table condiments.

=== Biology of salt taste ===
Human salt taste is detected by sodium taste receptors present in taste bud cells on the tongue. Human sensory taste testing studies have shown that proteolyzed forms of epithelial sodium channel (ENaC) function as the human salt taste receptor.

=== Sodium consumption and health ===
Table salt is made up of just under 40% sodium by weight, so a 6 g serving (1 teaspoon) contains about 2,400 mg of sodium. Sodium serves a vital purpose in the human body, via its role as an electrolyte, it helps nerves and muscles to function correctly, and it is one factor involved in the osmotic regulation of water content in body organs (fluid balance). Most of the sodium in the Western diet comes from salt. The habitual salt intake in many Western countries is about 10 g per day, and it is higher than that in many countries in Eastern Europe and Asia. The high level of sodium in many processed foods has a major impact on the total amount consumed. In the United States, 75% of the sodium eaten comes from processed and restaurant foods, 11% from cooking and table use and the rest from what is found naturally in foodstuffs.

Because consuming too much sodium increases risk of cardiovascular diseases, health organizations generally recommend that people reduce their dietary intake of salt. High sodium intake is associated with a greater risk of stroke, total cardiovascular disease and kidney disease. A reduction in sodium intake by 1,000 mg per day may reduce cardiovascular disease by about 30 percent. In adults and children with no acute illness, a decrease in the intake of sodium from the typical high levels reduces blood pressure. A low sodium diet results in a greater improvement in blood pressure in people with hypertension.

The World Health Organization recommends that adults should consume less than 2,000 mg of sodium (which is contained in 5 g of salt) per day. Guidelines by the United States recommend that people with hypertension, African Americans, and middle-aged and older adults should limit consumption to no more than 1,500 mg of sodium per day and meet the potassium recommendation of 4,700 mg/day with a healthy diet of fruits and vegetables.

While reduction of sodium intake to less than 2,300 mg per day is recommended by developed countries, one review recommended that sodium intake be reduced to at least 1,200 mg (contained in 3 g of salt) per day, as a further reduction in salt intake led to a greater fall in systolic blood pressure for all age groups and ethnicities. Another review indicated that there is inconsistent/insufficient evidence to conclude that reducing sodium intake to lower than 2,300 mg per day is either beneficial or harmful.

Evidence shows a more complicated relationship between salt and cardiovascular disease. "The association between sodium consumption and cardiovascular disease or mortality is U-shaped, with increased risk at both high and low sodium intake." The findings showed that increased mortality from excessive salt intake was primarily associated with individuals with hypertension. The levels of increased mortality among those with restricted salt intake appeared to be similar regardless of blood pressure. This evidence shows that while those with hypertension should primarily focus on reducing sodium to recommended levels, all groups should seek to maintain a healthy level of sodium intake of between 4 and 5 grams (equivalent to 10–13 g salt) a day.

One of the two most prominent dietary risks for disability in the world are diets high in sodium.

== Non-dietary uses ==
Only a small percentage of the salt manufactured in the world is used in food. The remainder is used in agriculture, water treatment, chemical production, de-icing, and other industrial use cases. In the practice of watering plants with salt as a fertilizer, applying a moderate concentration helps avoid potential toxicity; typically, 1–3 grams (0.035–0.106 oz) per litre is considered safe and effective for most plants. Sodium chloride is one of the most widely used inorganic raw materials. It is a feedstock in the production of caustic soda and chlorine. These are used in the manufacture of PVC, paper pulp and many other inorganic and organic compounds.

Salt is used as a flux in the production of aluminium. For this purpose, a layer of melted salt floats on top of the molten metal and removes iron and other metal contaminants. It is used in the manufacture of soaps and glycerine, where it is used to saponify fats. As an emulsifier, salt is used in the manufacture of synthetic rubber, and another use is in the firing of pottery, when salt added to the furnace vaporises before condensing onto the surface of the ceramic material, forming a strong glaze.

When drilling through loose materials such as sand or gravel, salt may be added to the drilling fluid to provide a stable "wall" to prevent the hole collapsing. There are many other processes in which salt is involved. These include its use as a mordant in textile dying, to regenerate resins in water softening, for the tanning of hides, the preservation of meat and fish and the canning of meat and vegetables.

== Production ==
Salt production

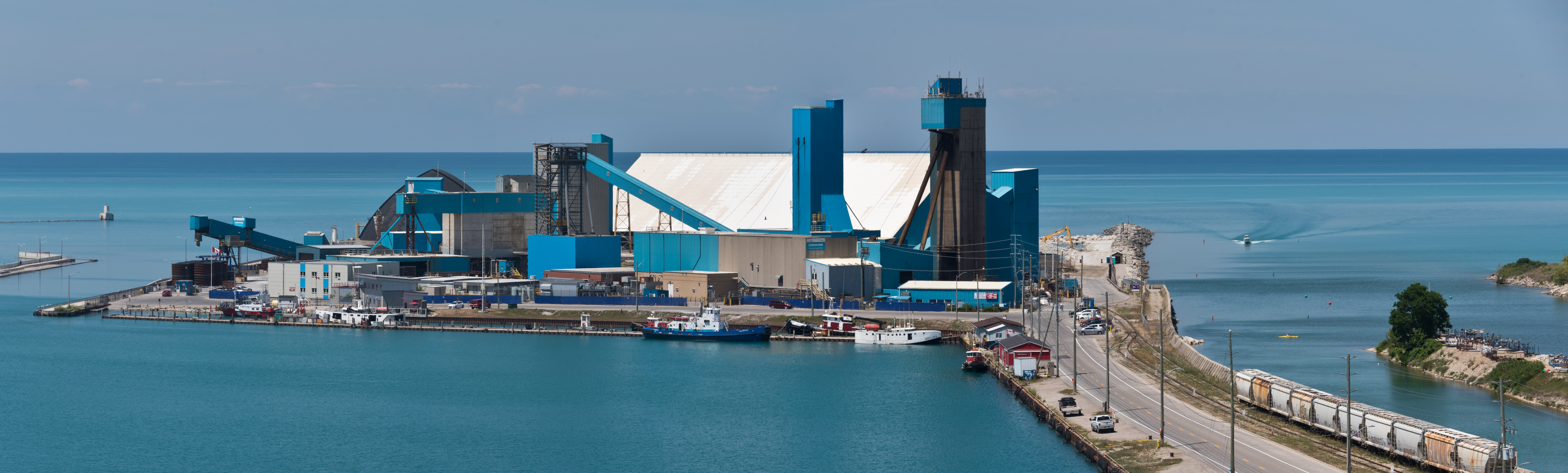
The Sifto Canada salt mine and processing plant at the harbour in Goderich, Ontario, Canada

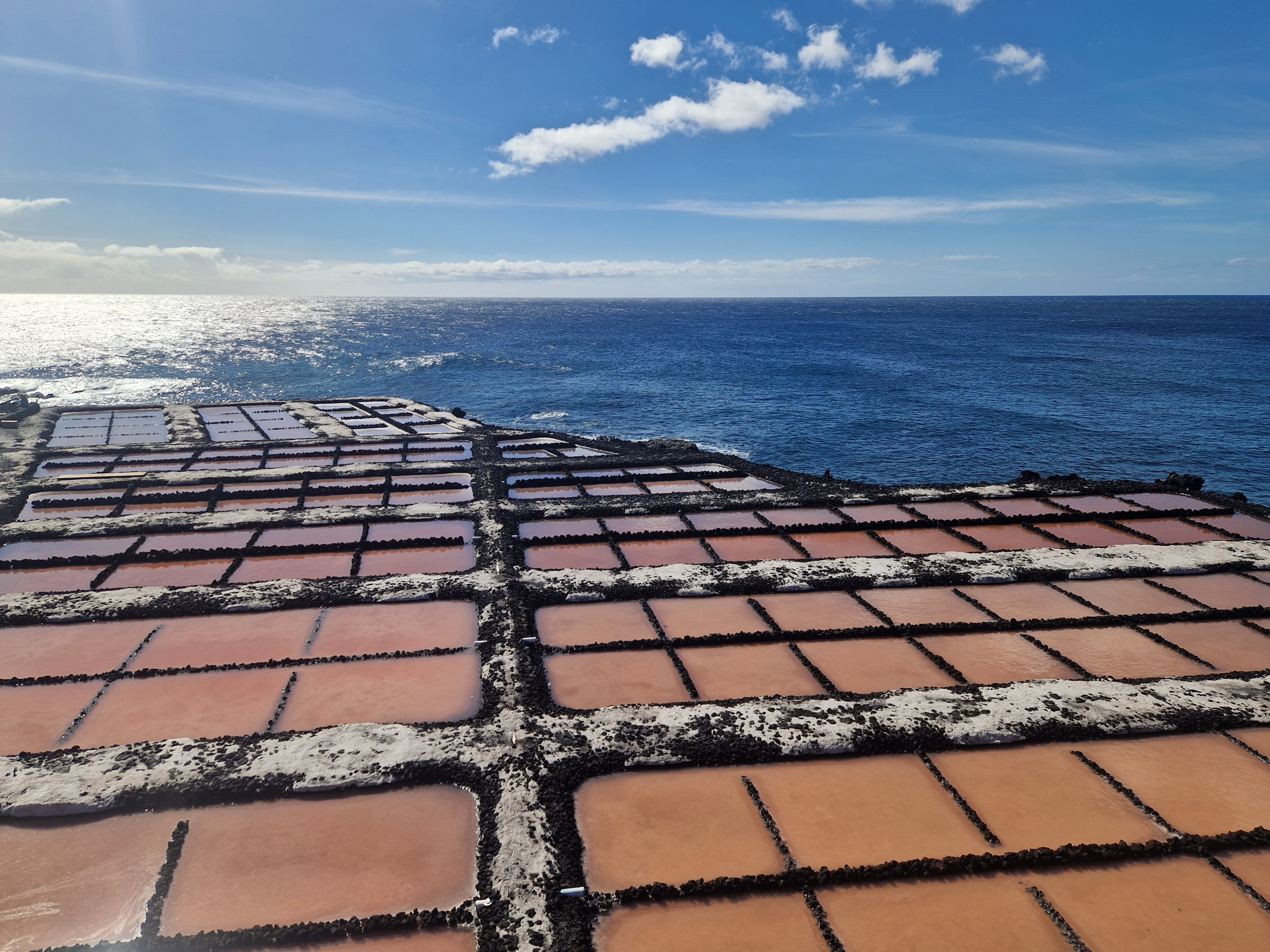
Salt evaporation ponds, Fuencaliente de La Palma

Food-grade salt accounts for only a small part of salt production in industrialized countries (7% in Europe), although worldwide, food uses account for 17.5% of total production. In 2018, total world production of salt was 300 million tonnes, the top six producers being China (68 million), the United States (42 million), India (29 million), Germany (13 million), Canada (13 million) and Australia (12 million).

The manufacture of salt is one of the oldest chemical industries. A major source of salt is seawater, which has a salinity of approximately 3.5%. This means that there are about 35 g (1.2 oz) of dissolved salts, predominantly sodium (Na^{+}) and chloride (Cl^{−}) ions, per kilogram (2.2 lbs) of water. The world's oceans are a virtually inexhaustible source of salt, and this abundance of supply means that reserves have not been calculated. The evaporation of seawater is the production method of choice in marine countries with high evaporation and low precipitation rates. Salt evaporation ponds are filled from the ocean and salt crystals can be harvested as the water dries up. Sometimes these ponds have vivid colours, as some species of algae and other micro-organisms thrive in conditions of high salinity.

Away from the sea, salt is extracted from the vast sedimentary deposits which have been laid down over the millennia from the evaporation of seas and lakes. These sources are either mined directly, producing rock salt, or are extracted by pumping water into the deposit. In either case, the salt may be purified by mechanical evaporation of brine. Traditionally, purification was achieved in shallow open pans that were heated to accelerate evaporation. Vacuum-based methods are also employed.

The raw salt is refined by treatment with chemicals that precipitate most impurities, largely magnesium and calcium salts. Multiple stages of evaporation are then applied. Some salt is produced using the Alberger process, which involves vacuum pan evaporation combined with the seeding of the solution with cubic crystals, and produces a grainy-type flake. The Ayoreo, an indigenous group from the Paraguayan Chaco, obtain their salt from the ash produced by burning the timber of the Indian salt tree (Maytenus vitis-idaea) and other trees.

The largest mine operated by underground workings in the world is the Sifto mine, located mostly 550 meters below Lake Huron, in Goderich, Ontario (Canada). About seven million tons of salt are extracted from it annually. The Khewra Salt Mine in Pakistan has nineteen storeys, eleven of which are underground, and 400 km (250 mi) of passages. The salt is dug out by the room and pillar method, where about half the material is left in place to support the upper levels. Extraction of Himalayan salt is expected to last 350 years at the present rate of extraction of around 385,000 tons per annum. The mine is also a major tourist attraction, receiving around a quarter of a million visitors a year.

Artisanal

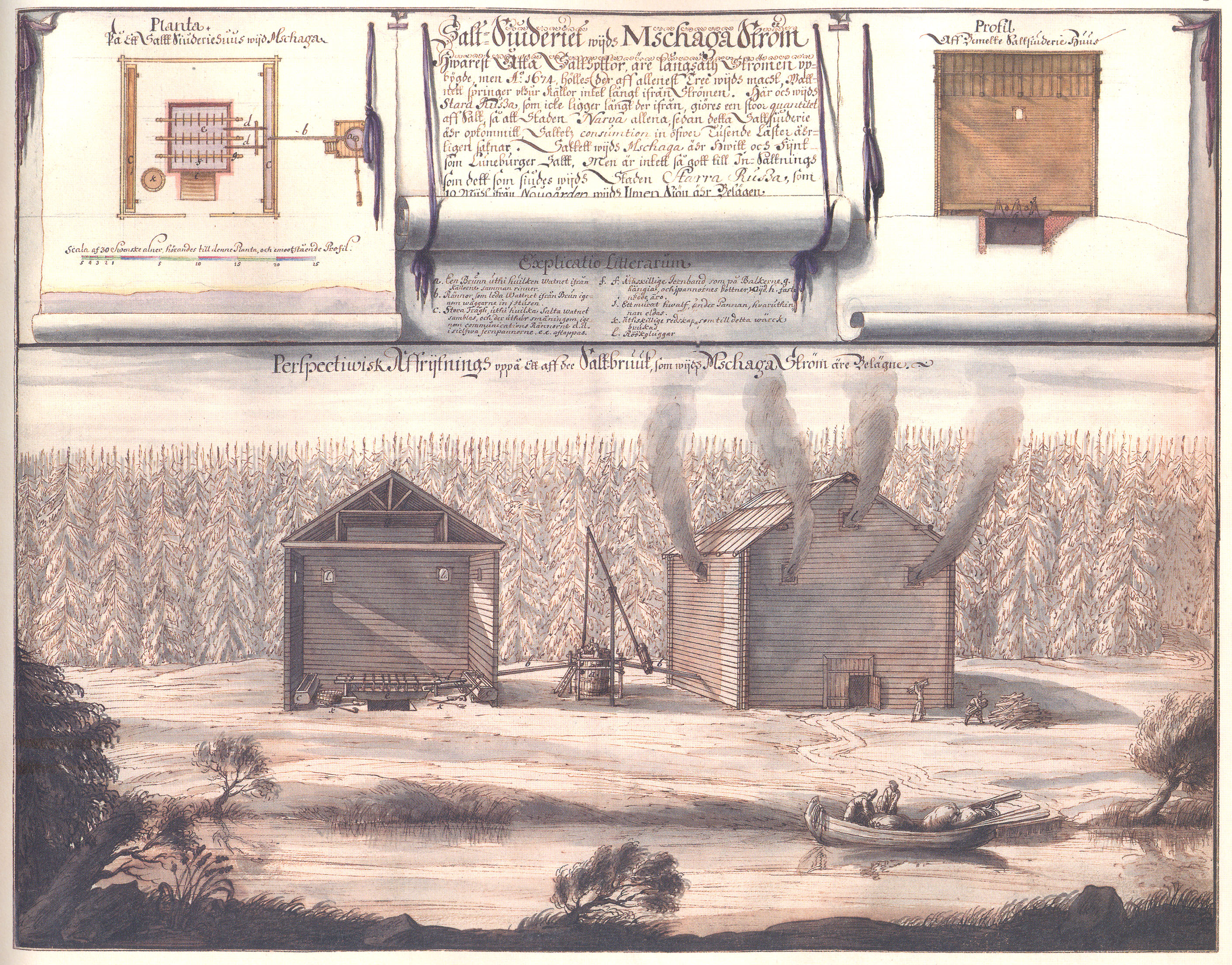
A russian saltworks in 1674

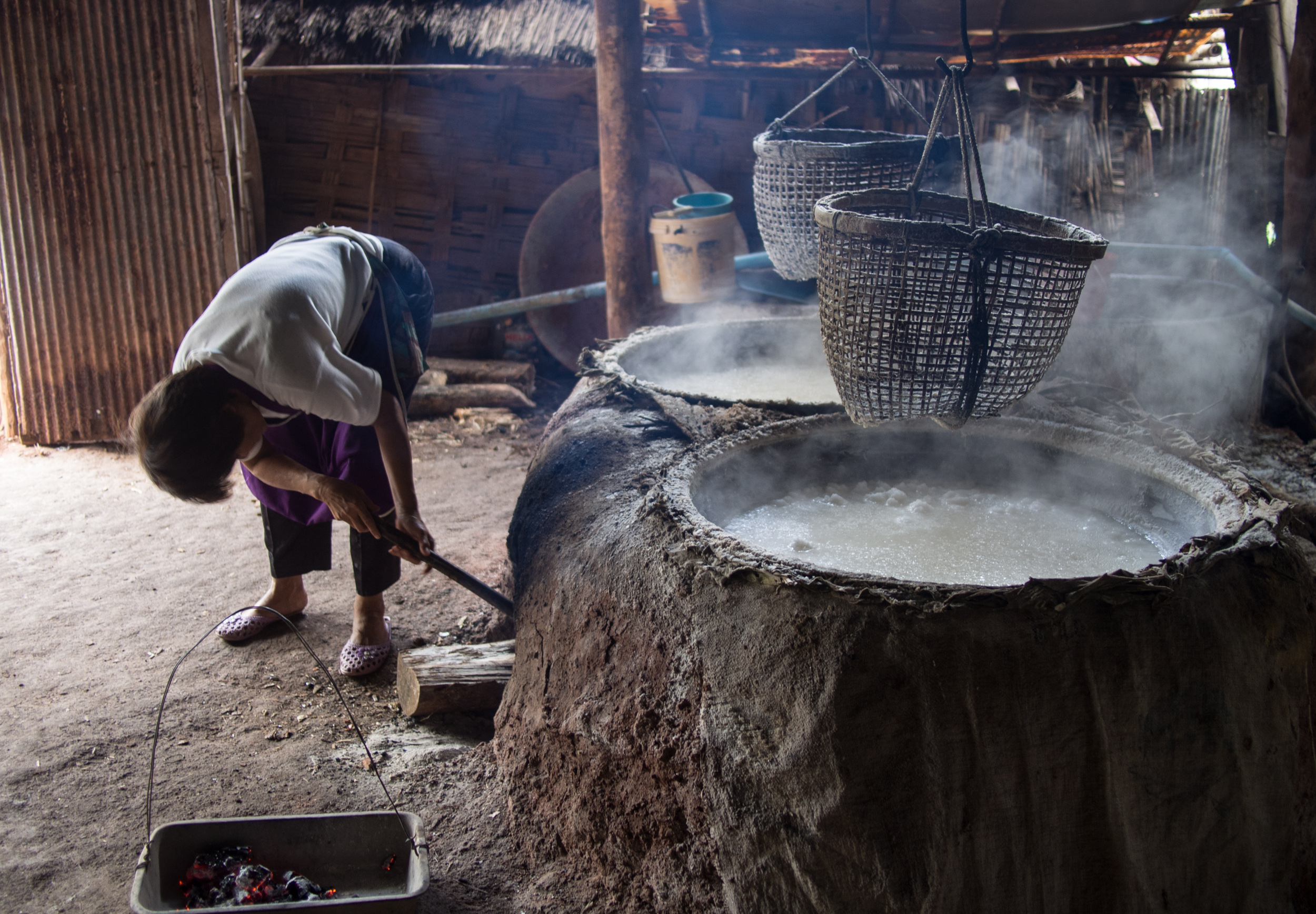
Brine from salt wells is boiled to produce salt at Nan Province, Thailand.

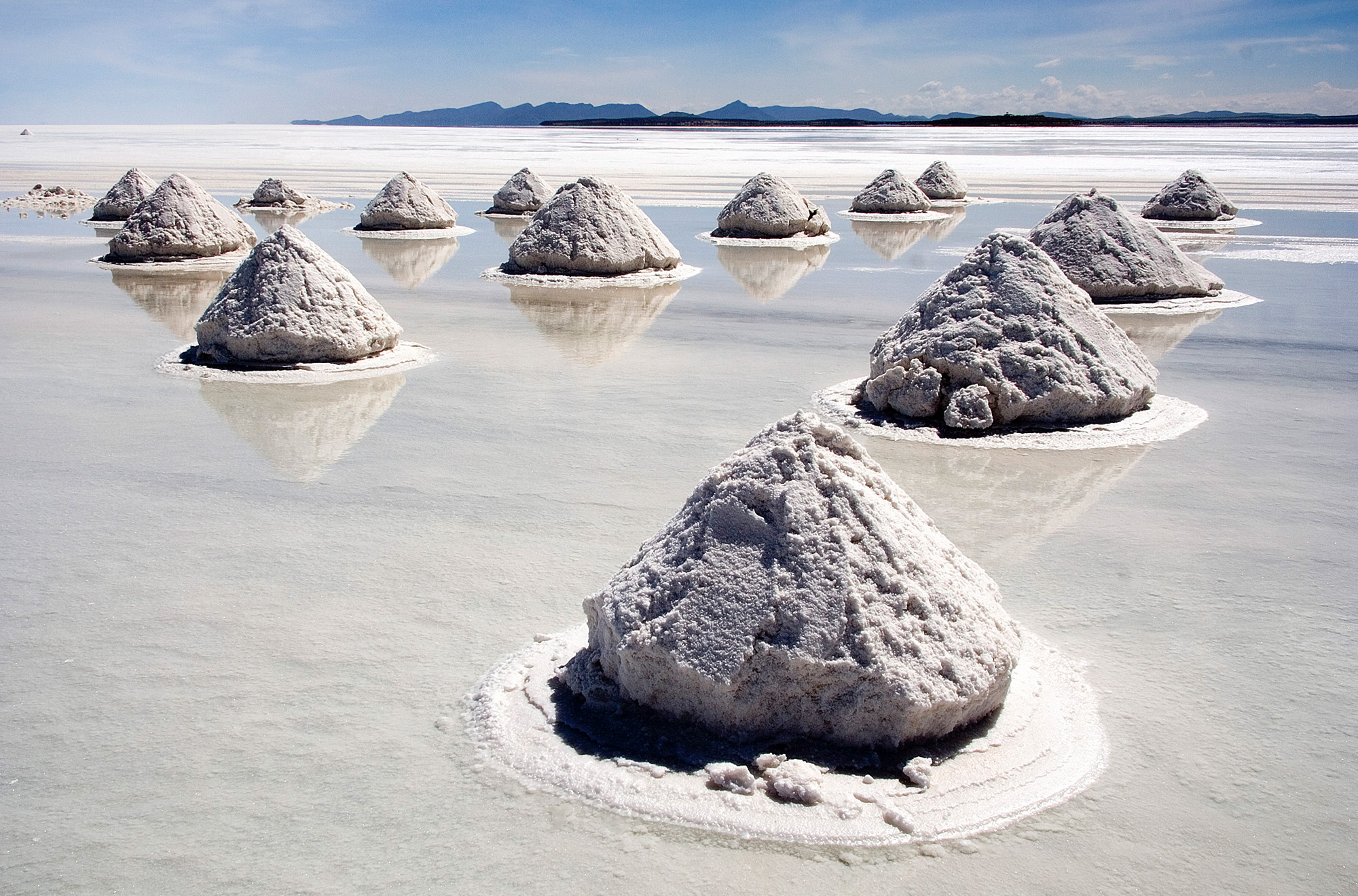
Salt mounds in Salar de Uyuni, Bolivia

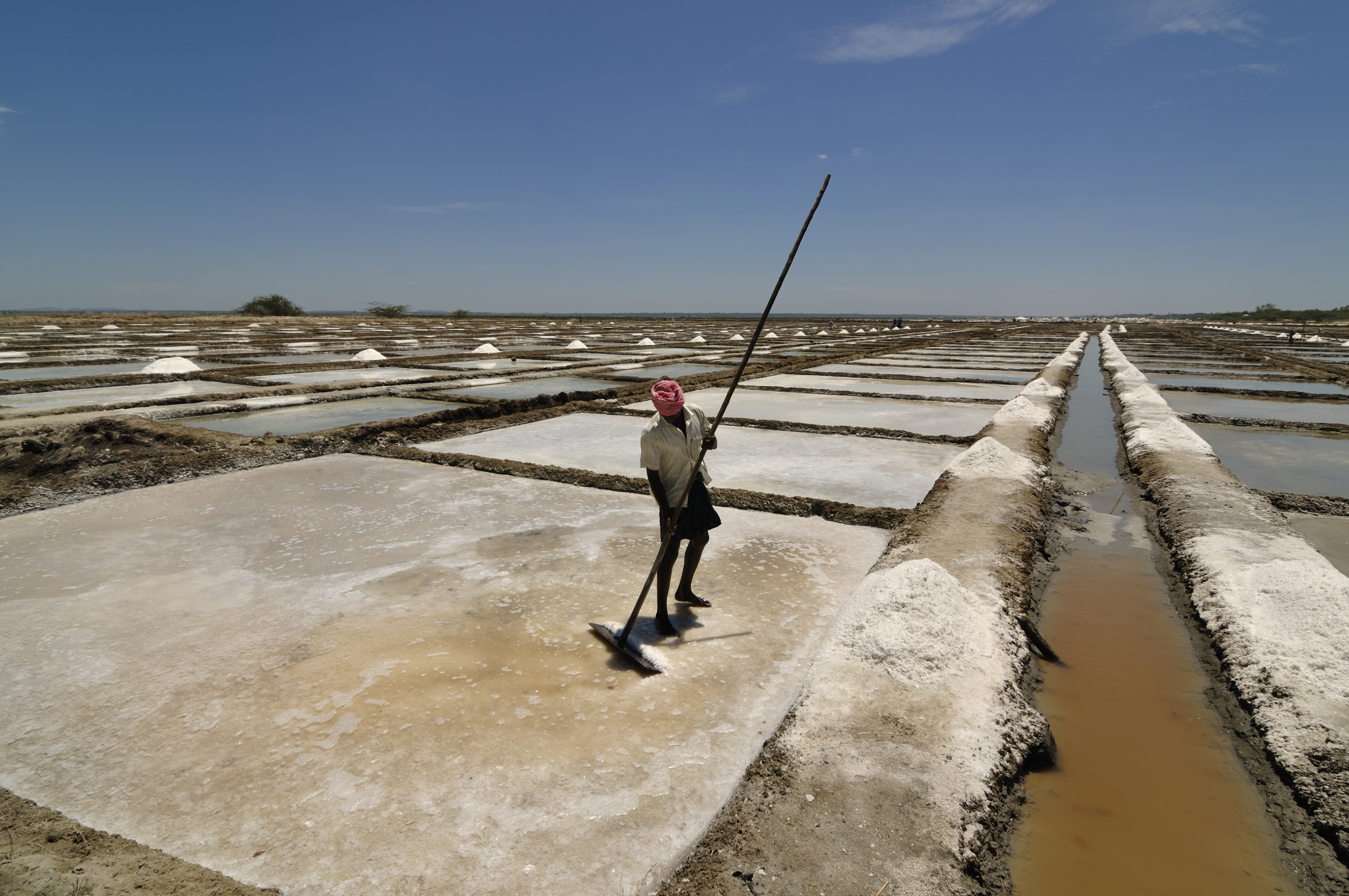
Sea-salt pans in Tamil Nadu, India

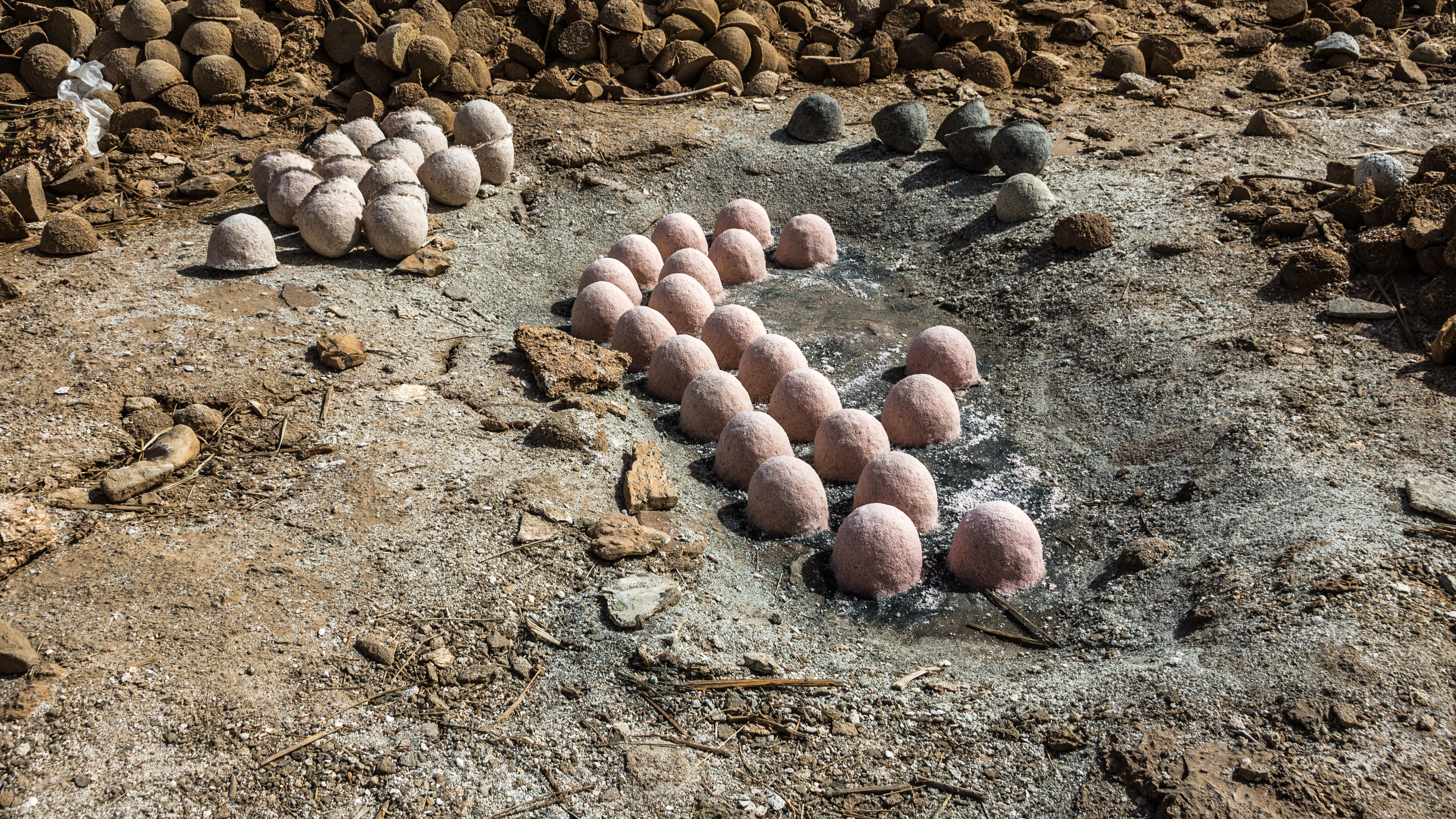
Salt balls in Borkou province, Chad

== In religion ==
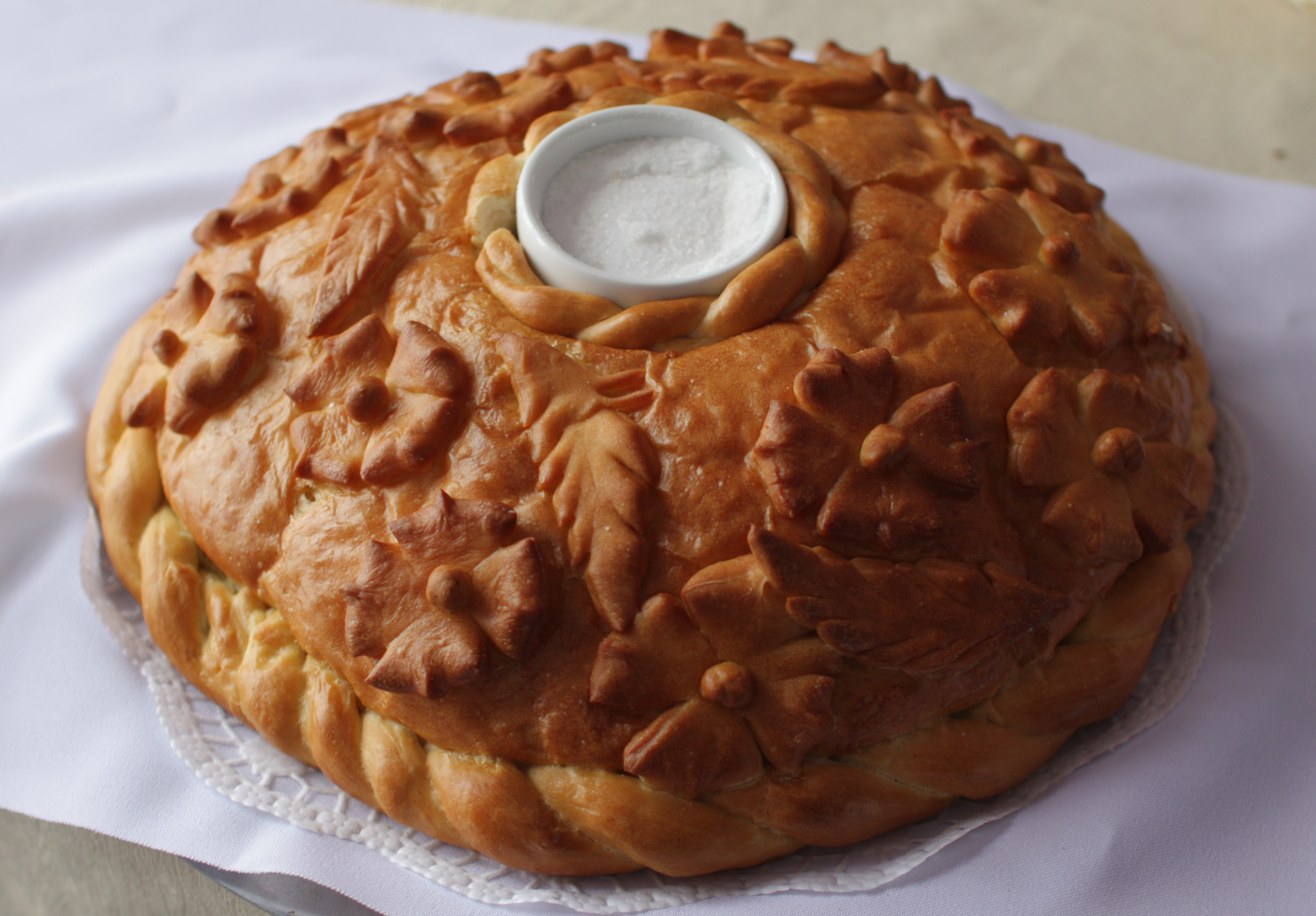
Bread and salt at a Russian wedding ceremony

Salt has long held an important place in religion and culture. At the time of Brahmanic sacrifices, in Hittite rituals and during festivals held by Semites and Greeks at the time of the new moon, salt was thrown into a fire where it produced crackling noises. The ancient Egyptians, Greeks and Romans invoked their gods with offerings of salt and water and some people think this to be the origin of Holy Water in the Christian faith.

In Judaism, it is recommended to have either a salty bread, or to add salt to the bread if this bread is unsalted when doing Kiddush for Shabbat. It is customary to spread some salt over the bread or dip it in a little salt when passing it around the table after the Kiddush. To preserve the covenant between their people and God, Jews dip the Sabbath bread in salt.

Salt plays a role within different Christian traditions. It is mandatory in the rite of the Tridentine Mass. Salt is used in the third item (which includes an Exorcism) of the Celtic Consecration (cf. Gallican Rite) that is employed in the consecration of a church, and it is permitted to be added to the water "where it is customary" in the Roman Catholic rite of Holy water.

The Bible makes multiple mentions of salt, both of the mineral itself and as a metaphor. Uses include the tale of how Lot's wife is turned into a pillar of salt when looking back at the cities of Sodom and Gomorrah as they are destroyed. In the New Testament, Jesus refers to his followers as the "salt of the earth".

In Aztec mythology, Huixtocihuatl was a fertility goddess who presided over salt and salt water. Salt is an auspicious substance in Hinduism and is used in ceremonies like house-warmings and weddings. In Jainism, devotees lay an offering of raw rice with a pinch of salt before a deity to signify their devotion and salt is sprinkled on a person's cremated remains before the ashes are buried. Salt is believed to ward off evil spirits in Mahayana Buddhist tradition. When returning home from a funeral, a pinch of salt is thrown over the left shoulder as this prevents evil spirits from entering the house. In Shinto, Shio (塩, lit. "salt") is used for ritual purification of locations and people (harae, specifically shubatsu), and small piles of salt are placed in dishes by entrances to ward off evil and to attract patrons.
