= City upon a Hill =

Phrase derived from the parable of Salt and Light

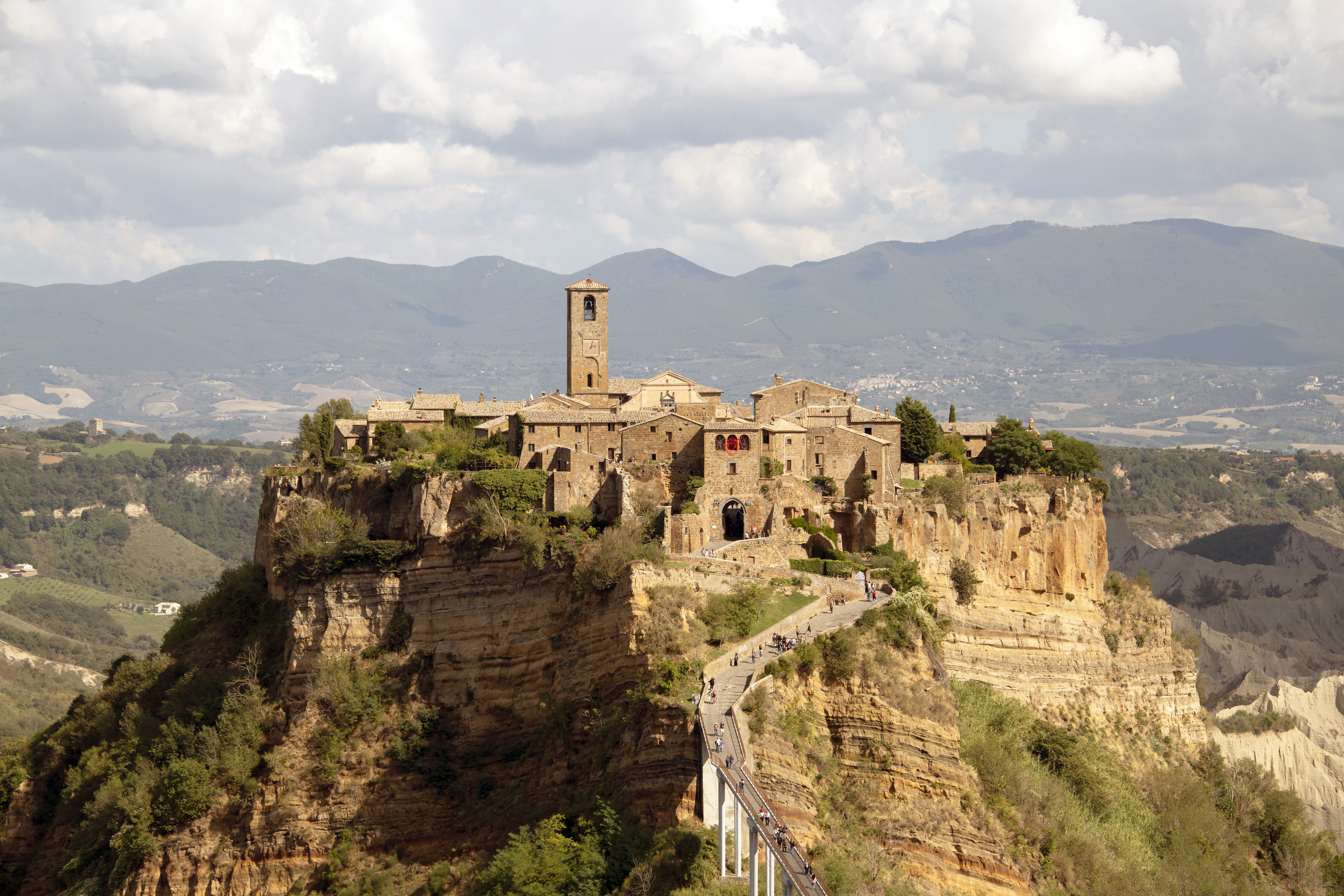
Civita di Bagnoregio, an unrelated city set on a hill in Italy dating back to the era in which the phrase is derived from

"City upon a hill" is a phrase derived from the teaching of salt and light in Jesus's Sermon on the Mount in the New Testament. (Note: Matthew 5:14: "You are the light of the world. A city that is set on a hill cannot be hidden.") Originally applied to the city of Boston by early 17th century Puritans, it came to adopt broader use in political rhetoric in United States politics, that of a declaration of American exceptionalism, and referring to America acting as a "beacon of hope" for the world.

You are the light of the world. A city on a hill cannot be hidden.

— Jesus, Book of Matthew 5:14

== John Winthrop speech ==
This scripture was cited at the end of Puritan John Winthrop's lecture or treatise, "A Model of Christian Charity" delivered on March 21, 1630, at Holyrood Church in Southampton, before his first group of Massachusetts Bay colonists embarked on the ship Arbella to settle Boston. In quoting Matthew's Gospel (5:14) in which Jesus warns, "a city on a hill cannot be hid," Winthrop warned his fellow Puritans that their new community would be "as a city upon a hill, the eyes of all people are upon us", meaning, if the Puritans failed to uphold their covenant with God, then their sins and errors would be exposed for all the world to see: "So that if we shall deal falsely with our God in this work we have undertaken and so cause him to withdraw his present help from us, we shall be made a story and a byword through the world".

Winthrop's lecture was forgotten for nearly two hundred years until the Massachusetts Historical Society published it in 1839. It remained an obscure reference for more than another century until Cold War era historians and political leaders reinterpreted the event, crediting Winthrop's text, erroneously, as the foundational document of the idea of American exceptionalism.

Winthrop's warning that "we will become a story" has been fulfilled several times in the four centuries since, as described in Wayward Puritans: A Study in the Sociology of Deviance by Kai T. Erikson in 1966.

More recently, Princeton historian Dan T. Rogers, in his 2018 book As a City on a Hill: The Story of America's Most Famous Lay Sermon, made an effort to correct the record, arguing that there was no grand sense of destiny among the first Puritans to settle Boston. They carried no ambitions to build a New Jerusalem, they did not name their new home Zion, or Canaan, the promised land of milk and honey; rather, they sought only a place to uphold their covenant with God, free from the interference they experienced in England. By the second generation of settlement, New England was considered a backwater in the Protestant Reformation, an inconsequential afterthought to the Puritan Commonwealth in England and the wealthier Dutch Republic, and in truth, America's sense of destiny came generations later.

== Use in American politics ==
On January 9, 1961, President-elect John F. Kennedy quoted the phrase during an address delivered to the general court of Massachusetts:

I have been guided by the standard John Winthrop set before his shipmates on the flagship Arabella three hundred and thirty-one years ago, as they, too, faced the task of building a new government on a perilous frontier. "We must always consider", he said, "that we shall be as a city upon a hill—the eyes of all people are upon us". Today the eyes of all people are truly upon us—and our governments, in every branch, at every level, national, state and local, must be as a city upon a hill—constructed and inhabited by men aware of their great trust and their great responsibilities. For we are setting out upon a voyage in 1961 no less hazardous than that undertaken by the Arabella in 1630. We are committing ourselves to tasks of statecraft no less awesome than that of governing the Massachusetts Bay Colony, beset as it was then by terror without and disorder within. History will not judge our endeavors—and a government cannot be selected—merely on the basis of color or creed or even party affiliation. Neither will competence and loyalty and stature, while essential to the utmost, suffice in times such as these. For of those to whom much is given, much is required.

On November 3, 1980, Ronald Reagan referred to the same event and image in his election-eve address, "A Vision for America". Reagan was reported to have been inspired by author Manly P. Hall and his book The Secret Destiny of America, which alleged a secret order of philosophers had created the idea of America as a country for religious freedom and self-governance.

I have quoted John Winthrop's words more than once on the campaign trail this year—for I believe that Americans in 1980 are every bit as committed to that vision of a shining city on a hill, as were those long ago settlers ... These visitors to that city on the Potomac do not come as white or black, red or yellow; they are not Jews or Christians; conservatives or liberals; or Democrats or Republicans. They are Americans awed by what has gone before, proud of what for them is still… a shining city on a hill.

Reagan would reference this concept through multiple speeches; notably again in his January 11, 1989, farewell speech to the nation:

I've spoken of the shining city all my political life, but I don't know if I ever quite communicated what I saw when I said it. But in my mind it was a tall, proud city built on rocks stronger than oceans, wind-swept, God-blessed, and teeming with people of all kinds living in harmony and peace; a city with free ports that hummed with commerce and creativity. And if there had to be city walls, the walls had doors and the doors were open to anyone with the will and the heart to get here. That's how I saw it, and see it still.

Mario Cuomo contrasted it with A Tale of Two Cities in his address to the 1984 Democratic National Convention.

There is despair, Mr. President, in the faces that you don't see, in the places that you don't visit in your shining city. In fact, Mr. President, this is a nation—Mr. President you ought to know that this nation is more "A Tale of Two Cities" than it is just a "Shining City on a Hill."

=== 21st century ===
Barack Obama, as a U.S. Senator, made reference to the topic in his commencement address on 2 June 2006, at the University of Massachusetts Boston:

It was right here, in the waters around us, where the American experiment began. As the earliest settlers arrived on the shores of Boston and Salem and Plymouth, they dreamed of building a City upon a Hill. And the world watched, waiting to see if this improbable idea called America would succeed. More than half of you represent the very first member of your family to ever attend college. In the most diverse university in all of New England, I look out at a sea of faces that are African-American and Hispanic-American and Asian-American and Arab-American. I see students that have come here from over 100 different countries, believing like those first settlers that they too could find a home in this City on a Hill—that they too could find success in this unlikeliest of places.

In 2016, Mitt Romney, the Republican nominee in the 2012 election, incorporated the idiom into a condemnation of Donald Trump's 2016 presidential campaign:

His domestic policies would lead to recession; his foreign policies would make America and the world less safe. He has neither the temperament nor the judgment to be president, and his personal qualities would mean that America would cease to be a shining city on a hill.

During the 2016 presidential race, Texas Senator Ted Cruz used the phrase during his speech announcing the suspension of his campaign. President Barack Obama also alluded to President Ronald Reagan's use of the phrase, during his speech at the Democratic National Convention the same year, as he proposed a vision of America in contrast to that of Republican presidential candidate Donald Trump.

In 2017, former FBI director James Comey used the phrase in testimony before the Senate Intelligence Committee on the investigation into Russian interference in the 2016 U.S. presidential election:

[W]e have this big, messy, wonderful country where we fight with each other all the time, but nobody tells us what to think, what to fight about, what to vote for, except other Americans, and that's wonderful and often painful. But we're talking about a foreign government that ... tried to shape the way we think, we vote, we act. ... [They]'re going to try to run it down and dirty it up as much as possible. That's what this is about. And they will be back, because we remain — as difficult as we can be with each other, we remain that shining city on the hill, and they don't like it.

On November 10, 2020, Secretary of State Mike Pompeo used the phrase while delivering an address at the inauguration of the Ronald Reagan Institute Center for Freedom and Democracy.

But I am equally confident that America will overcome any challenge, from Communist China to the terrorist regime in Tehran. Because that’s what free people do. We come together; we solve problems; we win, they lose; and we execute our foreign policy confident that we are that shining city on a hill.

Chair Bennie Thompson, of the United States House Select Committee on the January 6 Attack, used the phrase in his opening remarks on the first day of hearing on June 9, 2022.

== Use in Australian politics ==
In Australian politics, the similar phrase "the light on the hill" was famously used in a 1949 conference speech by Prime Minister Ben Chifley, and as a consequence this phrase is used to describe the objective of the Australian Labor Party. It has often been referenced by both journalists and political leaders in that context since this time.

== Use in hymns ==
The phrase is used in "Now, Saviour now, Thy Love Impart", a hymn written by Charles Wesley.

== See also ==
- American civil religion
- American Dream
- American exceptionalism
- British Israelism
- Christian Dominionism
- Christian Zionism
- Empire of Liberty
- Manifest destiny
- Replacement theology
- Safed in Israel, considered by some to have been the city Jesus had in mind
- Boston in Massachusetts, often nicknamed the "city on a hill", and named as such by the Puritans, in particular John Winthrop
- Scofield Bible
- Speeches and debates of Ronald Reagan
- The New Colossus
