= Salt of the earth =

Salt of the earth is a phrase used by Jesus in the Sermon on the Mount, part of a discourse on salt and light.

Salt of the earth may also refer to:

== Film ==
- Salt of the Earth (1954 film), an American drama film
- Salt of the Earth: Palestinian Christians in the Northern West Bank, a 2004 American documentary film
- The Salt of the Earth (2014 film), a French-Brazilian-Italian biographical documentary film

== Music ==
- Salt of the Earth (The Soul Searchers album), 1974
- Salt of the Earth (Ricky Skaggs & The Whites album), 2007
- Salt of the Earth (EP), a 2008 EP by Texas in July
- "Salt of the Earth" (song), a 1968 song by the Rolling Stones

== Other uses ==
- Salt of the Earth, a 1996 book by Pope Benedict XVI
- Empire Zinc strike, also known as the Salt of the Earth strike, a 1950–1952 American miners' strike

== See also ==
- Salting the earth, the ritual of spreading salt on the sites of cities razed by conquerors
