= Matthew 5:14 =

- ← 5:13 5:15 →
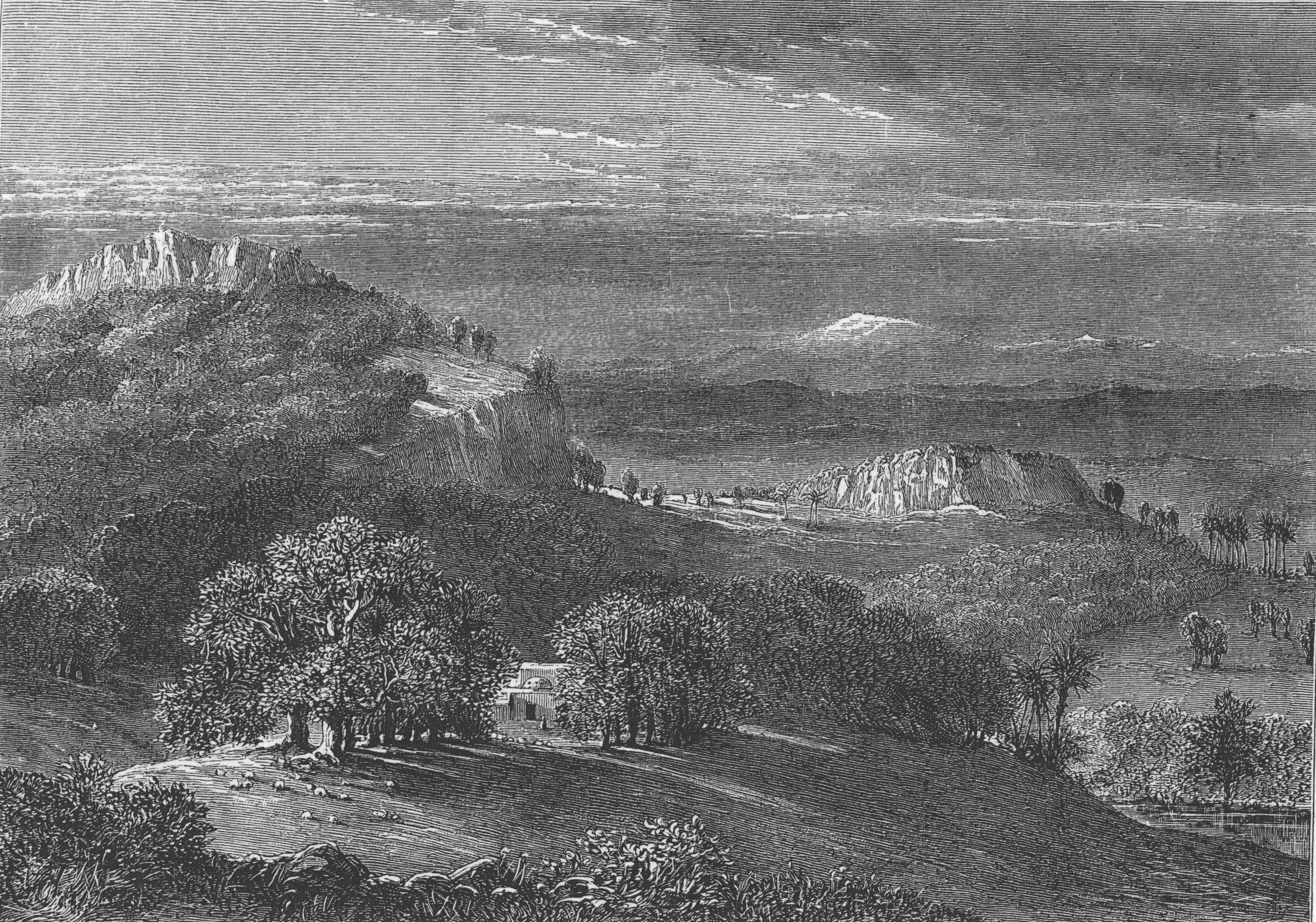
- "Sermon on the Mount", painted by Alexander Bida in 1874.
- Book: Gospel of Matthew
- Christian Bible part: New Testament

Matthew 5:14 is the fourteenth verse of the fifth chapter of the Gospel of Matthew in the New Testament. It is part of the Sermon on the Mount, and is one of a series of metaphors immediately following the Beatitudes.

== Content ==
In the King James Version of the Bible the text reads:

Ye are the light of the world. A city
that is set on an hill cannot be hid.

The World English Bible translates the passage as:

You are the light of the world. A city
located on a hill can't be hidden.

The Novum Testamentum Graece text is:

Ὑμεῖς ἐστε τὸ φῶς τοῦ κόσμου
οὐ δύναται πόλις κρυβῆναι ἐπάνω ὄρους κειμένη

For a collection of other versions see BibleHub Matthew 5:14.

== Analysis ==
This verse has a fairly sudden shift of metaphor from "salt of the earth" to "city on a hill". It may be related to the expression "salt and light", which was then used to describe the Law. This verse is unparalleled elsewhere in the New Testament, but a version of it is found in the apocryphal Gospel of Thomas. In Thomas the focus of the verse is on the city's security and impregnability rather than its symbolism. Gundry notes that at this time cities would frequently have been located on hills for defensive reasons. Schweizer notes that this might be a reference to Mount Zion at the start of Isaiah 2. Scholars are divided on whether this is a specific reference to the idea of a New Jerusalem. Albright and Mann note that Cicero described Rome as light to the world, but that it is unlikely that this verse borrows from him. See also Isaiah 42:6, 49:6, 60:3.

This scripture was cited at the end of John Winthrop's lecture or treatise, A Model of Christian Charity; it served as a warning to his fellow Puritan settlers of Boston in 1630 that God and their enemies would be watching, if they failed to uphold their covenant: "we shall be as a city upon a hill, the eyes of all people are upon us." President Ronald Reagan frequently invoked Winthrop's words as the very birth of America's destiny as the exceptional nation of the world, misquoting Winthrop.

Along with Matthew 5:13, this verse became the theme of World Youth Day 2002: "You are the salt of the earth ... you are the light of the world".

== Commentary from the Church Fathers ==
Hilary of Poitiers: It is the nature of a light to emit its rays whithersoever it is carried about, and when brought into a house to dispel the darkness of that house. Thus the world, placed beyond the pale of the knowledge of God, was held in the darkness of ignorance, till the light of knowledge was brought to it by the Apostles, and thenceforward the knowledge of God shone bright, and from their small bodies, whithersoever they went about, light is ministered to the darkness.

Saint Remigius: For as the sun sends forth his beams, so the Lord, the Sun of righteousness, sent forth his Apostles to dispel the night of the human race.

Chrysostom: Mark how great His promise to them, men who were scarce known in their own country that the fame of them should reach to the ends of the earth. The persecutions which He had foretold, were not able to dim their light, yea they made it but more conspicuous.

Jerome: He instructs them what should be the boldness of their preaching, that as Apostles they should not be hidden through fear, like lamps under a corn-measure, but should stand forth with all confidence, and what they have heard in the secret chambers, that declare upon the house tops.

Chrysostom: Thus showing them that they ought to be careful of their own walk and conversation, seeing they were set in the eyes of all, like a city on a hill, or a lamp on a stand.

Pseudo-Chrysostom: This city is the Church of which it is said, Glorious things are spoken of thee, thou city of God. (Ps. 87:3.) Its citizens are all the faithful, of whom the Apostle speaks, Ye are fellow-citizens of the saints. (Eph. 2:19.) It is built upon Christ the hill, of whom Daniel thus, A stone hewed without hands (Dan. 2:34.) became a great mountain.

Augustine: Or, the mountain is the great righteousness, which is signified by the mountain from which the Lord is now teaching.

Pseudo-Chrysostom: A city set on a hill cannot be hidden though it would; the mountain which bears makes it to be seen of all men; so the Apostles and Priests who are founded on Christ cannot be hidden even though they would, because Christ makes them manifest.

Hilary of Poitiers: Or, the city signifies the flesh which He had taken on Him; because that in Him by this assumption of human nature, there was as it were a collection of the human race, and we by partaking in His flesh become inhabitants of that city. He cannot therefore be hid, because being set in the height of God's power, He is offered to be contemplated of all men in admiration of his works.

Pseudo-Chrysostom: How Christ manifests His saints, suffering them not to be hid, He shows by another comparison, adding, Neither do men light a lamp to put it under a corn-measure, but on a stand.

Chrysostom: Or, in the illustration of the city, He signified His own power, by the lamp He exhorts the Apostles to preach with boldness; as though He said, ‘I indeed have lighted the lamp, but that it continue to burn will be your care, not for your own sakes only, but both for others who shall receive its light and for God’s glory.’

== See also ==
- City upon a Hill
- Lamp under a bushel
- Light of the World
- Salt and Light

Preceded by Matthew 5:13	Gospel of Matthew; Chapter 5	Succeeded by Matthew 5:15
