= Covenant of salt =

Arrangement in the Bible

A covenant of salt was a cultural practice in the ancient world in which one party would form a covenant by eating the salt of the other. Usually the party with the greater power or authority provided the salt. Salt was seen as extremely vital for life, so much so that among many cultures, it was thought to be the vital substance in the blood itself that made things alive. Thus, eating someone else's salt was seen as equally significant to drinking their blood, a variation of the idea of blood brothers, in which two people are thought to symbolically share in a common source of life by exchanging blood, as if the two lives had become one. The two parties involved in the covenant were bound by this sacred rite to be loyal to each other for life, ensuring that they do not harm one another, and look out for the other's interests.

In the ancient Near East, salt was almost always an ingredient of bread. Thus eating bread with another person was a simple and common method of sharing salt in a meal, and was for all intents and purposes synonymous with making a covenant of salt.

== In the Bible ==
The phrase covenant of salt (Hebrew: ברית מלח, romanized: bərîṯ melaḥ) appears twice in the Hebrew Bible:

In the Book of Numbers, God's priestly covenant with the Aaronic priesthood is said to be a covenant of salt. In the second book of Chronicles, God's covenant with the Davidic kings of Israel is also described as a covenant of salt.

The commandments regarding grain offerings in the Book of Leviticus state "every offering of your grain offering you shall season with salt; you shall not allow the salt of the covenant of your God to be lacking from your grain offering. With all your offerings you shall offer salt."

Although these are the only explicit mentions of the covenant of salt in the Bible, there are other verses which possibly allude to it.

In Ezra 4, Rehum the commander and Shimshai the scribe write a letter to the king of Persia to try to stop the construction of the second temple. In verse 14 they write "Now because we receive support from the palace, it was not proper for us to see the king’s dishonor; therefore we have sent and informed the king". A more literal translation of the phrase 'we receive support' is 'we eat salt', indicating an obligation of loyalty to the king to look out for his best interests, since they ate his salt.

In 1 Sam 18:3, David and Jonathan make a covenant. Though the text never explicitly states it, it might have been a covenant of salt, established by eating bread together. In 2 Sam 9:10, David shows kindness to Mephibosheth by letting him always eat bread at his table. Psalm 41:9 describes the hurt that the psalmist had received from their trusted friend, indicating that he had eaten of his bread.

== See also ==
- Bread and salt
