= Conservative Christianity =

Form of Christianity

Conservative Christianity, also known as conservative theology, theological conservatism, traditional Christianity, or biblical orthodoxy is a grouping of overlapping and denominationally diverse theological movements within Christianity that seeks to retain the orthodox and long-standing traditions and beliefs of Christianity. It is contrasted with Liberal Christianity and Progressive Christianity, which are seen as heretical heterodoxies by theological conservatives.

Conservative Christianity should not be mistaken as being necessarily synonymous with political conservatism, nor the Christian right, which is a political movement of Christians that support politically conservative ideologies and policies within the realm of politics.

== Theological conservatism across denominations ==
Theological conservatism is found in Roman Catholicism, Eastern Orthodoxy, Oriental Orthodoxy, Protestantism, the Church of the East, Old Catholicism, and throughout all of Mainstream-Nicene Christianity in both Western Christian and Eastern Christian traditions. Within Protestantism, it is largely made up of Evangelical Christianity and Christian Fundamentalism, while the Confessing Movement, Confessionalism, and to an extent Neo-orthodoxy make up the remaining; in Roman Catholicism it is inclusive of Catholics that adhere to Traditionalist Catholicism as well as the Magisterium, Scriptures, and Traditions of the Church at the exclusion of Catholic Modernism and Folk Catholicism; and in Old Catholicism it currently includes the Union of Scranton, those of similar beliefs, and historically the Union of Utrecht until its adoption of theological liberalism. In spite of this, not every community has had a direct connection with the Fundamentalist–Modernist controversy.

== Issues with definition ==
Sociologists and historians distinguish theological conservatism—centered on adherence to historic creeds, biblical authority, and supernatural orthodoxy—from political conservatism that may be influenced by orthodox Christian teachings or values. Theological conservatism encompasses several distinct sub-groups, including Evangelicalism, Fundamentalism, and confessionalism. They typically affirm the historical reality of miracles, the bodily resurrection, and a high view of biblical authority and inerrancy.

Evangelical leaders like Tony Perkins of the Family Research Council have called attention to the problem of equating the term Christian right with theological conservatism and Evangelicalism. Although evangelicals constitute the core constituency of the political movement, Christian right within the United States, not all evangelicals fit that political description.

The problem of describing the Christian right which in most cases is conflated with theological conservatism in secular media, is further complicated by the fact that the label religious conservative or conservative Christian applies to other Christian denominational religious groups who are theologically, socially, and culturally conservative but do not have overtly political organizations associated with them, which are usually uninvolved, uninterested, apathetic, or indifferent towards politics.

Tim Keller, an Evangelical theologian and Presbyterian Church in America pastor, shows that Conservative Christianity (theology) predates the Christian right (politics), and that being a theological conservative didn't necessitate being a political conservative, that some political progressive views around economics, helping the poor, the redistribution of wealth, and racial diversity are compatible with theologically conservative Christianity. Rod Dreher, a senior editor for The American Conservative, a secular conservative magazine, also argues the same differences, even claiming that a "traditional Christian" a theological conservative, can simultaneously be left on economics (economic progressive) and even a socialist at that while maintaining traditional Christian beliefs. While theologically conservative Christians in regions such as the United States frequently align with conservative political parties, theological conservatism is defined primarily by doctrinal commitments rather than partisan affiliation, and it encompasses diverse political and socioeconomic perspectives around the globe.

== General beliefs ==
Theological conservatism across Christian traditions is grounded in adherence to historic Christian orthodoxy as expressed in the ecumenical creeds, affirming the supernatural reality of God's redemptive acts in history. While specific denominational teachings differ, conservative Christians share core convictions regarding theology proper, the fallen condition of humanity, the nature of biblical revelation, and the moral order of Christian life.

=== Theology proper and Christology ===
At the center of conservative Christian theology is the glory, sovereignty, and holiness of God, alongside the historic Trinitarian confession of one God in three co-equal persons: Father, Son, and Holy Spirit. Conservative Christianity maintains a "high Christology," accepting Jesus Christ as He presented Himself in the canonical Gospels—both fully God and fully man, born of a virgin, living a sinless life, and performing literal miracles. The bodily resurrection of Christ is regarded as the central and pivotal historical event of human history, accompanied by the affirmation of His bodily ascension, His literal physical second coming (parousia), and the final judgment resulting in an eternal literal Heaven and Hell (with Purgatory affirmed in Catholic tradition).

A central tenet of conservative Christianity is the exclusive and irreplaceable role of Jesus Christ in salvation and reconciliation with God (Solus Christus). Grounded in apostolic declarations such as Peter's proclamation in Acts 4:12 ("there is no other name under heaven... by which we must be saved") and Jesus' self-testimony in John 14:6, salvation is seen as rooted solely in Christ's finished work on the cross. Historically, this doctrine became a primary theological dispute regarding the intercession of saints, the treasury of merit, and the boundaries of Christian prayer. Since the Second Council of Nicaea (787) and medieval scholasticism, Catholic theology has distinguished between the supreme worship owed to God alone (latria) and the venerative honor accorded to holy creatures and saints (dulia). Protestant reformers were fully cognizant of this scholastic distinction, but explicitly rejected it as a semantic rationalization that failed in practical devotion. Reformers such as John Calvin in the Institutes of the Christian Religion and Philipp Melanchthon in the Apology of the Augsburg Confession argued that petitioning deceased saints for protection, healing, or spiritual merit in practice ascribes divine attributes—such as omnipresence, omniscience, and the dispensing of grace—to mere creatures. The reformers pointed to apostolic patterns in the Book of Acts—most notably Acts 3:12, where the Apostles Peter and John explicitly rebuke the crowd for assuming that their "own power or godliness" had caused the lame man to walk, alongside the apostolic refusal of prostration and creaturely veneration (Acts 10:25–26, 14:14–15)—as an unyielding scriptural boundary against attributing divine efficacy or redemptive merit to human sanctity. Consequently, conservative Protestant confessions formulated Solus Christus not as a novel denial, but as a simplifying, boundary-setting resolution intended to rein in post-apostolic devotional developments and restore Christ as the sole mediator between God and humanity (1 Timothy 2:5).

Conversely, Traditionalist Catholicism and Eastern Orthodoxy uphold the invocation of saints and veneration of relics as an unbroken apostolic expression of the communion of saints, maintaining that honoring the reflection of Christ in His saints directs ultimate praise back to God. Historic Roman Catholic conciliar decrees—most notably the 25th session of the Council of Trent—and modern magisterial teachings (such as the Second Vatican Council's Lumen gentium) explicitly acknowledge the persistent risk of popular excess, condemning superstitious abuses that would blur the distinction between creaturely veneration and divine adoration, and dogmatically reaffirming that all intercessory grace derives exclusively from the singular, unrepeatable mediation of Christ. However, conservative Protestant scholars of Roman Catholicism contend that these modern cautionary statements and ecumenical formulations do not represent a genuine doctrinal correction or retreat from post-Reformation dogma. Theologians such as Leonardo De Chirico and Gregg Allison argue that Roman Catholicism operates as an organic theological system guided by an et–et ("both-and") architecture, in which post-conciliar Christocentric language merely overlays rather than replaces Tridentine dogmas, the treasury of merit, and creaturely co-mediation. In this view, Protestant observers who perceive fundamental reform misunderstand Rome's cumulative hermeneutic, which assimilates contemporary terminology while leaving the underlying sacramental and mediatorial framework intact.

In Eastern Orthodoxy, the veneration of saints and holy icons (Greek: proskynesis) is defended not as a secondary ecclesiastical concession, but as a direct theological corollary of the Incarnation. Developed during the Byzantine Iconoclasm debates over biblical prohibitions of images (Exodus 20:4–5), theologians such as John of Damascus affirmed that because the Son of God became truly visible in the flesh, matter had been sanctified, meaning that veneration directed toward an icon or saint passes directly to the divine Prototype. This distinction was affirmed at the Second Council of Nicaea (787). Conservative Protestants, by contrast, reject the claim that conciliar decrees or incarnational analogies legitimize creaturely veneration, maintaining that human ecclesiastical assemblies cannot override the explicit scriptural boundary against prostration before images or invoking created beings. From the conservative Protestant perspective, recurring historical controversies and popular excesses surrounding miraculous icons—such as the social strife culminating in the Moscow plague riot of 1771 over the cordoning of a reputed miracle-working icon—demonstrate the persistent spiritual peril of departing from the strict biblical pattern of *Solus Christus* and apostolic injunctions such as Acts 3:12 and 1 Timothy 2:5.

=== Theological anthropology: human fallenness and original sin ===
A foundational conviction distinguishing conservative Christianity from theological liberalism is its doctrine of humanity (theological anthropology) and original sin. While affirming that human beings are created in the image of God (imago Dei) with inherent dignity and moral accountability, conservative theology emphasizes the catastrophic effects of the Fall of man. Humanity is regarded as universally fallen, morally guilty before a holy God, and incapable of spiritual self-redemption through unaided ethical progress, education, or social reform.

In his seminal 1923 defense of theological orthodoxy, Christianity and Liberalism, Presbyterian theologian J. Gresham Machen argued that the root division between historic Christianity and modern liberal theology was anthropological: whereas liberalism maintained an optimistic confidence in unaided human nature and treated sin as an imperfection to be overcome through moral imitation of Jesus, historic Christianity began with a profound consciousness of human guilt and helplessness:

From the beginning Christianity was the religion of the broken heart; it is based upon the conviction that there is an awful gulf between man and God which none but God can bridge.

— J. Gresham Machen, Christianity and Liberalism (1923), p. 65

Across conservative traditions, this anthropological baseline underpins the absolute necessity of the cross, substitutionary atonement, and supernatural grace. In confessional Protestantism, this is expressed through the doctrine of total depravity or radical moral inability, which asserts that the Fall corrupted every aspect of human nature—mind, will, and affections—leaving humanity spiritually dead and entirely dependent upon sovereign divine grace for regeneration prior to faith. To counter common misconceptions, conservative theologians such as R. C. Sproul emphasize that total depravity does not mean "utter depravity"—that fallen people are as wicked as they could possibly be—nor does it imply the eradication or annulment of the imago Dei. Rather, while the divine image has been severely fractured, marred, and distorted, human beings remain genuine image-bearers of God with inherent dignity, rationality, and the capacity for civic good under common grace (Genesis 9:6). Preferring the term "radical corruption" (from the Latin radix, meaning root), Sproul clarified that the doctrine describes the universal extent of sin reaching into the core of every faculty, resulting in an inability to love or seek God without the regenerating grace of the Holy Spirit. Similarly, in Catholic theology and Eastern Orthodoxy, original sin (peccatum originale) is understood as the loss of original justice and sanctifying grace, resulting in a wounded nature subject to concupiscence and death, which cannot be justified or healed without the supernatural grace of Christ. Conservative theologians emphasize that without an acute recognition of this holy gulf and the reality of divine judgment against sin, the Christian gospel ceases to be Good News of redemption and is reduced to moralistic instruction—a tendency famously critiqued by theologian H. Richard Niebuhr as describing a religion where "a God without wrath brought men without sin into a kingdom without judgment through the ministrations of a Christ without a cross."

=== Bibliology and hermeneutics: the source of truth ===
Conservative theology holds to the ontological uniqueness and divine authority of the Bible. While recognizing human authorship and historical settings, conservative Christians affirm that Scripture is God's direct self-disclosure ("God-breathed" or theopneustos), making it qualitatively distinct from all other literature and ecclesiastical writings. The divine origin of the text grounds both its supreme authority and its sufficiency: conservative theologians assert that God possesses the sovereign capability to communicate His truth adequately to humanity, and that human fallibility in interpretation does not render God's revelation insufficient or inherently deficient.

While conservative Christians generally adhere to the historical-grammatical and literal sense of Scripture, internal hermeneutical distinctions exist within the movement. Extreme sectarian positions, such as King James Onlyism, are broadly rejected by mainstream conservative and evangelical biblical scholars as lacking historical and textual foundation. Similarly, while the historical reality of the creation account in Genesis is universally upheld against secular materialism, conservative theologians remain divided over the age of the Earth: Young Earth creationism (affirming literal 24-hour creation days) and Old Earth creationism (including progressive creationism and the framework hypothesis) both operate within conservative inerrantist frameworks, with ongoing scholarly debate regarding whether non-literal readings of Genesis 1 imply a compromise with naturalistic hermeneutics.

A defining cross-denominational hallmark of conservative Christianity is its resistance to naturalistic applications of the historical-critical method ("higher criticism"). Conservative critics object to diachronic methodologies—including source criticism (such as the Documentary hypothesis dividing the Pentateuch into J, E, D, and P strands), form criticism (disassembling texts into isolated oral units and hypothesized Sitz im Leben), and redaction criticism—when these methods treat the biblical text primarily as a fragmented human compilation with a long evolutionary prehistory. From the conservative perspective, such approaches dismantle the narrative and theological unity of Scripture as an inspired canon, shaving away supernatural elements and historical veracity until only a minimal historical core remains.

This critique spans both conservative Protestant and Catholic traditionalist traditions. In conservative evangelicalism, the 1978 Chicago Statement on Biblical Inerrancy addressed these philosophical presuppositions, warning against Enlightenment agnosticism and rationalism that seep into biblical studies and treat Scripture with skepticism. In Roman Catholicism, nineteenth- and twentieth-century papal encyclicals—most notably Pope Leo XIII's Providentissimus Deus (1893), Pope Pius X's anti-modernist encyclical Pascendi dominici gregis (1907), and Pope Benedict XV's Spiritus Paraclitus (1920)—strictly condemned rationalist exegesis that excludes the supernatural, denies biblical inerrancy, or treats sacred writers as merely fallible human authors. While the Second Vatican Council's constitution Dei verbum (1965) and the 1993 Pontifical Biblical Commission document The Interpretation of the Bible in the Church affirmed historical criticism as an "indispensable" tool when properly subordinated to the faith of the Church, Traditionalist Catholics (including the Society of Saint Pius X) explicitly reject post-conciliar critical exegesis, arguing that it capitulates to the modernism condemned by Pius X. Similarly, Cardinal Joseph Ratzinger in his 1988 Erasmus Lecture argued that while historical investigation is necessary for an incarnational faith, an isolated diachronic exegesis produces a hermeneutical crisis by dissecting the text into historical hypotheticals rather than reading the Bible as a living, unified theological canon.

=== Ethics, ecclesial order, and worship ===
Conservative Christianity views personal holiness, moral obedience, and sanctification as non-negotiable dimensions of the Christian calling, demanding conscious separation from secular ideological conformity. This includes adherence to historic Christian moral theology regarding the sanctity of human life from conception and traditional sexual ethics affirming marriage exclusively as a lifelong covenant between one man and one woman. For theological conservatives, historic moral standards are not regarded as peripheral social matters or secondary issues (adiaphora), but as intrinsically bound to the authority of Scripture and the integrity of the gospel. Consequently, departures from historic Christian ethics in mainline denominations have frequently precipitated conservative protest, impaired communion, and escalated structural schism. A prominent example occurred in June 2002, when the Synod of the Anglican Diocese of New Westminster in Canada authorized a rite for blessing same-sex unions; evangelical theologian J. I. Packer and orthodox delegates staged a historic walkout, breaking communion with the synod. Explaining his decision, Packer stated:

Because this decision, taken in its context, falsifies the gospel of Christ, abandons the authority of Scripture, jeopardizes the salvation of fellow human beings, and betrays the church in its God-appointed role as the bastion and bulwark of divine truth.

— J. I. Packer, "Why I Walked", Christianity Today (2003)

This principled resistance to revisions in sexual ethics contributed to the broader Anglican realignment and the formation of alternative traditional bodies, such as the Anglican Church in North America (ACNA) and the global GAFCON movement.

In ecclesial governance and family life, conservative Christianity overwhelmingly affirms traditional, complementary gender roles (often termed complementarianism in Protestantism). Rooted in apostolic passages regarding creation order (such as 1 Corinthians 11:3 and 1 Timothy 2:12–14), conservative Christians affirm male headship in the home and restrict ordained spiritual authority—pastoral office and eldership in Protestantism, and the sacerdotal priesthood and episcopate in Roman Catholicism and Eastern Orthodoxy—strictly to men. At the same time, conservative theologians distinguish between binding doctrinal requirements of ecclesial authority and secondary cultural or ascetical practices: while practices such as Christian headcovering are retained among traditionalist Catholics (the chapel veil or mantilla) and conservative Anabaptists (such as the Amish and conservative Mennonites), modern attempts to mandate headcoverings across broader evangelical and conservative Protestant communities are generally seen as non-binding cultural customs or cautioned against as legalism.

In liturgical and devotional practice, conservative Christianity upholds high theological and aesthetic standards for hymnody and corporate worship. In confessional Reformed and Presbyterian traditions, corporate worship is anchored in the regulative principle of worship—the conviction that public worship must be instituted and warranted solely by Scripture, rejecting human innovations, theatrical display, and commercial entertainment styles. Operating from this framework, conservative critics express concern over trends in Contemporary worship music (CWM) that prioritize emotional stimulation, subjective individualism, and repetitive choruses over doctrinal depth. Conservative hymnologists and pastors advocate for music that is covenantal, scripturally saturated, and centered on the promises, majesty, and objective attributes of God, warning against the sentimental or romanticized lyrical tropes (often critically referred to as "Jesus-as-boyfriend" songs) that blur the distinction between holy adoration and romantic affection. At the same time, conservative and Reformed theologians distinguish between the regulatory boundaries of corporate Sunday worship and everyday cultural recreation or evangelism: under the principles of Christian liberty and common grace, conservative Christians do not proscribe contemporary musical genres outside the gathered assembly, with artists utilizing popular idioms—such as the classic rock parodies of ApologetiX for apologetics, the theological rhyme schemes and "lyrical theology" of Reformed Christian hip hop artists like Shai Linne, or themes within Christian metal and power metal—to communicate biblical orthodoxy in the cultural sphere while maintaining that public worship demands distinct liturgical sobriety. In parallel, Traditionalist Catholics emphasize the preservation of Gregorian chant and sacred polyphony—in accordance with Pope Pius X's motu proprio Tra le sollecitudini (1903) and the Second Vatican Council's *Sacrosanctum Concilium*—as vehicles of sacred transcendence, contrasting traditional liturgical reverence with modern folk and pop liturgical adaptations. Similarly, Eastern Orthodoxy maintains a strict, word-centered (logogenic) musical discipline: traditional liturgical worship is exclusively a cappella, barring mechanical musical instruments based on the patristic conviction that the human voice alone is the sanctified instrument for prayer. Within conservative and traditional Orthodox practice, liturgical singing is anchored in unaccompanied chant—such as Byzantine chant or the Slavic Znamenny chant and synodal traditions—frequently led by male-only monastic choirs or tonsured cantors, emphasizing ascetic sobriety, hierarchical order, and doctrinal solemnity while rejecting theatrical or entertainment-driven musical styles.

== Component movements ==
It may specifically refer to movements such as:

- Christian fundamentalism, a movement within Protestantism upholding biblical literalism.
- Evangelicalism, worldwide interdenominational movement within Protestant Christianity that affirms the centrality of being "born again" in which an individual experiences personal conversion as well as the biblical inerrancy.
  - Conservative evangelicalism in the United Kingdom, a theological movement within evangelical Protestant Christianity
- The Confessing Movement, an evangelical and/or confessional movement within several mainline Protestant denominations
- A few scholars label Roman Catholics who reject Liberal Christianity, Progressive Christianity, and Catholic Modernism in favor of more traditional doctrines as fundamentalists.
  - Catholics who are faithful to the teachings of the Magisterium (the teaching authority of the Catholic Church) as well as the Scriptures and Traditions of the Church, can be considered theological conservatives in certain respects (if conservative means "according to the central moral and theological teachings historically accepted by the majority of Christendom [Christianity]")
  - The Traditionalist Catholic movement, Roman Catholics who believe that the Catholic Church has strayed from its doctrine since the Second Vatican Council.
- The Union of Scranton within the Old Catholic Church.
- Confessionalism (religion), a belief in the importance of full and unambiguous assent to the whole of a religious teaching
  - Confessional Lutheranism, a designation for Lutherans or Lutheran groups who believe in the doctrines taught in the Book of Concord of 1580, which is a summary of the teachings found in Scripture, requires attention to how that faith is actually being preached, taught, and put into practice.
- Theologically Conservative Christian views on Homosexuality.
- Neo-orthodoxy, a theological movement developed in the aftermath of the First World War as a reaction against doctrines of 19th-century liberal theology and a reevaluation of the teachings of the Reformation.

== See also ==
- Christian fundamentalism
- Moderate Christianity
- Liberal Christianity
- Progressive Christianity
