= Child preacher =

Type of Christian preacher

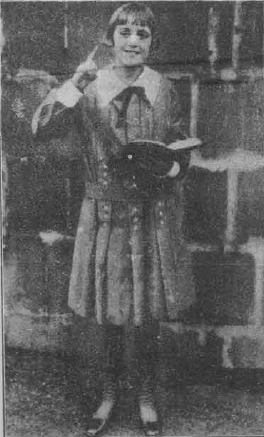
Child preacher Uldine Utley, aged about 12

In some branches of Christianity, especially American pentecostalism, children are occasionally preachers, or even ordained ministers. The heyday of child preachers was in the 1920s and 1930s, but a number of videos of modern-day child preachers can be seen on YouTube.

One of the most prominent child preachers was Marjoe Gortner, who was the subject of the 1972 documentary Marjoe.

According to Randall Balmer, the appeal of having child preachers is in its novelty, making it "a kind of a carnival side-show".

In 2012, when he was 11 years old, Ezekiel Stoddard was ordained as a minister in his family's non-denominational Fullness of Time Church, in Maryland.

In 2011, National Geographic aired a documentary that featured a four-year-old preacher in the United Pentecostal Church International.

Ester Souza is a child preacher, aged 8 in 2025, with 2 million social media followers according to the Washington Post.

== See also ==
- Duffey Strode
- Vance Havner
- Preacher's kid
