= The Fundamentals =

Set of essays defending Protestant beliefs

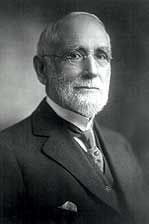
Lyman Stewart (1840-1923) began the project

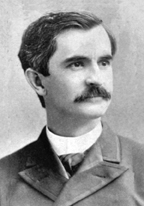
The first editor, A. C. Dixon (1854-1925)

The Fundamentals: A Testimony To The Truth (generally referred to simply as The Fundamentals) is a set of ninety essays on Christianity published between 1910 and 1915 by the Testimony Publishing Company of Chicago. It was initially published quarterly in twelve volumes, then republished in 1917 by the Bible Institute of Los Angeles as a four-volume set. Baker Books reprinted all four volumes under two covers in 2003.

== History ==
The project was conceived and bankrolled in 1909 by California businessman and oil tycoon Lyman Stewart, the founder of Union Oil and a devout Presbyterian and dispensationalist, who had converted to Christianity during the "Businessman's Revival" of 1857. Stewart, along with his brother and business partner Milton Stewart, anonymously supported the composing, printing, and distributing the publication through the establishment of the Testimony Publishing Company. His original plan was simply to finance a 12 part monthly magazine for a year called the Testimony, in order to correct what he saw as erroneous Christian teachings among Christian workers like preachers, teachers, and missionaries, who Stewart said "do not know what they are teaching is error; they teach what they have been taught; they do not know any better."

The first editor and executive secretary was A. C. Dixon. Dixon was already well known as the pastor of the Moody Church in Chicago who vehemently opposed modernism, and was brother of the former Baptist preacher Thomas Dixon Jr., famous for his white supremest fiction such as The Clansman, later adapted into the film The Birth of a Nation. Stewart had chosen Dixon because of a sermon he had given attacking "one of the infidel professors in Chicago." Dixon, whose interests in fighting theological liberalism aligned with Stewart's, quickly agreed and declared it was "of the Lord," a sentiment with which Stewart agreed. He choose men from his evangelical network to assist him as an executive committee—R. A. Torrey, Elmore Harris, Louis Meyer, D. W. Potter, H. P. Crowell, and Thomas S. Smith—all of whom were aligned with the nondenominational evangelicalism inspired by Dwight L. Moody and a premillennial eschatology, as well as an opposition to theological liberalism. The committee persuaded Stewart to expand the one year project to five, to turn the final result into a book to make it more permanent, and to rename the project The Fundamentals. With Stewart's input they selected men "true to Christ and the Bible, and capable of doing the best possible work" drawn from their evangelical revivalist networks, as well as retrieving some previously published works. The initial volume was published in February 1910, only a few months after Stewart and Dixon's first meeting. The Stewart brothers were originally identified in the introduction simply as "two prominent Christian laymen" backing the project. It was mailed free of charge to ministers, missionaries, professors of theology, YMCA and YWCA secretaries, Sunday school superintendents, and other Protestant religious workers in the United States and other English-speaking countries. Over three million volumes (250,000 sets) were sent out.

Dixon resigned as executive secretary in 1911 preach at the Metropolitan Tabernacle in London, but only after the first five volumes had been released. Once Dixon left the project, he was followed as editor by Meyer from the executive committee, who died in 1913, and finally by Torrey. Throughout the project, the executive committee was careful to make sure that the resulting articles aligned with their theological outlook. The final product was 88 articles plus two editorials written by 64 writers and filling 12 volumes with a total of 1,434 pages. The initial response was much smaller than hoped, as both theological journals and popular religious magazines mostly ignored the The Fundamentals, but the long term effect was significant.

== Content ==
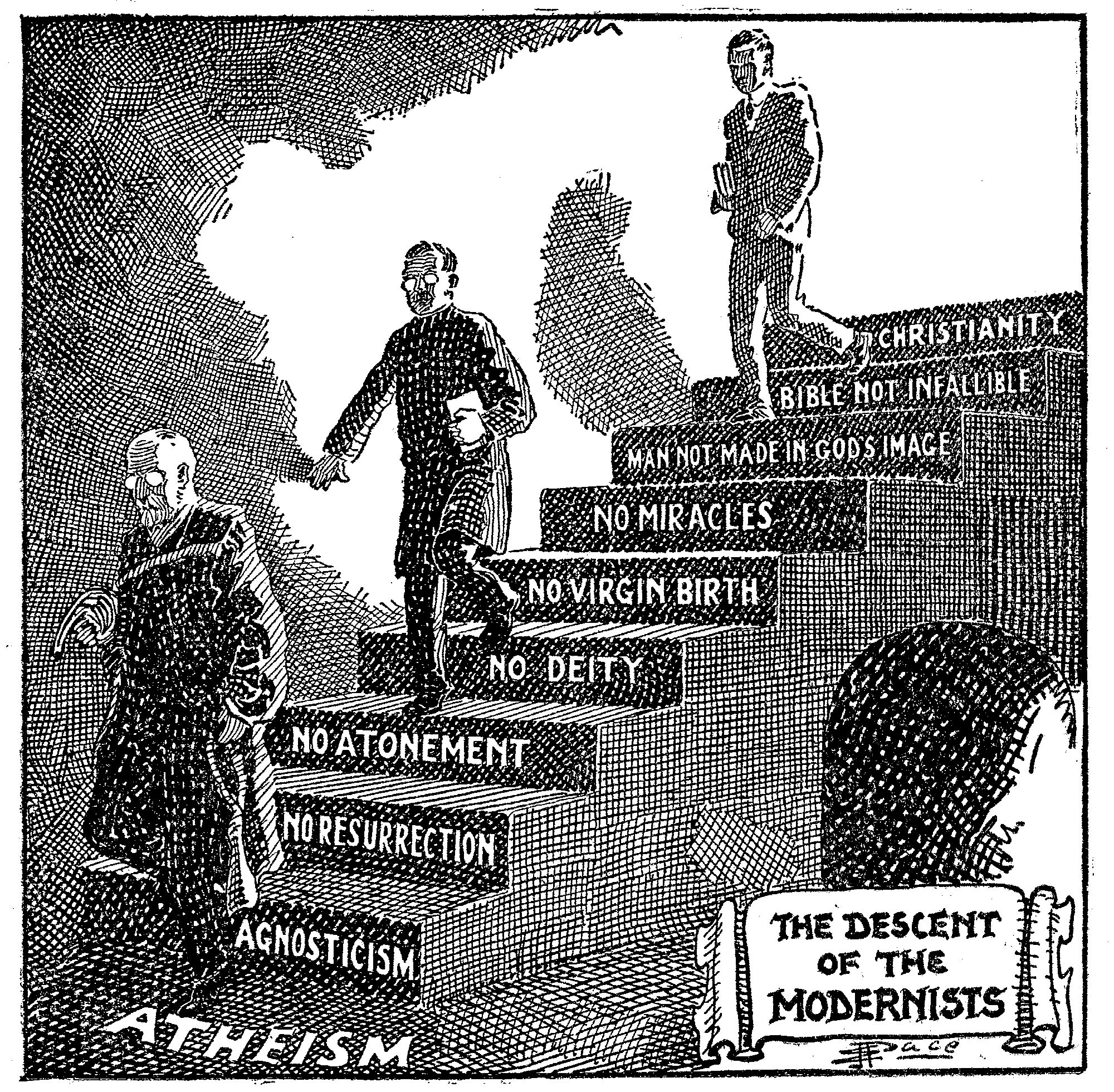
A fundamentalist cartoon by E. J. Pace from 1922 portraying higher criticism or modernism as the descent through many of the ideas The Fundamentals opposed

According to its foreword, the publication was designed to be "a new statement of the fundamentals of Christianity". Its contents reflect a concern with certain theological innovations related to liberal Christianity, especially biblical higher criticism, evolution, New Theology, and the Social Gospel. "True" science or criticism was acceptable, but "illegitimate" science or criticism, based on speculative hypotheses, was not. About a third of the essays defend the scriptures from liberal theology and higher criticism, while another third deal with theological questions, with the rest being miscellaneous articles. According to the essays, there are five essential elements of Christianity: literal Biblical inerrancy and infallibility; Jesus' virgin birth, sinless life, crucifixion, and physical resurrection; Jesus' divinity as the second person in the Trinity; substitutionary atonement; and Jesus' literal and physical second coming. Additional important beliefs included personal salvation from original sin, the link between unorthodox belief and immorality, the acceptance of creationism, and a proactive support of evangelism. The project was significantly influenced by the premillennial dispensationalist Keswick movement, but according to George Marsden, "they showed remarkable restraint in promoting the more controversial aspects of their views" in order to maintain a unified front against religious modernism. According to Geoffrey R. Treloar, their "ultimate objective was the transformation of Christianity" and thereby society.

Direct discussion of political causes, including prohibition, were generally avoided outside a few warnings about communism and anarchy, and a moderate essay on socialism which stated that the church should stay away from the topic, but that personal advocacy was acceptable. In addition, despite the rising popularity of Asian religions in the wake of the 1893 Parliament of the World's Religions, The Fundamentals largely ignored religions outside of Christianity with the exception of one article on spiritualism, and mostly reserved its criticism for what it considered to be deviant Christian sects. The editors heavily attacked what they saw as the greatest single threat to Protestant doctrines: the Roman Catholic Church, what they called "Romanism." According to Douglas E. Cowan, anti-Catholicism was "something of a cottage industry" among Protestants in the United States at the time, partially because of the significant number of immigrants coming to America from predominantly Catholic countries. Other Christian targets included Christian Science, Mormonism, and Millennial Dawn, also known as Russellites and later Jehovah's Witnesses. The final volume was devoted to evangelism and missionary work, and was intended to be a capstone of the project. A common theme throughout was the rejection of what it saw as an unscientific prejudice propagated by "illegitimate" science and higher criticism against miracles. It also argued that the "supreme proof" of God was the Christian's "own inner experience of the transforming power of his Lord upon the heart and life."

According to Marsden, some of the positions taken by authors were more moderate than future positions of the movement and show "that the trenches were not yet deeply dug for the coming fundamentalist battle." However, the essays in The Fundamentals are widely considered to be the foundation of modern Christian fundamentalism. Movements like the Christian countercult movement also grew out of The Fundamentals. The term "Fundamentalist" itself was coined in 1920 by Baptist minister Curtis Lee Laws to designate those Christians who engage in the "battle royal for The Fundamentals." The essays became a rallying point to unite anti-modernists, particularly in the Keswick movement.

== The Fundamentals essays ==
Arrangement of the original 12-volume set:

- Volume I:
  - The Virgin Birth of Christ - James Orr
  - The Deity of Christ - Benjamin B. Warfield
  - The Purposes of the Incarnation - G. Campbell Morgan
  - The Personality and Deity of the Holy Spirit - R. A. Torrey
  - The Proof of the Living God - Arthur T. Pierson
  - History of the Higher Criticism - Dyson Hague
  - A Personal Testimony - Howard A. Kelly
- Volume II:
  - The Testimony of the Monuments to the Truth of the Scriptures - George Frederick Wright
  - The Recent Testimony of Archaeology to the Scriptures - Melvin Grove Kyle
  - Fallacies of the Higher Criticism - Franklin Johnson
  - Christ and Criticism - Robert Anderson
  - Modern Philosophy - Philip Mauro
  - Justification by Faith - Handley Carr Glyn Moule
  - Tributes to Christ and the Bible by Brainy Men not Known as Active Christians
- Volume III:
  - Inspiration of the Bible—Definition, Extent, and Proof - James M. Gray
  - The Moral Glory of Jesus Christ a Proof of Inspiration - William G. Moorehead
  - God in Christ the Only Revelation of the Fatherhood of God - Robert E. Speer
  - The Testimony of Christian Experience - E. Y. Mullins
  - Christianity No Fable - Thomas Whitelaw
  - My Personal Experience with the Higher Criticism - James J. Reeve
  - The Personal Testimony of Charles T. Studd
- Volume IV:
  - The Tabernacle in the Wilderness: Did it Exist? - David Heagle
  - The Testimony of Christ to the Old Testament - William Caven
  - The Bible and Modern Criticism - F. Bettex
  - Science and Christian Faith - James Orr
  - A Personal Testimony - Philip Mauro
- Volume V:
  - Life in the Word - Philip Mauro
  - The Scriptures - A. C. Dixon
  - The Certainty and Importance of the Bodily Resurrection of Jesus Christ from the Dead - R. A. Torrey
  - Observations of the Conversion and Apostleship of St. Paul - Lord Lyttleton (analyzed and condensed by J. L. Campbell)
  - A Personal Testimony - H. W. Webb-Peploe
- Volume VI:
  - The Testimony of Foreign Missions to the Superintending Providence of God - Arthur T. Pierson
  - Is There a God? - Thomas Whitelaw
  - Sin and Judgment to Come - Robert Anderson
  - The Atonement - Franklin Johnson
  - The God-Man - John Stock
  - The Early Narratives of Genesis - James Orr
  - The Person and Work of Jesus Christ - John L. Nuelsen
  - The Hope of the Church - John McNicol
- Volume VII:
  - The Passing of Evolution - George Frederick Wright
  - Inspiration - L. W. Munhall
  - The Testimony of the Scriptures to Themselves - George S. Bishop
  - Testimony of the Organic Unity of the Bible to its Inspiration - Arthur T. Pierson
  - One Isaiah - George L. Robinson
  - The Book of Daniel - Joseph D. Wilson
  - Three Peculiarities of the Pentateuch - Andrew Craig Robinson
  - Millennial Dawn: A Counterfeit of Christianity - William G. Moorehead
- Volume VIII:
  - Old Testament Criticism and New Testament Christianity - W. H. Griffith Thomas
  - Evolutionism in the Pulpit - Anonymous
  - Decadence of Darwinism - Henry H. Beach
  - Paul's Testimony to the Doctrine of Sin - Charles B. Williams
  - The Science of Conversion - H. M. Sydenstricker
  - The Doctrinal Value of the First Chapters of Genesis - Dyson Hague
  - The Knowledge of God - James Burrell
  - "Preach the Word" - Howard Crosby
  - Mormonism: Its Origin, Characteristics, and Doctrines - R. G. McNiece
- Volume IX:
  - The True Church - Bishop Ryle
  - The Mosaic Authorship of the Pentateuch - George Frederick Wright
  - The Wisdom of this World - A. W. Pitzer
  - Holy Scripture and Modern Negations - James Orr
  - Salvation by Grace - Thomas Spurgeon
  - Divine Efficacy of Prayer - Arthur T. Pierson
  - What Christ Teaches Concerning Future Retribution - William C. Procter
  - A Message from Missions - Charles A. Bowen
  - Eddyism: Commonly Called Christian Science - Maurice E. Wilson
- Volume X:
  - Why Save the Lord's Day? - Daniel Hoffman Martin
  - The Internal Evidence of the Fourth Gospel - Canon G. Osborne Troop
  - The Nature of Regeneration - Thomas Boston
  - Regeneration—Conversion—Reformation - George W. Lasher
  - Our Lord's Teachings About Money - Arthur T. Pierson
  - Satan and His Kingdom - Mrs. Jessie Penn-Lewis
  - The Holy Spirit and the Sons of God - W. J. Erdman
  - Consecration - Henry W. Frost
  - The Apologetic Value of Paul's Epistles - E.J. Stobo
  - What the Bible Contains for the Believer - George F. Pentecost
  - Modern Spiritualism Briefly Tested by Scripture - Algernon J. Pollock
- Volume XI:
  - The Biblical Conception of Sin - Thomas Whitelaw
  - At-One-Ment by Propitiation - Dyson Hague
  - The Grace of God - C. I. Scofield
  - Fulfilled Prophecy A Potent Argument for the Bible - Arno C. Gaebelein
  - The Coming of Christ - Charles R. Erdman
  - Is Romanism Christianity? - T. W. Medhurst
  - Rome, The Antagonist of the Nation - J. M. Foster
- Volume XII:
  - Doctrines that Must be Emphasized in Successful Evangelism - L. W. Munhall
  - Pastoral and Personal Evangelism, or Winning Men to Christ One-by-One - John Timothy Stone
  - The Sunday School's True Evangelism - Charles Gallaudet Trumbull
  - Foreign Missions or World-Wide Evangelism - Robert E. Speer
  - What Missionary Motives Should Prevail? - Henry W. Frost
  - The Place of Prayer in Evangelism - R. A. Torrey
  - The Church and Socialism - Charles R. Erdman
  - The Fifteen Books Most Indispensable for the Minister or the Christian Worker

== See also ==
- Conflict thesis
- Fundamentalist–modernist controversy
- Modernism in the Catholic Church

== Sources ==
- Almond, Gabriel A.; Appleby, R. Scott; Sivan, Emmanuel (2003). Strong Religion: the Rise of Fundamentalisms around the World. University of Chicago Press. ISBN 0-226-01497-5. OCLC 50562054.
- Clayton, Bruce (1999). Debating Southern History: Ideas and Action in the Twentieth Century. Rowman & Littlefield. ISBN 978-0-8476-9413-6.
- Cowan, Douglas E. (2023). The Christian Countercult Movement. Elements in New Religious Movements. Cambridge University Press. doi:10.1017/9781009053419. ISBN 978-1-009-05417-1.
- Gloege, Timothy (2015). Guaranteed Pure: The Moody Bible Institute, Business, and the Making of Modern Evangelicalism. University of North Carolina Press. ISBN 978-1469621012.
- Gorrell, Donald K. (1988). The Age of Social Responsibility: The Social Gospel in the Progressive Era, 1900-1920. Mercer University Press. ISBN 978-0-86554-316-4.
- Marsden, George M. (1980). Fundamentalism and American Culture: The Shaping of Twentieth Century Evangelicalism, 1870-1925. Oxford University Press. ISBN 9780195027587. OCLC 61445933.
- Marsden, George M. (1988). "Fundamentalism". In Lippy, Charles H.; Williams, Peter W. (eds.). Encyclopedia of the American Religious Experience: Studies of Traditions and Movements. Vol. 2. Charles Scribner's Sons. pp. 947–962. ISBN 978-0-684-18062-5.
- Marsden, George M. (1991). Understanding Fundamentalism and Evangelicalism. William B. Eerdmans Publishing Company. ISBN 0-8028-0539-6. OCLC 22710248.
- Numbers, Ronald A. (1992). The Creationists. Alfred A. Knopf. ISBN 0-679-40104-0. OCLC 24318343.
- Sandeen, Ernest R. (1970). The Roots of Fundamentalism: British and American Millenarianism, 1800-1930. University of Chicago Press. ISBN 0226734676.
- Treloar, Geoffrey R. (2023). "The Fundamentals". In Atherstone, Andrew; Ceri Jones, David (eds.). The Oxford Handbook of Christian Fundamentalism. Oxford University Press. pp. 25–42. doi:10.1093/oxfordhb/9780198844594.013.4. ISBN 978-0-19-884459-4.
