= James Orr (theologian) =

British Presbyterian minister, historian and theologian (1844-1913)

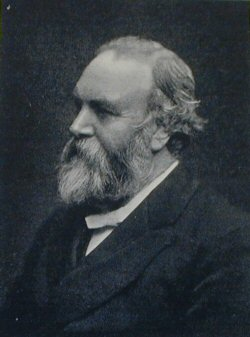
James Orr

James Orr (1844–6 September 1913) was a Scottish Presbyterian minister and professor of church history and then theology. He was an influential defender of evangelical doctrine and a contributor to The Fundamentals, a series of essays published between 1910 and 1915.

== Biography ==
Orr was born in Glasgow and spent his childhood in Manchester and Leeds. He was orphaned and became an apprentice bookbinder, but went on to enter Glasgow University in 1865. In 1870, he obtained an M.A. in Philosophy of Mind, and after graduating from the theological college of the United Presbyterian Church, he was ordained a minister in Hawick. In 1885, he received a D.D. from Glasgow University, and in the early 1890s, delivered a series of lectures that later became the influential The Christian View of God and the World.

He was appointed professor of church history in 1891 at the theological college of the United Presbyterian Church. He was one of the primary promoters of the union of the United Presbyterian Church with the Free Church of Scotland, and he represented the United Presbyterians in the unification talks. After they joined in 1900, he moved to Free Church College (now Trinity College, Glasgow), as professor of apologetics and theology. He lectured widely in both Britain and the United States.

== Views ==
Orr was a vocal critic of theological liberalism (of Albrecht Ritschl especially) and helped establish Christian fundamentalism. His lectures and writings upheld the doctrines of the virgin birth and resurrection of Jesus, and the infallibility of the Bible. In contrast to modern fundamentalists and his friend B. B. Warfield, he did not agree with the position of Biblical inerrancy. Like Warfield, but also unlike modern Christian fundamentalists, he advocated a position which he called "theistic evolution". Orr wrote that "evolution is coming to be recognized as but a new name for 'creation', only that the creative power now works from within, instead of, as in the old conception, in an external plastic fashion."

In his book Revelation and Inspiration (1910), he wrote that evolution is not in conflict with the Christian theistic view of the world.

== Bibliography ==
- The Christian View of God and the World (1893) online version
- The Ritschlian Theology and the Evangelical Faith (1897)
- Neglected Factors in the Study of the Early Progress of Christianity (1899)
- The Progress of Dogma (1902)
- David Hume (1903)
- Ritschlianism; Expository and Critical Essays (1903)
- New Testament Apocryphal Writings (London 1903); Protevangelium of James: on the birth of Mary | Gospel of Thomas: miracles of the infancy | Gospel of Pseudo-Matthew | Gospel of Nicodemus | Gospel of Peter | Acts of Paul and Thecla | The Falling Asleep of Mary. 182 pp.
- God's Image in Man and its Defacement in Light of Modern Denials (1905)
- Problem of the Old Testament Considered with Reference to Recent Criticism (1906)
- The Bible under Trial. Apologetic Papers in View of Present Day Assaults on Holy Scripture (1907) online version
- The Virgin Birth of Christ Hodder and Stoughton, London (1907)
- The Resurrection of Jesus (1908)
- Side-Lights on Christian Doctrine (1909)
- Revelation and Inspiration (1910)
- Sin as a Problem To-Day (1910)
- The History and Literature of the Early Church (1913)
- "The Holy Scriptures and Modern Negations", "The Early Narratives of Genesis", "Science and Christian Faith", and "The Virgin Birth of Christ", in The Fundamentals: A testimony to the truth, R.A. Torrey and A.C. Dixon (eds) (1917) online version
- The International Standard Bible Encyclopedia (ed.) (1939)

== Secondary Sources ==
1. Coke, Tom S. “Reconsidering James Orr.” Reformed Journal, vol. 30, no. 12, Dec. 1980, pp. 20–22.
2. Davies, William Walter. “The Battle of the Critics.” Methodist Review, vol. 88, Sept. 1906, pp. 827–830.
3. Dorrien, Gary J. The Remaking of Evangelical Theology (Louisville, KY: Westminster John Knox Press, 1998).
4. Eyre-Todd, “Rev. James Orr.” In Who’s Who in Glasgow in 1909 (Cambridge: Chadwyck-Healey, 1987).
5. Hoefel, Robert J. “B B Warfield and James Orr: A Study in Contrasting Approaches to Scripture.” Christian Scholar’s Review, vol. 16, no. 1, Sept. 1986, pp. 40–52.
6. Hoefel, Robert J. The Doctrine of Inspiration in the Writings of James Orr and B.B. Warfield: A Study in Contrasting Approaches to Scripture (Ph.D. Diss.: Fuller Theological Seminary, 1983).
7. Livingstone, David N. “B B Warfield, the Theory of Evolution and Early Fundamentalism.” The Evangelical Quarterly, vol. 58, no. 1, Jan. 1986, pp. 69–83.
8. McGrath, Gavin Basil. “James Orr’s Endorsement of Theistic Evolution.” Perspectives on Science and Christian Faith, vol. 51, no. 2, June 1999, pp. 114–120.
9. Neely, Alan P. “James Orr and the Question of Inerrancy.” The Proceedings of the Conference on Biblical Inerrancy 1987, 1987, pp. 261–272.
10. Schaff, Philip. “Orr, James.” In New Schaff-Herzog Encyclopedia of Religious Knowledge (Grand Rapids, MI: Baker Book House, 1977).
11. Scorgie, Glen G. A Call for Continuity: The Theological Contributions of James Orr. Mercer Univ Pr, 1988.
12. Scorgie, Glen G. “James Orr, Defender of the Church’s Faith.” Crux, vol. 22, no. 3, Sept. 1986, pp. 22–27.
13. Sell, Alan P. F. Defending and Declaring the Faith: Some Scottish Examples, 1860–1920 (Colorado: Helmers & Howard, 1987).
14. Shatzer, Jacob. “Theological Interpretation of Scripture and Evangelicals: An Apology for The Fundamentals.” Pro Ecclesia, vol. 22, no. 1, Wint 2013, pp. 88–102.
15. Toon, Peter. “The Development of Doctrine: An Evangelical Perspective.” Reformed Journal, vol. 23, no. 3, Mar. 1973, pp. 7–12.
16. Wright, David F. “Soundings in the Doctrine of Scripture in British Evangelicalism in the First Half of the Twentieth Century.” Tyndale Bulletin, vol. 31, 1980, pp. 87–106.
17. Zaspel, Fred G. “B. B. Warfield on Creation and Evolution.” Themelios, vol. 35, no. 2, July 2010, pp. 198–211.
18. Zorn, Raymond O. “The Christian View of God and the World.” Book Review. Mid-America Journal of Theology, vol. 8, no. 2, Fall 1992, pp. 217–218.z
