= Bobbie Jo and the Outlaw =

1976 film by Mark L. Lester

- Theatrical release poster
- Directed by: Mark L. Lester
- Written by: Vernon Zimmerman
- Produced by: Mark L. Lester; Steve Broidy; Lynn Ross
- Starring: Lynda Carter; Marjoe Gortner
- Cinematography: Stanley Wright
- Edited by: Michael Luciano
- Music by: Barry De Vorzon
- Production company: American International Pictures
- Distributed by: American International Pictures
- Release dates: April 28, 1976 (LA); July 7, 1976 (NYC)
- Running time: 89 minutes
- Country: United States
- Language: English
- Box office: $5 milliion

Bobbie Jo and the Outlaw is a 1976 crime drama film directed by Mark L. Lester and starring Marjoe Gortner and Lynda Carter. The film marks the big screen debut of Lynda Carter and was released four months after her first appearance as the star of the television series Wonder Woman.

== Plot ==
Bobbie Jo and the Outlaw is a 1976 crime drama that follows the story of Bobbie Jo Baker, a young country singer with dreams of escaping her small-town life, and her lover, Lyle Wheeler, a charismatic drifter with a penchant for trouble.

The film begins with Lyle arriving in a small New Mexico town, where he meets Bobbie Jo, a carhop and aspiring singer. Captivated by Lyle's free-spirited attitude, Bobbie Jo quickly falls for him and decides to leave her mundane life behind to join him on the road. Together, along with Bobbie Jo's best friend Essie, they embark on a journey across The Southwest, with Bobbie Jo hoping to find excitement and a better future, leaving her bickering, alcoholic mother behind.

As their relationship intensifies, Lyle introduces Bobbie Jo to a life of crime. They start with small-time thefts, but their criminal activities soon escalate to more dangerous endeavors. Along the way, they are joined by Bobbie Jo's older sister, Pearl, and her troublesome boyfriend, Slick. The group form a makeshift gang, committing robberies to fund their adventurous lifestyle.

However, their criminal spree begins to spiral out of control. Slick becomes increasingly reckless and violent, dragging the group deeper into dangerous situations. Tensions rise among the gang members, leading to conflicts and betrayals. Despite the thrill of their outlaw lifestyle, Bobbie Jo starts to realize that their actions have serious consequences, and the life she once dreamed of is slipping away.

As the gang find themselves somewhat famous and on the run from the authorities, the law, led by a vengeful Sheriff Hicks, eventually catches up with them. Their journey takes a tragic turn as members of the gang are killed off in various shootouts with the police. The film culminates in a final confrontation, where the gang face the reality of their situation.

In the end, Bobbie Jo is the lone survivor of the gang, her dreams shattered by the harsh realities of their criminal lifestyle. The film closes with her in police custody, sobbing over the dead body of her lover, Lyle. Sheriff Hicks reads a passage from a book belonging to Lyle found at the scene, and in a fit of rage, Bobbie Jo spits in his face and starts cursing at him as he orders her to be taken away, the only one left to pay for the entire gang's deadly crimes.

== Cast ==
- Marjoe Gortner as Lyle Wheeler
- Lynda Carter as Bobbie Jo Baker
- Jesse Vint as "Slick" Callahan
- Merrie Lynn Ross as Pearl Baker
- Gerrit Graham as Ray "Magic Ray"
- Belinda Balaski as Essie Beaumont
- Peggy Stewart as Hattie Baker
- Gene Drew as Sheriff Bud Hicks
- Richard Breeding as Deputy Leroy
- John Durren as Deputy Gance
- Chuck Russell as Deputy
- Virgil Frye as Joe Grant
- Howard R. Kirk as Mr. Potts
- Aly Yoder as Mrs. Potts
- Jesse Price as Buford, The Grocery Clerk
- James Gammon as Leather Salesman
- Jose Toledo as Old Indian
- Bobby Bare as Singer

== Production ==
The film was originally to be called "Desperado" another working title was "Bobbi Jo and the Outlaw Man" was filmed in 1975. The film was shot in New Mexico.

The movie was based on the Billy the Kid story. Sylvester Stallone was almost cast in the lead.

== Home media ==
The film was released on DVD on April 18, 2011 and on Blu-ray on December 8, 2015.
