= Vance Havner =

American Southern Baptist minister

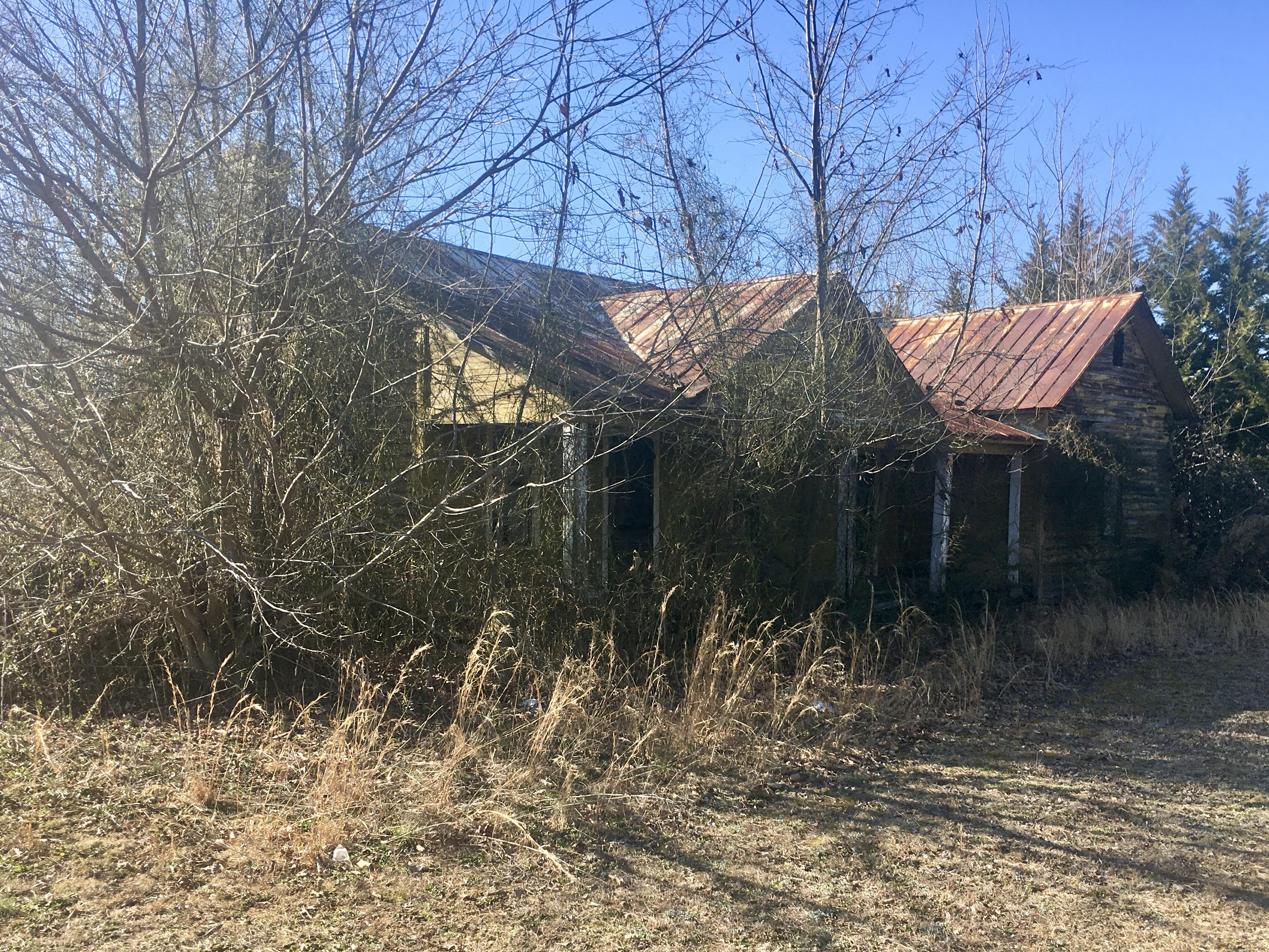
- Havner's birthplace in North Carolina
- Born: Vance Havner; October 17, 1901; Vale, North Carolina, U.S.
- Died: August 12, 1986 (aged 84)
- Occupations: Pastor, evangelist, author
- Years active: 1912–1986
- Known for: Christian ministry, authorship
- Notable work: Though I Walk Through the Valley (1974)

Vance Havner (October 17, 1901 – August 12, 1986) was an American Southern Baptist minister, evangelist, and author. Over a ministry career spanning more than seven decades, he became widely recognized for his concise preaching style, commitment to biblical authority, and focus on revivalism. He initially served as a pastor before transitioning to a career in itinerant evangelism. Billy Graham referred to him as "the most quoted preacher in America," and he remains influential in conservative Protestant circles.

== Early life and initial ministry ==
Havner was born on October 17, 1901, in Vale, North Carolina. He displayed an aptitude for preaching from a young age, delivering his first sermon at 12 years old. By the age of 15, he had been ordained as a Baptist minister, gaining regional recognition for his direct and compelling sermons.

Havner briefly attended Catawba College, Wake Forest University, and Moody Bible Institute but did not complete a degree at any of them. He later credited his development largely to personal study of the Bible, John Bunyan's Pilgrim's Progress, and the sermons and writings of preachers such as Charles Spurgeon.

== Theological shift ==
In his early ministry, Havner was influenced by modernist theologians, including Harry Emerson Fosdick, which led to a temporary shift in his theological outlook. However, he returned to a more conservative stance after reading J. Gresham Machen’s Christianity and Liberalism, which critiqued liberal theology. This reinforced his commitment to biblical authority, a theme that would define much of his preaching and writing.

== Pastorate and itinerant evangelism ==
From 1934 to 1939, Havner served as pastor of First Baptist Church in Charleston, South Carolina. He resigned in 1939 to pursue itinerant evangelism, traveling across the United States to hold revival services. His preaching consistently emphasized themes of repentance, faith, and biblical authority over what he referred to as the “social gospel”. He believed that genuine revival required a return to foundational biblical truths.

Havner's ministry was characterized by a simple, yet profound, speaking style. He often employed anecdotes, humor, and pointed observations to illustrate theological truths. His sermons and books frequently addressed themes of spiritual complacency, urging Christians to seek a deeper commitment to their faith.

== Legacy and influence ==
Havner’s sermons and writings were widely circulated, and he became known for succinct, memorable expressions. Billy Graham presided at his funeral in 1986, reiterating his view of Havner as “the most quoted preacher in America.”

Havner’s statements have been cited in various contexts beyond the pulpit. His words are frequently quoted by Father Tim, the protagonist in Jan Karon’s Mitford series, and a saying attributed to him was included in the United States Congressional Record on January 30, 1992, during the opening prayer by Chaplain Richard C. Halverson in the United States Senate: "The foundations of this country were not laid by politicians running for something, but by statesmen standing for something!"

His pithy style led to the publication of The Vance Havner Quotebook (1986), edited by Dennis J. Hester (ISBN 0801042992), which compiled many of his most well-known statements on Christian living and faith.

== Selected bibliography ==
- Though I Walk Through the Valley (1974).
