= Fundamentalist–modernist controversy =

Christian religious issue

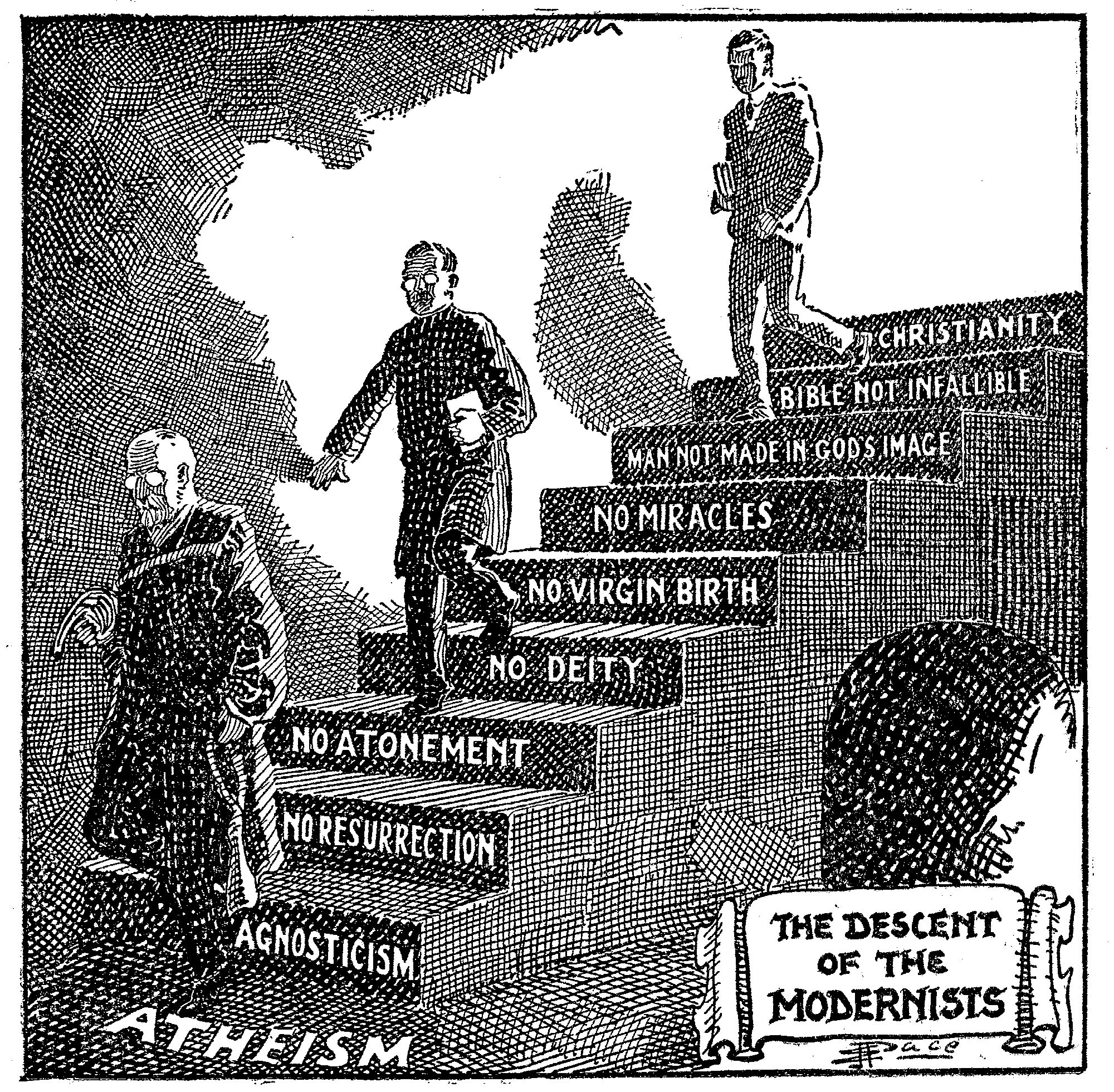
A fundamentalist cartoon by E. J. Pace portraying modernism as the descent from Christianity to atheism, first published in 1922 and then used in Seven Questions in Dispute by William Jennings Bryan

The fundamentalist–modernist controversy is a major schism that originated in the 1920s and 1930s within the Presbyterian Church in the United States of America. At issue were foundational disputes about the role of Christianity; the authority of the Bible; and the death, resurrection, and atoning sacrifice of Jesus Christ. Two broad factions within Protestantism emerged: fundamentalists, who insisted upon the timeless validity of each doctrine of Christian orthodoxy; and modernists, who advocated a conscious adaptation of the Christian faith in response to the new scientific discoveries and moral pressures of the age. At first, the schism was limited to Reformed churches and centered around the Princeton Theological Seminary, whose fundamentalist faculty members founded Westminster Theological Seminary when Princeton went in a liberal direction. However, it soon spread, affecting nearly every Protestant denomination in the United States. Denominations that were not initially affected, such as the Lutheran churches, eventually were embroiled in the controversy, leading to a schism in the United States.

By the end of the 1930s, proponents of theological liberalism had, at the time, effectively won the debate, with the modernists in control of all mainline Protestant seminaries, publishing houses, and denominational hierarchies in the United States. More conservative Christians withdrew from the mainstream, founding their own publishing houses, universities, and seminaries. This would remain the state of affairs until the 1970s, when conservative Protestantism emerged on a larger scale in the United States, resulting in the rise of conservatism among the Southern Baptists, Presbyterians, and others.

== Background ==
=== Early controversies in Presbyterianism ===
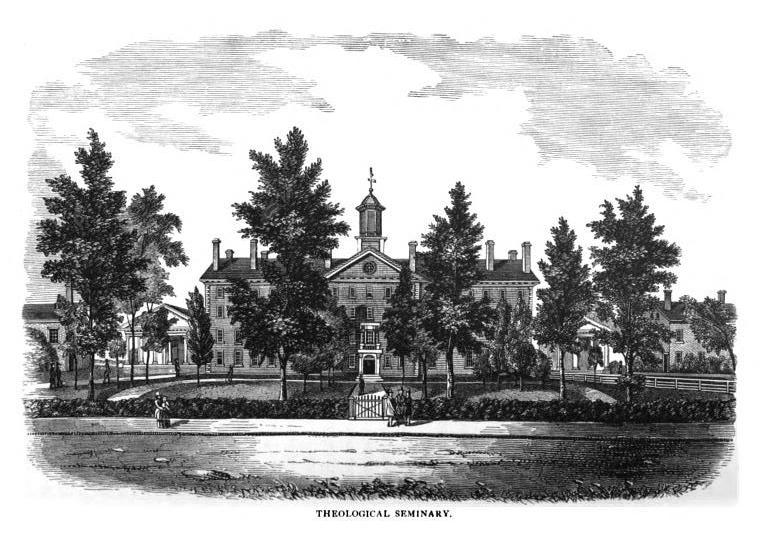
Princeton Theological Seminary, headquarters of the Old School Presbyterians (1879)

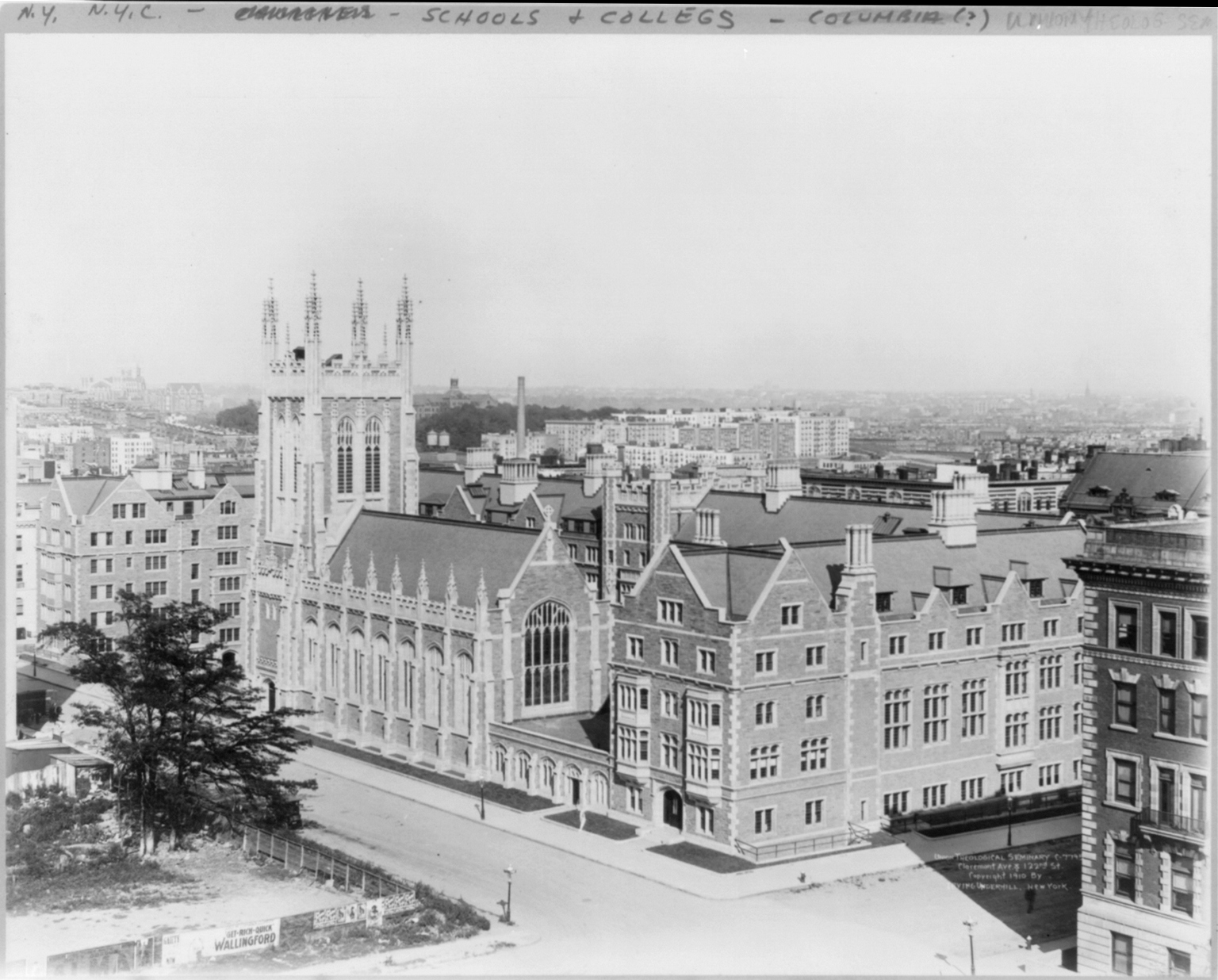
Union Theological Seminary in the City of New York, headquarters of the New School Presbyterians (1910)

American Presbyterianism had gone into schism twice in the past, and these divisions were important precursors to the fundamentalist–modernist controversy. The first was the Old Side–New Side controversy, which occurred during the First Great Awakening and resulted in the Presbyterian Church in 1741 being divided into an Old Side and New Side. The two churches reunified in 1758. The second was the Old School–New School controversy, which occurred in the wake of the Second Great Awakening and which saw the Presbyterian Church split into two denominations starting in 1836–1838.

=== The rise of higher criticism, 1880–1893 ===
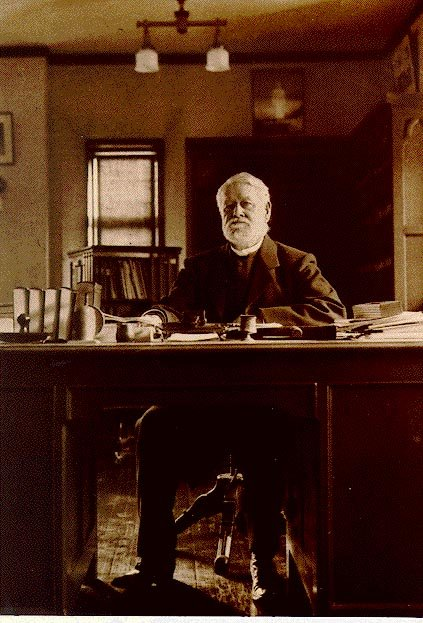
Charles Augustus Briggs (1841–1913), the first major proponent of higher criticism within the Presbyterian Church in the United States of America and the source of a major controversy within the church, 1880–1893

The first major proponent of higher criticism within the Presbyterian Church was Charles Augustus Briggs, who had studied higher criticism in Germany (in 1866). In 1891, Briggs was appointed as Union Theological Seminary's first-ever professor of Biblical theology. His inaugural address, entitled "The Authority of Holy Scripture", proved to be highly controversial. Whereas previously, higher criticism had seemed a fairly technical, scholarly issue, Briggs now spelt out its full implications. In the address, he announced that higher criticism had now definitively proven that Moses did not write the Pentateuch; that Ezra did not write Ezra, Chronicles or Nehemiah; Jeremiah did not write the books of Kings or the Lamentations; David did not write most of the Psalms; Solomon wrote not the Song of Solomon or Ecclesiastes but only a few Proverbs; and Isaiah did not write half of the book of Isaiah. The Old Testament was merely a historical record that showed man in a lower state of moral development, with modern man having progressed morally far beyond Noah, Abraham, Jacob, Judah, David, and Solomon. At any rate, according to Briggs, the Scriptures as a whole were riddled with errors and the doctrine of scriptural inerrancy taught at Princeton Theological Seminary "is a ghost of modern evangelicalism to frighten children."

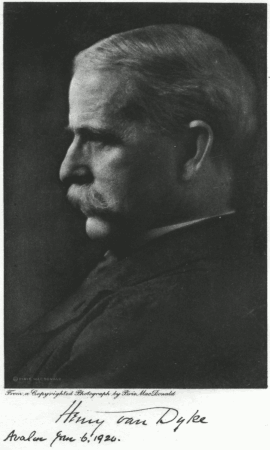
Henry van Dyke (1852–1933), a modernist who pushed for revisions to the Westminster Confession of Faith, 1900–1910

=== The movement to revise the Westminster Confession of Faith, 1900–1910 ===
Henry van Dyke, a modernist who had been a major supporter of Briggs in 1893, now headed a movement of modernists and New Schoolers to revise the Westminster Confession of Faith. Since 1889, Van Dyke had been calling for credal revision to affirm that all dying infants (not just elect dying infants) go to heaven, to say that God loved the whole world (not just the elect), and to affirm that Christ atoned for all mankind, not just the elect. In 1901, he chaired a 25-man committee (with a New School majority). Also in 1901, he drew up a non-binding summary of the church's faith. It mentioned neither biblical inerrancy nor reprobation, affirmed God's love of all mankind, and denied that the Pope was the Antichrist. It was adopted by General Assembly in 1902 and ratified by the presbyteries in 1904.

As a result of the changes, the Arminian-leaning Cumberland Presbyterian Church petitioned for reunification, and in 1906, over 1000 Cumberland Presbyterian ministers joined the Presbyterian Church in the USA. The arrival of so many liberal ministers strengthened the New School's position in the church.

== The Doctrinal Deliverance of 1910 (the Five Fundamentals) ==
The Doctrinal Deliverance of 1910, also known as The Five Point Deliverance or The Five Fundamentals, was a doctrinal statement born out of a conflict that originated in the New York Presbytery, stemming from a 1909 debate in the presbytery about whether or not to ordain three men who refused to assent to the doctrine of the virgin birth of Jesus.

The majority eventually ordained the men while the minority complained to the General Assembly. However, under the order of the Presbyterian Church in the USA, the General Assembly was not authorized to accept or dismiss the complaint. It should have demitted the complaint to the presbytery and could have done so with instructions that the presbytery hold a heresy trial. The result of the trial could then be appealed to the Synod of New York and from there to the General Assembly. The 1910 General Assembly, acting outside its scope of authority, dismissed the complaint against the three men and at the same time instructed its Committee on Bills and Overtures to prepare a statement for governing future ordinations. The committee reported, and the General Assembly passed the Doctrinal Deliverance of 1910, which declared that five doctrines were "essential and necessary" to the Christian faith:

- The inspiration of the Bible by the Holy Spirit and the inerrancy of Scripture as a result of this.
- The virgin birth of Christ.
- The belief that Christ's death was an atonement for sin.
- The bodily resurrection of Christ.
- The historical reality of Christ's miracles.

The five propositions would become known to history as the "Five Fundamentals" and by the late 1910s, theological conservatives rallying around the Five Fundamentals came to be known as "fundamentalists".

== The Fundamentals and "Back to Fundamentals" ==
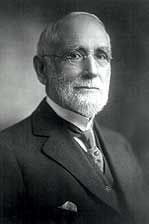
Lyman Stewart (1840–1923), Presbyterian layman and co-founder of Union Oil, who funded the publication of The Fundamentals: A Testimony to the Truth (1910–1915)

Between 1910 and 1915, a series of pamphlets entitled The Fundamentals: A Testimony to the Truth were published by A. C. Dixon (1854-1925), R. A. Torrey (1856-1928), and others. The series eventually included 90 essays written by a total of 64 authors from several denominations. A wealthy Presbyterian layman, Lyman Stewart, the founder of Union Oil and a proponent of dispensationalism as taught in the newly published Scofield Reference Bible, funded the publication along with his brother Milton Stewart. The series was conservative and critical of Higher Criticism but also broad in its approach, and the scholars who contributed articles included several Presbyterian moderates who would later be opposed to "fundamentalism" such as Charles R. Erdman Sr. and Robert Elliott Speer.

In the years after the publication of The Fundamentals, Northern Baptist editor Curtis Lee Laws coined the term "fundamentalist" when he suggest that "those who still cling to the great fundamentals and who mean to do battle royal for the fundamentals shall be called Fundamentalists".

== Ecumenism, 1908–1921 ==
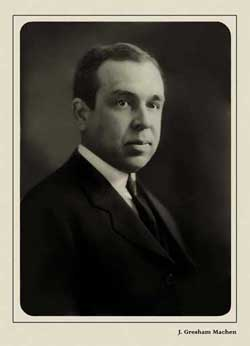
J. Gresham Machen (1881–1937), founder of the Orthodox Presbyterian Church and the Westminster Theological Seminary

Several leading Presbyterians, notably Robert E. Speer, played a role in founding the Federal Council of Churches in 1908. This organization (which received 5% of its first year's budget from John D. Rockefeller Jr.) was heavily associated with the Social Gospel, and with the Progressive movement more broadly. The Council's Social Creed of the Churches was adopted by the Presbyterian Church in 1910, but conservatives in General Assembly were able to resist endorsing most of the Council's specific proposals, except for those calling for Prohibition and sabbath laws.

In response to World War I, the FCC established the General War-Time Commission to coordinate the work of Protestant, Catholic, and Jewish programs related to the war and work closely with the Department of War. It was chaired by Speer and liberal Union Theological Seminary professor William Adams Brown. Following the war, they worked hard to build on this legacy of unity. The Presbyterian Board of Foreign Missions consequently called for a meeting of Protestant leaders on the topic and in early 1919 the Interchurch World Movement (IWM) was established with John Mott as its chairman. The Executive Committee of the Presbyterian Church offered millions of dollars' worth of support to help the IWM with fundraising. When the IWM collapsed financially, the denomination was on the hook for millions of dollars.

However, the debate between modernists and conservatives over the issue of the IWM was small compared to the Church Union debate. In 1919, the General Assembly sent a delegation to a national ecumenical convention that was proposing church union, and in 1920, General Assembly approved a recommendation which included "organic union" with 17 other denominations – the new organization, to be known as the United Churches of Christ in America, would be a sort of "federal government" for member churches: denominations would maintain their distinctive internal identities, but the broader organization would be in charge of things like missions and lobbying for things like prohibition. Under the terms of presbyterian polity, the measure would have to be approved by the presbyteries to take effect.

The plans for Church Union were roundly denounced by the Old School Princeton Theological Seminary faculty. It was at this point in 1920 that Princeton professor J. Gresham Machen first gained prominence within the denomination as a fundamentalist opponent of Church Union, which he argued would destroy Presbyterian distinctives, and effectively cede control of the denomination to modernists and their New School allies. However, chinks were starting to show in the Princeton faculty's armor. Charles Erdman and the president of the seminary, William Robinson, came out in favor of the union.

Ultimately, the presbyteries defeated church union by a vote of 150–100 in 1921.

== "Shall the Fundamentalists Win?" (1922) ==
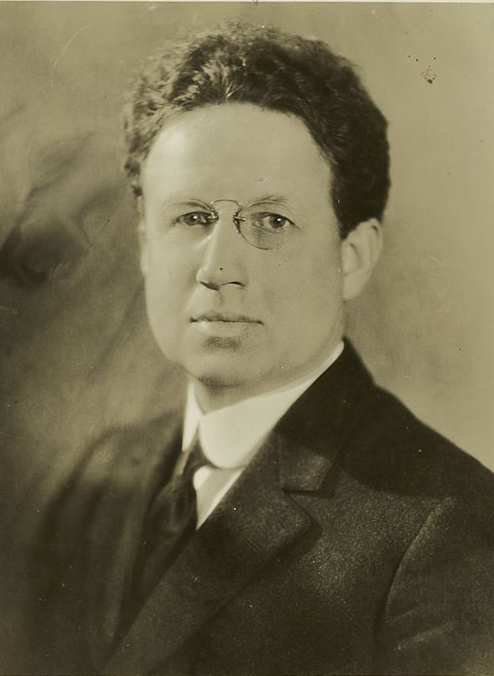
A 1926 photograph of Harry Emerson Fosdick (1878–1969), whose sermon "Shall the Fundamentalists Win?" (1922) sparked the fundamentalist–modernist controversy.

The splits between fundamentalists and modernists had been bubbling in the Presbyterian Church for some time. In 1918, with the union of three of New York City's historic Presbyterian churches into one congregation at First Presbyterian Church, Dr. George Alexander was called to the pastorate. At the same time, Fosdick was given the role of clerical staff with the chief duty of preaching. Fosdick was an ordained Northern Baptist minister and a modernist, but had been given authorization to preach by the New York Presbytery.

The event which was to bring the issue to a head was Harry Emerson Fosdick's sermon of May 21, 1922, entitled Shall the Fundamentalists Win?. In this sermon, Fosdick presented the liberals in both the Presbyterian Church and the Northern Baptist Convention as sincere evangelical Christians who were struggling to reconcile new discoveries in history, science, and religion with the Christian faith. Fundamentalists, on the other hand, were cast as intolerant conservatives who refused to deal with these new discoveries and had arbitrarily drawn the line as to what was off limits in religious discussion. Many people, Fosdick argued, simply found it impossible to accept the virgin birth of Christ, the doctrine of substitutionary atonement, or the literal Second Coming of Christ in the light of modern science. Given the different points of view within the church, only tolerance and liberty could allow for these different perspectives to co-exist in the church.

Conservative Clarence E. Macartney, pastor of Arch Street Presbyterian Church in Philadelphia, responded to Fosdick with a sermon of his own, entitled "Shall Unbelief Win?", which was quickly published in a pamphlet. He argued that liberalism had been progressively "secularizing" the church and, if left unchecked, would lead to "a Christianity of opinions and principles and good purposes, but a Christianity without worship, without God, and without Jesus Christ".

John Foster Dulles was one of a three-member steering committee appointed to determine not only whether the General Assembly's doctrinal declarations were binding on the presbyteries, but also with regards to whether Fosdick would be allowed to stay in the pulpit.

== William Jennings Bryan and the General Assembly of 1923 ==
Charles Hodge, one of the few Presbyterian controversialists to address Darwinism prior to World War I, published his What is Darwinism? in 1874, three years after The Descent of Man was published. He argued that if Charles Darwin's theory excluded the design argument, it was effectively atheism and could not be reconciled with biblical Christianity. Asa Gray responded that Christianity was compatible with Darwin's science. Both he and many other Christians accepted various forms of theistic evolution, and Darwin had not excluded the work of the Creator as a primary cause.

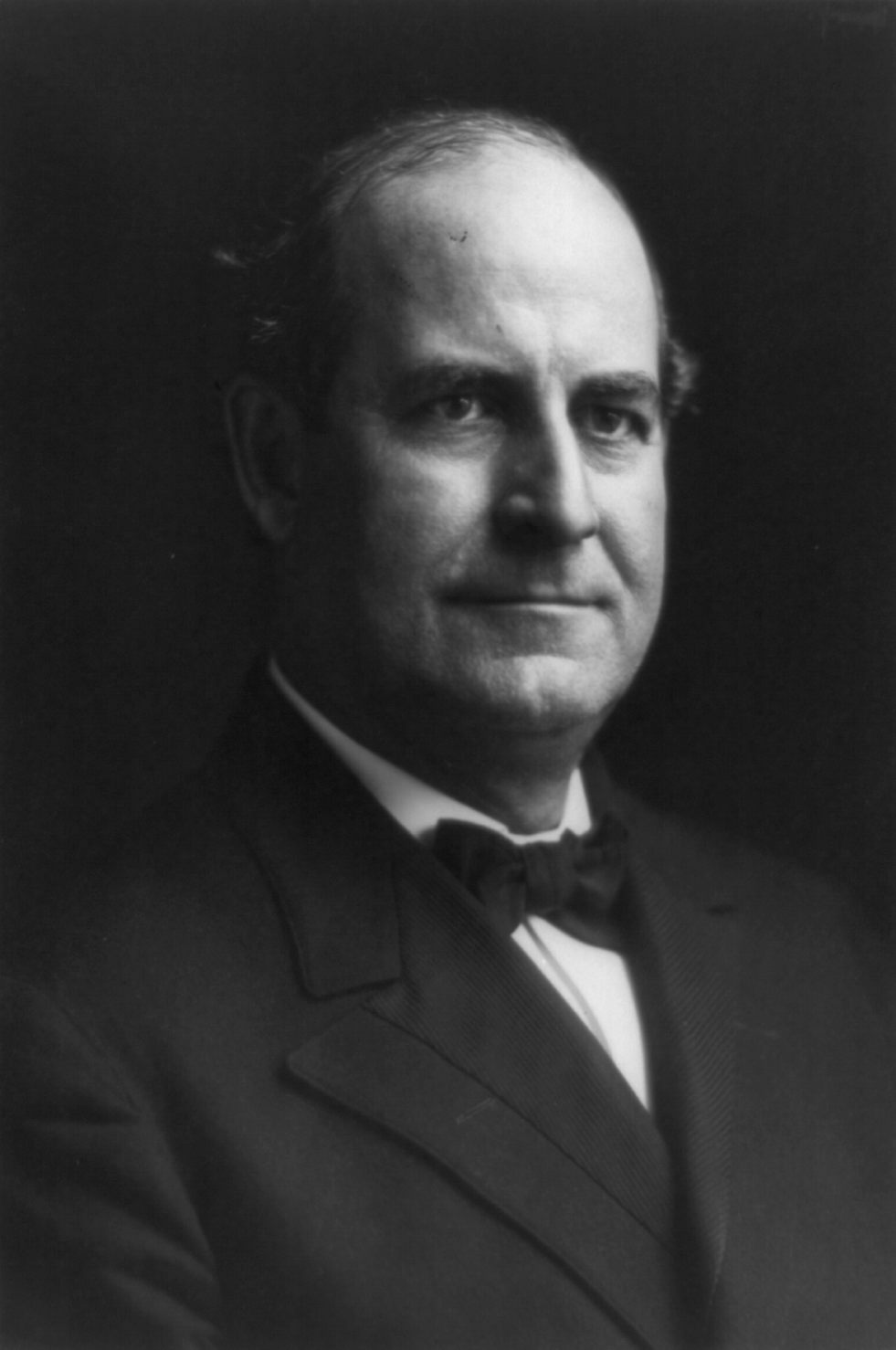
William Jennings Bryan (1860–1925) in 1907

William Jennings Bryan, a former lawyer and Presbyterian ruling elder, linked evolution to Germany, and claimed that Darwinism provided a justification for the strong to dominate the weak and was therefore the source of German militarism. He drew on reports by the entomologist Vernon Kellogg of German officers discussing the Darwinian rationale for their declaration of war, and the sociologist Benjamin Kidd's book The Science of Power which contended that Nietzsche's philosophy represented an interpretation of Darwinism, to conclude that Nietzsche's and Darwin's ideas were the impetus for German nationalism and militarism. Bryan argued that Germany's militarism and "barbarism" came from their belief that the "struggle for survival" described in Darwin's On the Origin of Species applied to nations as well as to individuals, and that "The same science that manufactured poisonous gases to suffocate soldiers is preaching that man has a brute ancestry and eliminating the miraculous and the supernatural from the Bible."

Bryan was, in essence, fighting what would later be called Social Darwinism, social and economic ideas owing as much to Herbert Spencer and Thomas Malthus as to Darwin, and viewed by modern biologists as a misuse of his theory. Germany, or so Bryan's argument ran, had replaced Christ's teachings with Nietzsche's philosophy based on ideas of survival of the fittest, and the implication was that America would suffer the same fate if unchecked. This fear was reinforced by the report of the psychologist James H. Leuba's 1916 study indicating that a considerable number of college students lost their faith during the four years they spent in college.

Bryan launched his campaign against Darwinism in 1921 when he was invited to give the James Sprunt Lectures at Virginia's Union Theological Seminary. At the end of one, The Menace of Darwinism, he said that "Darwinism is not a science at all; it is a string of guesses strung together" and that there is more science in the Bible's "And God said, Let the earth bring forth the living creature..." than in all of Darwin.

== The General Assembly of 1924 ==
The most significant conservative preparation for the General Assembly of 1924 actually occurred slightly before the 1923 General Assembly. This was the publication of J. Gresham Machen's Christianity and Liberalism. In this book, Machen argued that liberalism, far from being a set of teachings that could be accommodated within the church, was in fact antithetical to the principles of Christianity and was currently engaged in a struggle against historic Christianity.

== The Scopes trial (1925) ==
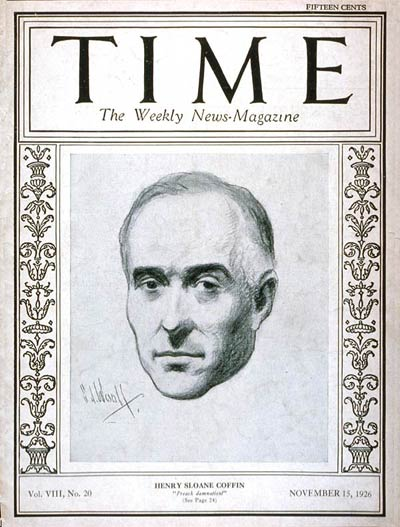
Henry Sloane Coffin (1877–1954) on the November 15, 1926 cover of Time magazine, during the time that he was president of the Union Theological Seminary, a post he held from 1926-1945. A prominent evangelical liberal, he actively opposed the stances promoted by William Jennings Bryan, such as those presented at the Scopes trial.

At the same time he had been campaigning against Darwinism within the Presbyterian Church, William Jennings Bryan had also been encouraging state lawmakers to pass laws banning the teaching of evolution in public schools. Several states had responded to Bryan's call, including Tennessee, which passed such a law in March 1925.

Given the present-day contours of the evolution–creation debate, in many states in 1925, evolution continued to be taught in church-run institutions at the same time that its teaching was banned in state-run public schools.

The ACLU was seeking a test case to challenge these anti-evolutionary laws. This led to the trial of John Scopes for teaching evolution in a public school in Dayton, Tennessee. The ACLU sent lawyer John Randolph Neal Jr. to defend Scopes.

Baptist pastor William Bell Riley, founder and president of the World Christian Fundamentals Association, persuaded William Jennings Bryan to act as its counsel. Bryan invited his major allies in the Presbyterian General Assembly to attend the trial with him, but J. Gresham Machen refused to testify, saying he had not studied biology in enough detail to testify at trial, while Clarence Macartney had a previous engagement. In response to the announcement that Bryan would be attending the trial, Clarence Darrow, who was a committed agnostic, volunteered to serve on Scopes's defense team.

== Foreign missions, 1930–1936 ==
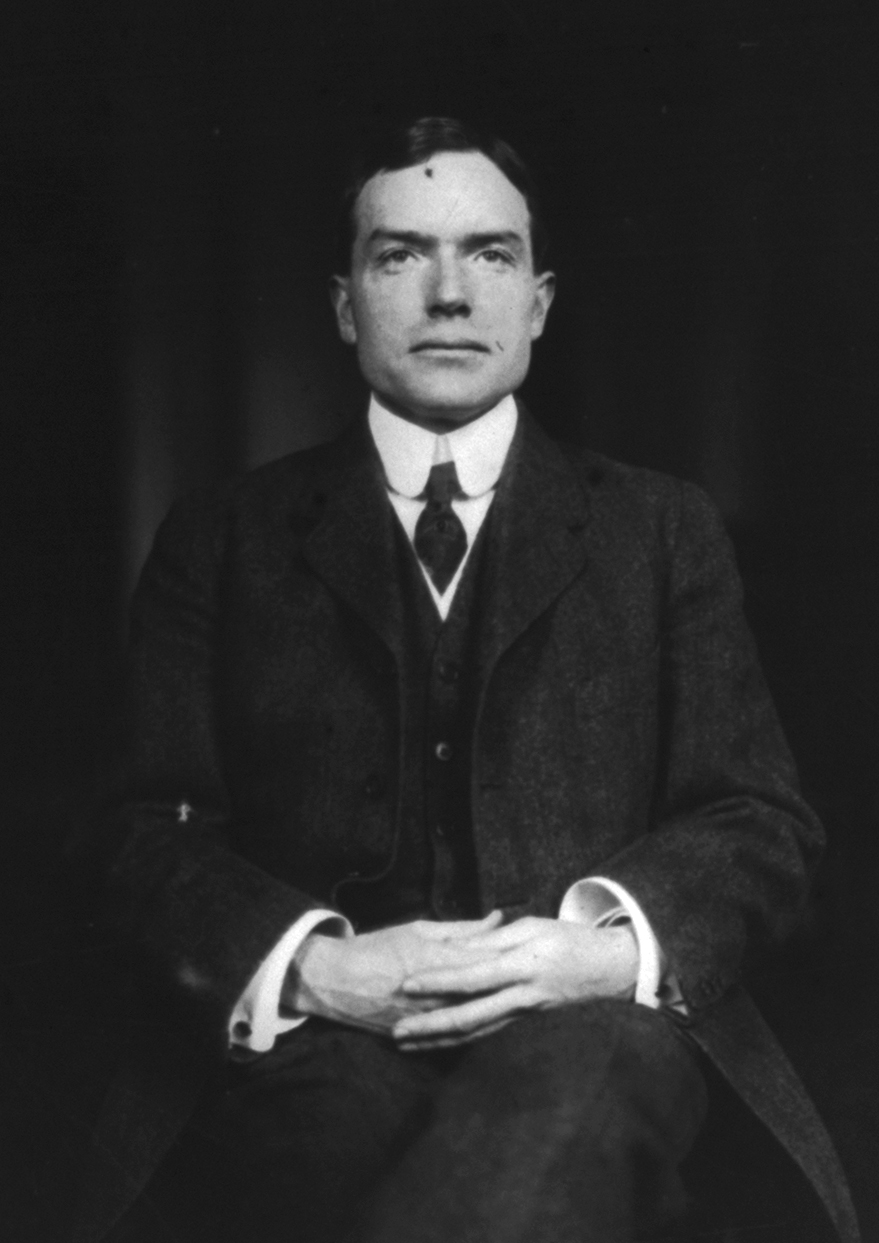
John D. Rockefeller Jr. (1874–1960)

In 1930, as a result of widespread second thoughts about missions in general, a group of Baptist laymen at the request of John D. Rockefeller Jr. concluded that it was time for a serious re-evaluation of the effectiveness of foreign missions. With Rockefeller's financial backing, they convinced seven major denominations – the Methodist Episcopal Church, the Northern Baptist Convention, the Reformed Church in America, the Congregational church, the Episcopal Church in the United States of America, the Presbyterian Church in the United States of America and the United Presbyterian Church of North America – to participate in their "Laymen's Foreign Missions Inquiry". They commissioned a study of missionaries in India, Burma, China, and Japan and launched a separate inquiry under the chairmanship of the philosopher and Harvard professor William Ernest Hocking. These two inquiries led to the publication of a one-volume summary of the findings of the Laymen's Inquiry entitled Re-Thinking Missions: A Laymen's Inquiry After One Hundred Years in 1932.

Re-Thinking Missions argued that in the face of emerging secularism, Christians should ally with other world religions, rather than struggle against them.

The seven denominations who had agreed to participate in the Laymen's Inquiry now distanced themselves from the report. The Presbyterian Board of Foreign Missions issued a statement reaffirming the board's commitment to the evangelistic basis of the missionary enterprise and to Jesus Christ as the only Lord and Savior.

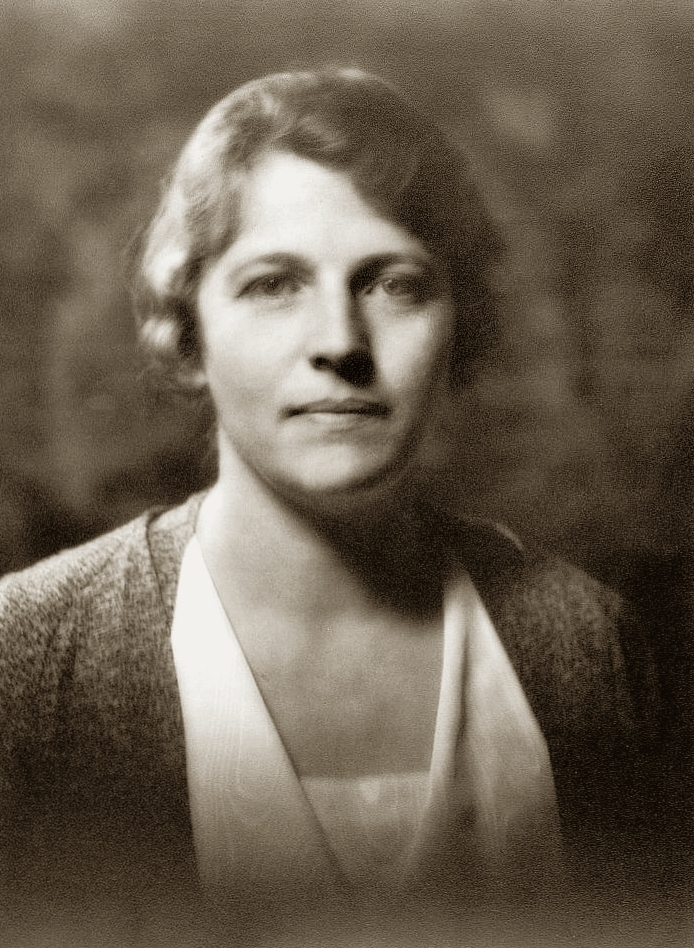
Pearl S. Buck (1892–1973)

Pearl S. Buck now weighed into the debate. In a review published in The Christian Century, she praised the report, saying it should be read by every Christian in America and, ironically mimicking the Biblical literalism of the fundamentalists, "I think this is the only book I have ever read that seems to me literally true in its every observation and right in its every conclusion." Then, in a November 1932 speech before a large audience at the Astor Hotel, later published in Harper's, Buck decried gauging the success of missions by the numbers of new church members. Instead she advocated humanitarian efforts to improve the agricultural, educational, medical, and sanitary conditions of the community. In the Harper's article along with another in Cosmopolitan published in May 1933, Buck rejected the doctrine of original sin, saying "I believe that most of us start out wanting to do right and to be good." She asserted that belief in the virgin birth or the divinity of Christ was not a prerequisite to being a Christian. She said that the only need is to acknowledge that one cannot live without Christ and to reflect that in one's life.

=== Creation of the Independent Board for Presbyterian Foreign Missions ===
Disapproving of General Assembly's decision not to appoint a new slate of conservatives to the Board of Foreign Missions, J. Gresham Machen, along with H. McAllister Griffiths, announced that they were forming an Independent Board for Presbyterian Foreign Missions to truly promote biblical and Presbyterian work. Macartney refused to go along with Machen in setting up an independent missions board.

== Legacy ==
As a result of the departure of Machen and the denominational conservatives, especially of the Old School, the shape of the Presbyterian Church in the USA as a modernist, liberal denomination was secured. The PCUSA eventually merged with the United Presbyterian Church of North America in 1958 to form the United Presbyterian Church in the United States of America and in 1983, the UPCUSA merged with the Presbyterian Church in the United States (the "Southern Presbyterians" who had split with the PCUSA in 1861 due to the Civil War) to form the current Presbyterian Church (USA).

The dispute between the fundamentalists and modernists would be played out in nearly every Christian denomination. By the 1920s, it was clear that every mainstream Protestant denomination was going to be willing to accommodate modernism, with the exception of the Presbyterians, Southern Baptists, and the Missouri Synod Lutherans, where the situation was still unclear. The departure of Machen and other conservatives brought the Presbyterians into the camp willing to accommodate modernism, leaving the Southern Baptists and the Missouri Synod as the only large, national denominations where orthodox Protestants were still active within the denomination. The conflict continued to roil both churches for most of the 20th century and the triumph of orthodox Protestantism in those denominations would not be secure until the Seminex schism in the Lutheran church and the Southern Baptist Convention conservative resurgence of 1979–1990.

== See also ==
- Conflict thesis
- Continuity thesis
- Culture Wars
- Modernism in the Catholic Church
- Traditional Catholicism and Second Vatican Council, a parallel divide within Catholicism

== Bibliography ==
- Cherny, Robert W. (October 30, 2014). A Righteous Cause: The Life of William Jennings Bryan. University of Oklahoma Press. ISBN 978-0-8061-7738-0.
- Chrisope, Terry (2000). Toward a Sure Faith: J. Gresham Machen and the Dilemma of Biblical Criticism, 1881-1915. Mentor. ISBN 978-1-85792-439-8.
- Coalter, Milton J.; Mulder, John M.; Weeks, Louis, eds. (January 1, 1990). The Confessional Mosaic: Presbyterians and Twentieth-century Theology. Westminster John Knox Press. ISBN 978-0-664-25151-2.
- Coalter, Milton J.; Mulder, John M.; Weeks, Louis, eds. (January 1, 1992). The Pluralistic Vision: Presbyterians and Mainstream Protestant Education and Leadership. Westminster John Knox Press. ISBN 978-0-664-25243-4.
- Coffin, Henry Sloane (1954). A Half Century of Union Theological Seminary, 1896-1945: An Informal History. Scribner.
- Gundlach, Bradley J. (2019). "The Fundamentalist–Modernist Controversy". In Smith, Gary Scott; Kemeny, P. C. (eds.). The Oxford Handbook of Presbyterianism. New York: Oxford University Press. ISBN 978-0-19-060840-8.
- Hart, Darryl G. (2003). Defending the Faith: J. Gresham Machen and the Crisis of Conservative Protestantism in Modern America. P & R. ISBN 978-0-87552-563-1.
- Holm, April E. (December 11, 2017). A Kingdom Divided: Evangelicals, Loyalty, and Sectionalism in the Civil War Era. LSU Press. ISBN 978-0-8071-6772-4.
- Larson, Edward J. (June 16, 2020). Summer for the Gods: The Scopes Trial and America's Continuing Debate Over Science and Religion. Basic Books. ISBN 978-1-5416-4602-5.
- Loetscher, Lefferts Augustine (1954). The Broadening Church. University of Penn. Press.
- Longfield, Bradley J. (1991). The Presbyterian Controversy: Fundamentalists, Modernists, and Moderates. Oxford University Press. ISBN 978-0-19-508674-4.
- Kazin, Michael (March 13, 2007). A Godly Hero: The Life of William Jennings Bryan. Knopf Doubleday Publishing Group. ISBN 978-0-385-72056-4.
- Macartney, Clarence Edward Noble (1961). The Making of a Minister: The Autobiography of Clarence E. Macartney. Channel Press.
- Machen, J. Gresham (1923). Christianity and Liberalism.
- Marsden, George M. (1994). Understanding Fundamentalism and Evangelicalism. William B. Eerdmans. ISBN 9780802805393.
- Miller, Robert Moats (1985). Harry Emerson Fosdick: Preacher, Pastor, Prophet. New York: Oxford University Press. ISBN 0-19-503512-7.
- North, Gary (1996). Crossed Fingers: How the Liberals Captured the Presbyterian Church. Institute for Christian Economics. ISBN 978-0-930464-74-5.
- Noyes, Morgan Phelps (1964). Henry Sloane Coffin: The Man and His Ministry. Scribner.
- Olasky, Marvin N.; Perry, John (2005). Monkey Business: The True Story of the Scopes Trial. B&H Publishing Group. ISBN 978-0-8054-3157-5.
- Rian, Edwin H. (1940). The Presbyterian Conflict.
- Ryan, Halford R. (February 17, 1989). Harry Emerson Fosdick: Persuasive Preacher. Bloomsbury Academic. ISBN 978-0-313-25897-8.
- Sandeen, Ernest R. (1978). The Roots of Fundamentalism: British and American Millenarianism, 1800-1930. University of Chicago Press. ISBN 0-8010-8147-5.
- Selden, William K. (1992). Princeton Theological Seminary: A Narrative History, 1812-1992. Princeton University Press. ISBN 978-0-9634444-0-0.
- Smylie, James H. (October 1, 1996). A Brief History of the Presbyterians. Geneva Press. ISBN 978-1-61164-453-1.
- Sweeney, Douglas A. (2005). The American Evangelical Story: A History of the Movement. Grand Rapids, Michigan: Baker Academic. ISBN 0-8010-2658-X.
- Toulouse, Mark G. (1985). The Transformation of John Foster Dulles: From Prophet of Realism to Priest of Nationalism. Mercer University Press. ISBN 0-86554-160-4.
- Utzinger, J. Michael (2006). Yet Saints Their Watch are Keeping: Fundamentalists, Modernists, and the Development of Evangelical Ecclesiology, 1887-1937. Mercer University Press. ISBN 978-0-86554-902-9.
- van der Krogt, Christopher J. (2014). "The Rise of Fundamentalisms". In Hedges, Paul (ed.). Controversies in Contemporary Religion. Vol. 3. Santa Barbara, California: Praeger Publishing.
