= Union Rescue Mission =

Homeless shelter in California

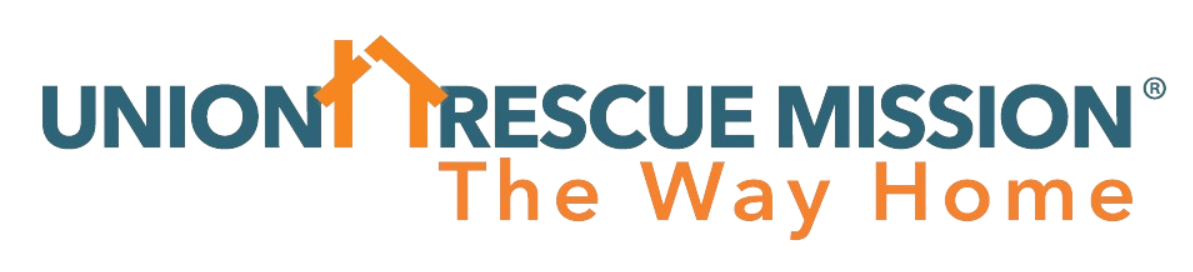

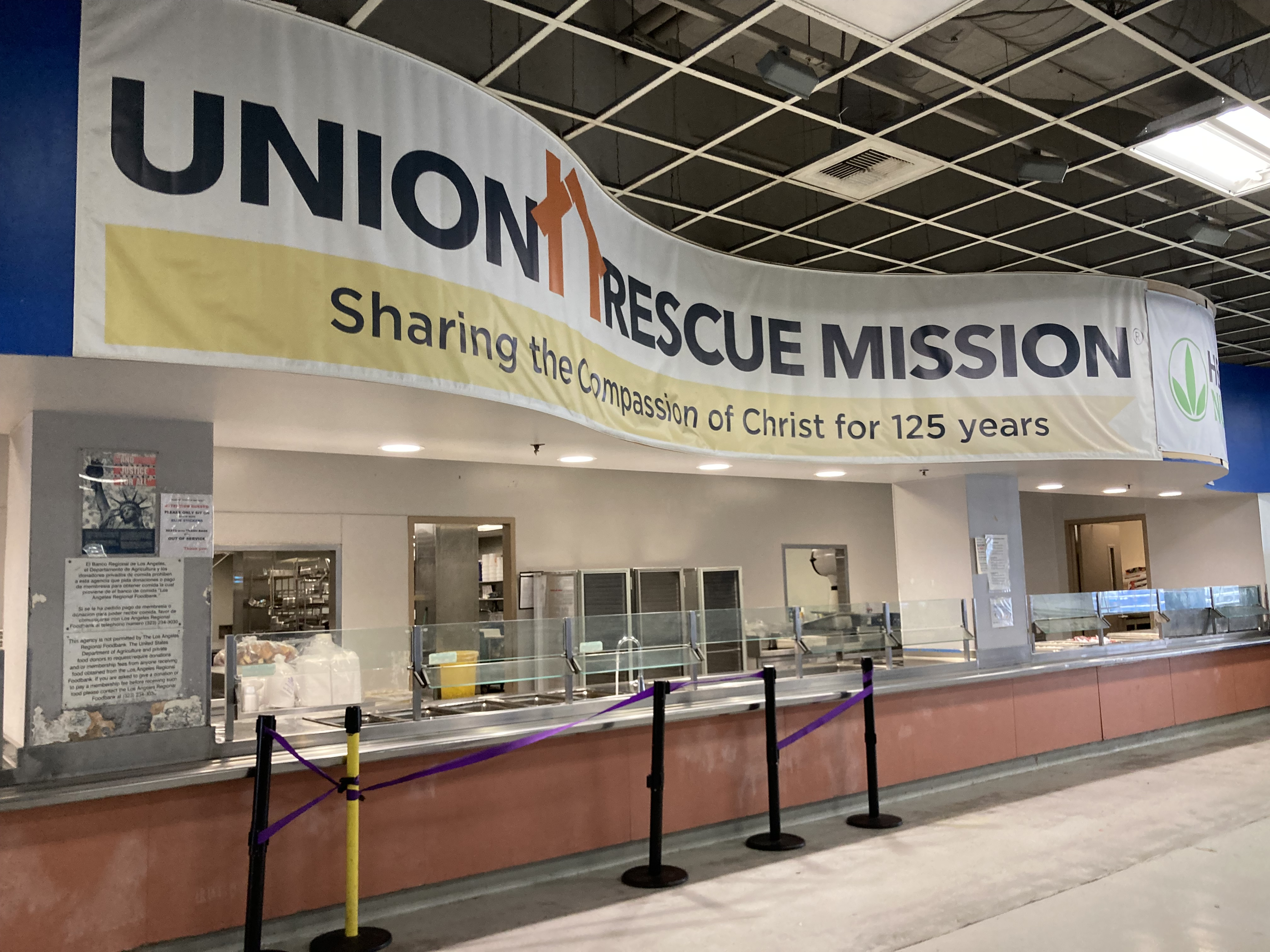
- The shelter's cafeteria in 2023

- Location within the Los Angeles metropolitan area Location within California Location within the United States

General information
- Location: 545 San Pedro St, Los Angeles, CA 90013
- Coordinates: 34.0433°N 118.2449°W
- Opened: 1994; 32 years ago
- Cost: $29 million
- Owner: Union Rescue Mission

Technical details
- Floor area: 225,000 sq ft (20,900 m^{2})

Website
- urm.org

The Union Rescue Mission, commonly abbreviated as the URM, is a Christian homeless shelter in the Skid Row neighborhood of Los Angeles, California. It is the oldest in the city and the largest private homeless shelter in the United States. The organization behind the URM is a 501(c)(3) nonprofit that was established in 1891.

== History ==
The United Rescue Mission was founded on December 4, 1891, by Lyman Stewart, a businessman who co-founded the Union Oil Company of California and Biola University. It was originally known as the Pacific Gospel Union and its first superintendent was George A. Hilton. During its beginnings in the late 19th century, it pitched temporary tents that served the homeless, later purchasing a permanent residence at 145 N Main St. in 1907. The property was bought by city officials in 1926 to build the Los Angeles City Hall, causing the URM to buy another building at 226 S Main St., nicknamed "The Mansion on Main Street". The Main St. location was demolished and became a parking lot next to the Cathedral of Saint Vibiana.

The mission supplied nearly half (42%) of all free meals provided by private charities in the city during the Great Depression. It opened its current 225,000 sq ft (20,900 m^{2}) facility in 1994. In 2005, many hospitals in the area, including one from Las Vegas, consistently dropped their patients on URM's doorstep. They justified their action by saying that "it [the URM] was the only place in Southern California with a concentration of patient social services like homeless shelters and drug and alcohol programs."

The center suffered greatly during the beginning of the COVID-19 pandemic, with a hundred positive cases and two deaths in just the first two months of lockdown. Space had to be limited to 550-600 people per night during this time. However, the next year was more forgiving, as URM coordinated with the Los Angeles County Fire Department and the Los Angeles County Department of Public Health and even became a distributor of the COVID-19 vaccine.

In 2020, Hudson Pacific Properties, a real estate investment trust, pledged $500,000 to URM as a part of the company's efforts to give back to the communities and combat homelessness.

== Facility ==
The building, which opened in 1994, contains a chapel, library, playground, gymnasium, and a learning center with computers. It can shelter about a thousand people per night. The fourth floor contains the Bank of America Learning Center, which offers basic education on literacy, computer training, and high school diplomas. In 2007, an Internet café, the first one in Skid Row, opened on the first floor.

Pepperdine University's Graduate School of Education & Psychology operates a mental health clinic free of charge in the shelter. Their Legal Aid Clinic also provides free legal services to the homeless.

== Leadership ==
The Rev. Andy Bales was appointed president of the mission in 2005 and became chief executive in 2007. He retired in 2023.

== Events ==
An annual tradition at the Union Rescue Mission is the deep frying of 300 turkeys to feed to the residents as a Thanksgiving meal. 600 residents will have a sit-down dinner, while the nonresidents will be given food outside.

Actors from the soap opera The Bold and the Beautiful joined a 5K run in June 2020 to help raise money for the mission.

The Los Angeles Rams' Community Service Team, cheerleaders, and their mascot Rampage volunteered to prepare and hand out meals at the shelter in December 2018.

== Related organizations ==
The Victory Service Club was founded in 1942 and it helped support soldiers spiritually during wars. In 1980, the Bethel Haven Women and Family Shelter was created to combat the increase in the number of women and children in the homeless population.

Hope Gardens Family Center, which opened in 2006 in the foothills of the neighborhood of Sylmar, is a 71 acres (29 ha) residence exclusively for single women. URM also owns two thrift stores in Covina and Whittier. The Angeles House, a facility for families, was opened in 2022.
