= Marjoe =

1972 documentary film

- Theatrical release poster
- Directed by: Howard Smith; Sarah Kernochan
- Produced by: Howard Smith; Sarah Kernochan
- Starring: Marjoe Gortner
- Edited by: Lawrence Silk
- Distributed by: Cinema 5 Distributing
- Release date: July 24, 1972
- Running time: 88 minutes
- Country: United States
- Language: English

Marjoe is a 1972 American documentary film directed and produced by Howard Smith and Sarah Kernochan about Pentecostal preacher Marjoe Gortner, who was ordained as a preacher at only age four and became an evangelist sensation in the 1940s.

Made with the knowledge and consent of Gortner, who, now in his late twenties, regrets the many lies he had been taught to preach as a child evangelist, documents his story and preachings that often leave church-goers in states of fervent euphoria, and culminate in money donations. While Gortner privately explains to the film crew the often-deceptive methods of many evangelists, most of the individuals featured, evangelists and church-goers alike, are unaware of the film's true aim of exposing exploitation and deception within evangelism.

Considered a pioneering film in the documentation of deception in evangelism, the film won the Academy Award for Best Documentary Feature at the 45th Academy Awards, and was nominated for the Golden Globe Award for Best Documentary Film. It was long considered a lost film, until it was recovered in 2002, leading to its subsequent restoration and preservation.

== Story ==
Marjoe Gortner was a child preacher, who was popular in the American South starting in 1949. His parents earned large sums of money from his preaching; Gortner speculated their take to be in the millions. The novelty of Gortner's youthfulness wore off at age 14, causing his father to leave. At 16, he decided to stop preaching and left his mother.

Gortner rejoined the ministry as a young adult solely as a means of earning a living, not as a believer. He spent the next several years using his fame and status as an evangelist to earn a living from both tent revivals and televangelism. In his late 20s, Gortner suffered a crisis of conscience of sorts and decided to give up the revival circuit, but not any of the money he made from it. He offered a documentary film crew unrestricted access to him during his final revival tour, which took place in 1971.

The film contains scenes from revival meetings showing Gortner preaching and praying for people in Los Angeles, Fort Worth, Detroit, and Anaheim. This is interspersed with footage of Gortner admitting on camera that he was a non-believer and revealing the tactics that he and other evangelists used to manipulate people and to move them during revivals. Some of the evangelists even revealed where they bought properties kept secret and gave him advice to follow. Gortner said he studied Mick Jagger of the Rolling Stones, as a model for his routine.

== Release ==
At the time of the film's release, it generated considerable press, but the movie was not shown widely in theaters in the Southern United States. The distributor feared adverse reaction to the film in the Bible Belt.

== Soundtrack ==
A soundtrack was released by Warner Bros. Records, consisting of sermons and spoken word segments by Marjoe (from age four), intermixed with songs. "Save All My Brothers", the film's theme song, was written by Sarah Kernochan and Joseph Brooks, who also arranged it, and it was sung by Jerry Keller.

== Rediscovery and re-release ==
Although released on VHS, the film had long been out of print and had deteriorated. In 2002 the negative and other elements were found in a vault in New York City. The Academy Film Archive preserved Marjoe in 2005. On November 15, 2005, in New York City, the IFC Center showed Marjoe as the closing film in a series of documentaries called "Stranger Than Fiction". The restored film has since been released on DVD and streaming services.

== Awards ==
The film won the 1972 Academy Award for Best Documentary Feature.

== See also ==
- List of American films of 1972
- Jesus Camp
- List of rediscovered films
- Child preacher
