= Marjoe Gortner =

American actor and evangelist (1944–2026)

- Gortner in 1973
- Born: Hugh Marjoe Ross Gortner; January 14, 1944; Long Beach, California, U.S.
- Died: October 2, 2026 (aged 82); Santa Fe, New Mexico, U.S.
- Occupations: Christian revivalist; actor
- Years active: 1948–1995
- Spouses: Carol Joan Raney (m. 1960–1968) Agnes Benjamin (m. 1971, divorced) Candy Clark (m. 1978; div. 1979) Susan Magestro (m. 2019)

Hugh Marjoe Ross Gortner (January 14, 1944 – October 2, 2026) was an American evangelist preacher and actor. He first gained public attention during the late 1940s when his parents arranged for him to be ordained as a preacher at age four due to his extraordinary speaking ability, making him the youngest known in that position to this day. As a young man, he preached on the revival circuit and brought celebrity to the revival movement.

As an adult, Gortner, having grown regretful, admitted that his days as a child evangelist were filled with fake stories, lies and the sales of fake holy or healing items. Marjoe (1972) is a behind-the-scenes documentary about him and the lucrative business of Pentecostal preaching, in which he actively participated. The film won the Academy Award for Best Documentary Feature Film, and it became known as a prominent criticism of Pentecostal preaching. Gortner had an acting career from the 1970s to the 1990s, which included a main role in the space opera film Starcrash (1978) and guest spots on several TV series, and also released a musical studio album titled Bad but Not Evil in 1972.

== Early life ==
Hugh Marjoe Ross Gortner was born in Long Beach, California, on January 14, 1944, into a family with a long evangelical heritage. The name Marjoe is a portmanteau of the biblical names Mary and Joseph. (Note: The formation of his name from combining the names of Mary and Joseph is alluded to in numerous sources; however, some early sources state that he was named for his mother, Marge. cf. His brother's name, Vernoe, father, Vernon; and sister's name, Starloe.) His father, Vernon Robert Gortner, was a third-generation Christian evangelical minister who preached at revivals. His mother Marge, who has been described as "exuberant", was the person who introduced him as a preacher, and is notable for his success as a child. Vernon noticed his son's talent for mimicry and his fearlessness of strangers and public settings. His parents claimed the boy had received a vision from God during a bath, and he started preaching. Marjoe later said that was a fictional story that his parents forced him to repeat. He claimed they compelled him to do that by using mock-drowning episodes; they did not beat him as they did not want to leave bruises that might be noticed during his many public appearances.

They trained him to deliver sermons, complete with dramatic gestures and emphatic lunges. When he was four, his parents arranged for him to perform a marriage ceremony attended by the press, including photographers from Life and Paramount studios. (Note: The ceremony was performed on January 2, just 12 days before Gortner's fifth birthday, leading to differing reports as to his age.) Until his teenage years, Gortner and his parents traveled throughout the United States holding revival meetings, and by 1951 his younger brother Vernoe had been incorporated into the act.

By the time he was sixteen, his family had amassed what he later estimated to be three million dollars. Shortly after Gortner's sixteenth birthday, his father absconded with the money.

== Career ==
Gortner spent the remainder of his teenage years as an itinerant beatnik.

In the late 1960s, Gortner experienced a crisis of conscience about his double life. He decided his performing talents might be put to use as an actor or singer. When approached by documentarians Howard Smith and Sarah Kernochan, he agreed to let their film crew follow him throughout 1971 on a final tour of revival meetings in California, Texas, and Michigan.

Unknown to everyone involved — including, at one point, his father — he gave backstage interviews to the filmmakers between sermons and revivals, some including other preachers, explaining intimate details of how he and other ministers operated. The filmmakers also shot footage of him later in his hotel room while counting the money he had collected during the day. The resulting film, Marjoe, won the 1972 Academy Award for Best Documentary.

He capitalized on the success of the documentary. Oui magazine hired him to cover Millennium '73, a November 1973 festival headlined by the boy guru Guru Maharaj Ji. He cut an LP with Chelsea Records titled Bad, but Not Evil, named after his description of himself in the documentary.

Gortner began his acting career with a featured role in The Marcus-Nelson Murders, the 1973 pilot for the Kojak television series. In 1974, he made several appearances in film and television. In the disaster film Earthquake, he was Sgt. Jody Joad, a psychotic grocery manager-turned-National Guardsman, the main antagonist.

He portrayed the psychopathic, hostage-taking drug dealer in Milton Katselas's 1979 screen adaptation of Mark Medoff's play When You Comin' Back, Red Ryder? He starred in a number of B-movies including Bobbie Jo and the Outlaw (1976), The Food of the Gods (1976), and Starcrash (1978).

In the early 1980s, Gortner hosted the short-lived reality TV series, Speak Up, America. He also appeared frequently in the 1980s Circus of the Stars specials. He also played a terrorist preacher in a second-season episode of Airwolf, and appeared on Falcon Crest as corrupt psychic-cum-medium "Vince Karlotti" (1986–1987). His last role was as a preacher in the western Wild Bill (1995).

In 1984, Gortner directed a major photo-fumetti, "Biblical Vision", for the American pornography magazine Hustler.

In 2008, the Melbourne Underground Film Festival in Melbourne, Australia, held the first retrospective of Gortner's roles as part of its ninth festival.

=== Music career ===
Gortner recorded an album, Bad but Not Evil which was released on the Chelsea Records label in 1972. It included the songs, "Hoe-Bus", "The Ballad of Spider John", "Lo And Behold!", "Wind Up", "I'm a Man", "Collection Box", "Glory Glory Hallelujah", "I Shall Be Released", and "Faith Healing Remedy (Jesus Is Your Friend)". Vocal backing was by Maxine Waters, Gwen Johnson, Clydie King and Venetta Fields, etc. The musicians included Tom Scott, Joe Osborn, Hal Blaine and Michael Omartian. It was reviewed in Billboard's November 18 issue that year with the reviewer saying he was off to a flying start with a Bob Dylan composition, "Lo and Behold". The reviewer also called it a strong debut. The other songs noted as highlights were "Hoe-Bus", "Glory Glory Hallelujah", and another Dylan composition, "I Shall Be Released". The single "Lo And Behold!" also attracted attention.

In 2007, the Philadelphia Live Arts Festival commissioned actor and writer Brian Osborne to write a one-man play about Gortner. The play, The Word, premiered at the Festival with Suli Holum as director and main collaborator. In 2010, the play was recreated as The Word: A House Party for Jesus, with director Whit MacLaughlin. The play opened October 14, 2010 in Philadelphia, Pennsylvania, and has been performed in New York (the Soho Playhouse), Los Angeles, Philadelphia (the 2011 NET Festival), and Pittsburgh, Pennsylvania (the Kelly-Strayhorn Theater).

== Personal life and death ==
Gortner's first marriage was to Carol Raney on May 27, 1960, in Reno, Nevada.

Gortner married Virginia Humphreys on April 1, 1968, in Las Vegas.

In 1971, Gortner married Agnes Benjamin, who had appeared in his documentary.

From 1978 to December 14, 1979, Gortner was married to actress Candy Clark.

He married Susan Magestro in 2019 in Santa Fe, New Mexico.

Gortner died from congestive heart failure in Santa Fe on October 2, 2026, at the age of 82.

== Filmography ==
Year	Title	Role	Notes
1972	Marjoe	himself	Documentary
1972–74	The Merv Griffin Show	self	2 episodes
1973	Police Story	Stanley	Episode: "Requiem for an Informer"
1973	The Marcus-Nelson Murders	Teddy Hopper	TV movie and Kojak pilot
1973	The Mike Douglas Show	self	Episode #12.226
1973–79	The Tonight Show Starring Johnny Carson	self	2 episodes
1973	ABC Late Night	self – host	Episode: "Marjoe's Country: Nashville"
1974	Medical Center	David	Episode: "Demi-God"
1974	Nakia		Episode: "The Moving Target"
1974	Barnaby Jones	David Colton	Episode: "A Gold Record for Murder"
1974	Pray for the Wildcats	Terry Maxon	ABC Movie of the Week
1974	The Gun and the Pulpit	Ernie Parsons	ABC Movie of the Week
1974	Earthquake	Jody Joad	
1976	Bobbie Jo and the Outlaw	Lyle Wheeler	
1976	Acapulco Gold	Ralph Hollio	
1976	The Food of the Gods	Morgan	
1976	Mayday at 40,000 Feet!	Greco	TV movie
1976	Break the Bank	self	game show – 4 episodes
1977	Viva Knievel!	Jessie	
1977	Sidewinder 1	Digger	
1978	Starcrash	Akton	
1977–78	Laugh-In	Guest (uncredited)	2 episodes
1979	When You Comin' Back, Red Ryder?	Teddy	
1979–87	Circus of the Stars	self	5 episodes
1980	The Robber Bridegroom	Jamie Lockhart	
1980	The Alan Thicke Show	self	Episode #1.65
1980	Speak Up, America	self – host	2 episodes
1981–83	Fantasy Island	Lorin Robertson/Nick Corbin	2 episodes
1983	Whiz Kids	Bobby Lee Janz	Episode: "Return of the Big Rocker"
1983	Celebrity Daredevils	self	
1983	Mausoleum	Oliver Farrell	
1983	The A-Team	Tom Anderson	Episode: "Recipe for Heavy Bread"
1983–85	T. J. Hooker	Jack Lewis/Marino	2 episodes
1984	Matt Houston	Christian Dean	Episode: "The Secret Admirer"
1984	Jungle Warriors	Larry Schecter	
1985	Half Nelson	Dexter Breen	Episode: "The Beverly Hills Princess"
1985	Hotel	Frank Brenner	Episode: "Images"
1985	Otherworld	Chalktrauma	Episode: "Village of the Motorpigs"
1985	Street Hawk	Joseph Cannon	Episode: "The Adjuster"
1985	Airwolf	Johann Rector	Episode: "Dambreakers"
1985	Hellhole	Dr. Dane	
1986–87	Falcon Crest	Vince Karlotti	17 episodes
1987	The Survivalist	Lieutenant Youngman	
1989	American Ninja 3: Blood Hunt	'The Cobra'	
1990	Fire, Ice and Dynamite	Dan Selby	
1995	Wild Bill	Preacher	

== See also ==
- Al Sharpton – another well-known child preacher
- Child preacher
