= Algernon J. Pollock =

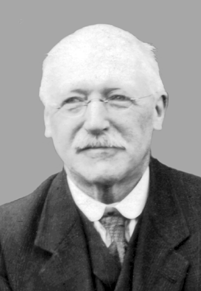
Portrait of Algernon James Pollock

Algernon James Pollock (14 October 1864 – 5 January 1957) was an evangelist and writer from the Plymouth Brethren movement.

== Life ==
Pollock was born in Newcastle-upon-Tyne. He made a profession of faith in Christ at the age of 11, and was introduced to John Nelson Darby at the age of 15. Pollock married Elsie Madeleine (née Seton) May 8, 1901. Together, they had three sons and one daughter. He left his occupation as a banker to become a full-time evangelist and apologist, contributing articles to the Scripture Truth magazine and writing more than fifty pamphlets and several books to defend against ideas contrary to what he perceived as orthodox Christianity. Pollock was also editor of the "Gospel Tidings" hymnbook and The Gospel Messenger magazine, and his essay on "Modern Spiritualism" was condensed for inclusion in The Fundamentals. He also had his pamphlet on Christadelphianism condensed for inclusion in the well known apologetical work Heresies Exposed, which was edited by William C. Irvine.

== Selected publications ==
- Heresies Exposed (contributor)
- The Journey and Its End
- Seventh-day Adventism: Briefly Tested by Scripture
- The British–Israel theory: Briefly Tested by Scripture
- Christian Science: Briefly Tested by Scripture
- Christadelphianism: Briefly Tested by Scripture
- Millennial Dawnism: Briefly Tested by Scripture
- Things Which Must Shortly Come to Pass
- The Oxford Group Movement: Its Doctrines, Its Practices, Its Founder, Conclusions
- Modern Pentecostalism, Foursquare Gospel, "Healings" and "Tongues": Are They of God?
- Baptismal Regeneration: Is It Scriptural?
- The Amazing Jew
- The Tabernacle's Typical Teaching (1921) ISBN 0-901860-65-4
- Reasons Why A Christian Should Not Be A Freemason (1900)
