= William C. Irvine (missionary) =

New Zealand missionary and writer

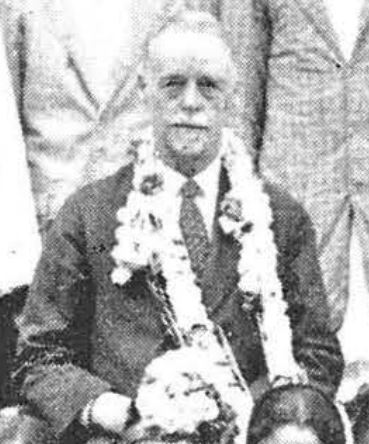
- From the frontispiece of 25 Years' Mission Work Among the Lepers of India
- Born: 3 June 1871; New Zealand
- Died: 5 September 1946 (aged 75); India
- Occupations: Missionary and author
- Notable work: Heresies Exposed (also known as Timely Warnings and Modern Heresies Exposed)

William Carleton Irvine (3 June 1871 – 5 September 1946) was a missionary, writer, and the founding editor of the Indian Christian magazine.

== Biography ==
Irvine was a superintendent of Belgaum Leprosy Hospital at Hindalga for 25 years. He came to India from New Zealand.

His best known work is Timely Warnings (1917), which has been called the first modern Christian countercult book, also known as Modern Heresies Exposed in its second edition and as Heresies Exposed subsequent to the 1921 edition. His books 25 Years' Mission Work Among the Lepers of India, Riches of the Gentiles and other works also received wide distribution. Heresies Exposed was one of the first widely available books to critically review new religious movements such as Christian Scientists, Jehovah's Witnesses, Seventh Day Adventists, Cooneyites, Christadelphians, Pentecostals, Theosophists and other non-mainstream groups that came to increasing prominence during the 20th century. By 1955 it had seen twenty-nine editions and printings, and remains in print today.

== Publications ==
- Heresies Exposed. 1st Edition 1917, (published as Timely Warnings), 2nd edition 1919 (published as Modern Heresies Exposed), 3rd edition 1921 (as Heresies Exposed), 4th edition 1923 (ditto), fifth edition 1927 (Rewritten and Enlarged), 6th edition 1929 (again enlarged), 7th edition 1930 (again enlarged), reprint 1932, 8th edition 1935 (Revised and Enlarged), 9th edition 1937, 10th edition 1935 (reprinted in USA), 11th edition 1941 (reprinted in India), 12th edition 1942 (reprinted in India), 1955, 1985
- 25 Years' Mission Work Among the Lepers of India (1938)

== See also ==
- Christian Apologetics
- Christian mission
- Algernon J. Pollock
