= Lyman Stewart =

American businessman and philanthropist

- Lyman Stewart
- Born: July 22, 1840; Cherrytree, Pennsylvania
- Died: September 28, 1923 (aged 83); Los Angeles, California
- Occupations: Businessman, philanthropist
- Known for: Founding Biola University, supporting fundamentalism
- Notable work: The Fundamentals (financed)
- Spouse(s): Sarah Adalaide Burrows (m. 1867-1912 her death), Lula May Crowell (m. 1916)
- Parent(s): William Reynolds Stewart & Jane Miller Irwin
- Relatives: Milton Stewart

Lyman Stewart (July 22, 1840 – September 28, 1923) was a U.S. businessman and co-founder of Union Oil Company of California. Stewart was also a significant Christian philanthropist and cofounder of the Bible Institute of Los Angeles, now known as Biola University. He and his brother Milton also anonymously funded publication of The Fundamentals, the foundation document of Christian fundamentalism. Stewart also helped found the Union Rescue Mission in Los Angeles.

== Early life ==
Stewart was born to William Reynolds Stewart & Jane Miller Irwin on July 22, 1840, in rural Cherrytree in Venango County, Pennsylvania and after the age of eleven he dropped out of school and went to work for his father's tanning business. Stewart converted to Presbyterian Christianity during the "Businessman's Revival" of 1857, and later became a premillennialist. When Edwin Drake discovered oil near Titusville, Pennsylvania, in 1859, Stewart tried drilling wells in the same area. After two disastrous attempts, he served a three-year enlistment in the 16th Pennsylvania Cavalry during the American Civil War.

== Oil career ==
After the war, Stewart again tried to drill for oil, but he was still unsuccessful. In 1877, Stewart was introduced to Wallace Hardison (a relative of one of his friends). Hardison agreed to financially support Stewart, so they purchased some land where they hoped to find oil. They enjoyed some moderate success. When John D. Rockefeller started to consolidate oil holdings in the eastern U.S., Hardison and Stewart sold their interests to Standard Oil and moved to California.

Stewart and his partner found the success they sought in California. By 1886, the Hardison and Stewart Oil Company was responsible for 15% of all oil production in California. In 1890, they merged their interests with those of Thomas Bard and Paul Calonico to form the Union Oil Company. As president of Union Oil, Stewart heavily invested in new wells and expanded his company's market capitalization from $10 million in 1900 to over $50 million in 1908.

== Philanthropy ==
In 1891, Stewart founded the Pacific Gospel Mission, now known as the Union Rescue Mission.

In 1908, Stewart founded the Bible Institute of Los Angeles, now known as Biola University. It was supported by many of the same evangelical dispensationalists who would support Stewart's The Fundamentals project.

Lyman conceived of a publication to defend evangelical Christianity, and he and his brother Milton founded the Testimony Publishing Company and sold 3,000 Union Oil shares to be put towards the publication and distribution costs of the 12-volume The Fundamentals. These volumes established the precepts of Christian Fundamentalism. Stewart saw a crisis in Christianity. He had said to his brother of various Christian workers like preachers, teachers, missionaries, that they "do not know what they are teaching is error; they teach what they have been taught; they do not know any better." The Stewart brothers also financially supported missionary efforts in China and elsewhere.

In 1917, he donated $4,500 to fund the construction of Stewart Hall at Toccoa Falls College.

== Personal life ==
Lyman Stewart married Sarah Adalaide Burrows on 2 May 1867 in Enterprise, Pennsylvania. They had three children: William L., May, and Alfred C. Stewart's sons were actively involved in the oil business. As children, they helped their father rather than attend school. William stayed involved with Union Oil, working every position, eventually replacing his father as president of Union Oil. Alfred developed his mechanical aptitude while at Union Oil. He invented a multitude of drilling equipment. Alfred did not stay with Union Oil, he ran an automotive machine shop and continued inventing the most notable carburetors. Sarah died on 5 Feb 1912, in Los Angeles. On 26 Aug 1916, Lyman married Lula May Crowell. She had been his private secretary for the previous eleven years. She was a graduate of BIOLA and a fervent supporter of its mission.

Stewart was an active Republican ever since his enlistment in the Union Army in the American Civil War, but did not support William Howard Taft because he was a Unitarian, which Stewart saw as "an enemy of the cross of Christ."

Lyman Stewart died on September 28, 1923, at the age of 83, and was followed closely by his older brother Milton on November 20.

According to the Los Angeles Times, Stewart was “too well known to need an introduction” in his day, and he and his brother have been compared to the Koch brothers in the way they shaped American conservatism. Upon their deaths, The Missionary Review of the World compared the Stewart brothers to James and John or Peter and Andrew.

== See also ==
- Prosperity theology
- Fundamentalist–modernist controversy

== Bibliography ==
- Wills, Matthew (19 March 2022). "Lyman Stewart: Fundamentalist and Oligarch". JSTOR Daily.
