= Howard Smith (director) =

American screenwriter and director (1936-2014)

- Born: December 10, 1936; Brooklyn, New York, U.S.
- Died: May 1, 2014 (aged 77); New York, New York, U.S.
- Occupations: Journalist; film director
- Known for: producer and director of the 1972 Oscar-winning documentary film Marjoe; long-time columnist for The Village Voice newspaper; WPLJ-FM radio show host
- Spouse: Susan Calder Smith (divorced)
- Children: Cass Calder Smith; Zachary Charles Smith
- Parent(s): Charles Smith; Sadie Heitner Smith

Howard Smith (December 10, 1936 – May 1, 2014) was an American Oscar-winning film director, producer, journalist, screenwriter, actor and radio broadcaster.

== Biography ==
Smith was born in Brooklyn in 1936 and raised in Newark, New Jersey, where his parents, Charles and Sadie (née Heitner) Smith, owned a cigar store. His parents were Jewish immigrants from Eastern Europe. He was interested in inventions when he was a youngster. He graduated from Weequahic High School in 1955 and attended Pace College in New York City but left to write poetry. Smith started his career as a photographer. His work appeared in Life, Newsweek and many other national publications.

=== Journalist ===
Several years later, Smith pursued journalism from another perspective and became a writer for more than thirty years. His articles appeared in newspapers and magazines ranging from Playboy to The New York Times; from the Ladies Home Journal to The Village Voice.

He wrote regularly for the New York City based weekly newspaper, The Village Voice, in the 1960s and 1970s. One of his regular columns was "Scenes". Smith was hired by Village Voice co-founder Dan Wolf and continued to write for them until 1989.

During the Village Voice's early and formative years, his column, "Scenes", with its reporting on the emerging counterculture, became a part of the paper's groundbreaking new journalism. The column ran weekly for twenty years and became known for its cutting edge coverage and innovative short-form critiques. His work for the Village Voice is frequently cited as one of the highly influential examples of the new participatory journalism that made less rigid the distinction between the observer and the observed.

At the peak of the historic Stonewall Riots in New York City in 1969, he managed to get inside the now famous bar with his Village Voice reporter's police credentials. He was the only journalist who reported about the siege from that dangerous vantage point. He was later interviewed on this first-hand reporting in the 2010 documentary film, Stonewall Uprising.

=== Film producer and director ===
Smith produced and directed, with Sarah Kernochan, the Oscar-winning feature-length documentary film, Marjoe, in 1972, about the evangelist Marjoe Gortner. When it was first shown at the Cannes Film Festival it caught the attention of Roger Ebert. He followed up with a documentary film in 1977, called Gizmo!, about improbable inventions of modern times, caught on film. The film received wide distribution and acclaim.

=== Radio ===
In the 1960s and 1970s, Smith had a weekend overnight show on WPLJ FM radio in New York City, which was also syndicated nationally, where he conducted extensive in-depth interviews with well-known musicians and notable figures, as well as playing an eclectic mix of albums and songs in the "progressive" freeform rock music and Album-oriented rock formats.

He covered many of the tumultuous era's most known events including Woodstock, from which America heard his live radio reports, broadcast around the clock for five full days.

=== Lecturer and pundit ===
Smith became particularly well known for his insights into the growing influence and economic power of America's rapidly expanding youth culture. As a result, he frequently lectured and was a guest on many network television shows.

=== 1990s and beyond ===
In the early 1990s, Smith shifted his creative focus to concentrate his activities in the world of non-profit organizations. Amongst these, he was a board member, and Director of Operations for the Mood Disorders Support Group of New York (MDSG), a New York City organization helping people with depression, manic depression, and their families and friends.

His sister, Barbara Tripp, attributed the end of his writing career to his manic depression. He was writing a book about his involvement, as both participant and commentator, in the late 1950s beatnik scene, the explosive hippie 1960s, right through to the brouhaha that was to characterize the Nixonian mid-1970s.

On November 15, 2005, in New York City, the IFC Center showed Marjoe as the closing film in a series of documentaries called "Stranger Than Fiction". In their program they called it "a lost gem".

Smith had kept the original audio reels in his loft, until his son Cass Calder Smith discovered them. He took them to New York filmmaker and artist Ezra Bookstein, who decided to ready the tapes for release after 45 years. In 2012-13, a selection of digitized uncut interviews from 1969 to 1972 were released as digital downloads and as a limited edition CD box set. The collection featured full length audio interviews with many influential artists of the day, including Lou Reed, John Lennon and Yoko Ono, Eric Clapton and Jim Morrison. Additionally, digital albums are distributed via iTunes.

Several interviews were released on a monthly basis, culminating in the release of the CD box including twelve CDs and a USB drive with five hours of additional audio. A second box set, "I'm Not the Beatles: The John & Yoko interviews 1969-72 with Howard Smith" features all 5 of their interviews on 8CDs and was released in 2014. A comprehensive book of interview transcripts was published in 2015 by Princeton Architectural Press. The Limited Edition box set was nominated for a 2014 Grammy Award for Best Boxed or Special Limited Edition Package for its art director, Masaki Koike.

== Personal life ==
Smith was the divorced father of two sons. He died of cancer on May 1, 2014, in Manhattan, aged 77.
