= Duffey Strode =

Former American street preacher

- Born: Ryan Duffey Strode; May 25, 1977 (age 48); United States
- Occupation: Street preacher
- Spouse: Kim Ellington (m. 1997)

Ryan Duffey Strode (born May 25, 1977) is an American former street preacher who, as a 10-year-old child, became the subject of nationwide controversy in the 1980s for his idiosyncratic style of preaching. Strode's sermons were characterized by bellowing rote-learned excerpts from the Bible, in particular those pertaining to Hell and sin.

== Life ==
Duffey Strode was raised by David and Robin Strode in the mountains of North Carolina with his younger sister, Pepper, and brother, Matthew. David Strode had been arrested several times for his own street preaching; he and Robin were homophobic and anti-Catholic in their beliefs. The family relocated to Marion, North Carolina, from Chambersburg, Pennsylvania, after David Strode was arrested five times for his street preaching.

Duffey Strode and his family made national news in 1988 after then-10-year-old Duffey, 6-year-old Pepper and 5-year-old Matthew began preaching outside their school, Eastfield Elementary School. David Strode told reporters his children's preaching was necessitated by racial integration, the teaching of evolution and sex education in public schools. Duffey was suspended from school five times during the 1987–88 school year. In May 1988, five hundred residents of Marion signed a petition asking that the family obey school rules or move out of town. The children's idiosyncratic style of preaching consisted of shouting biblical passages concerning Christian views of Hell and sin at their classmates. In the summer of 1988, Strode appeared on The Oprah Winfrey Show, Larry King Live, multiple times on Sally, and at least 14 other television talk-show hosts sought interviews with the preaching children who had become a source of controversy in their mountain town. On the first day of the 1988–89 school year, Strode was suspended again when he told the school principal to go to Hell.

After six months of media attention and many school suspensions, Strode's parents agreed to keep their children away from the school and educate the three themselves.

=== Later life ===
At 16 years old, Strode took a job at a Wendy's fast-food restaurant and began being exposed to secular influences; to his family's dismay, he began wearing a hat backwards and listening to popular music. He began dating Kim Ellington, a girl who attended New Manna Baptist Church, the Marion, North Carolina, megachurch that had previously thrown the Strode family out. He left home in June 1997 to live with a punk rocker friend and the Strode family would not speak to him for 10 months. In November 1997, Duffey and Ellington, then aged 20 and 19 years, respectively, were married at the Marion Community Center, where the Strode family had once faced hundreds of angry townspeople at a filming of The Sally Jessy Raphael Show. David, Robin, Pepper, and Matthew Strode did not attend the wedding.

As of January 2003, Strode was a factory worker.
