= E. J. Pace =

American Christian cartoonist (1880-1946)

Ernest James Pace (1880-1946) was one of the earliest American Christian comics pioneers. He was born in Columbus, Ohio in 1880.

== Background ==
Pace was converted by Church of the Brethren evangelists in 1899. He graduated from Otterbein University in 1905. Following graduation from Otterbein, Pace left to serve as a missionary to the Philippines from November 1905 to September 1910. While on missionary furlough, Pace attended Bonebrake Theological Seminary. He returned to the Philippines in April 1912 and served until March 1915. While serving in the Philippines, he edited and illustrated a weekly newspaper to convert Filipino Catholics to Protestant fundamentalism.

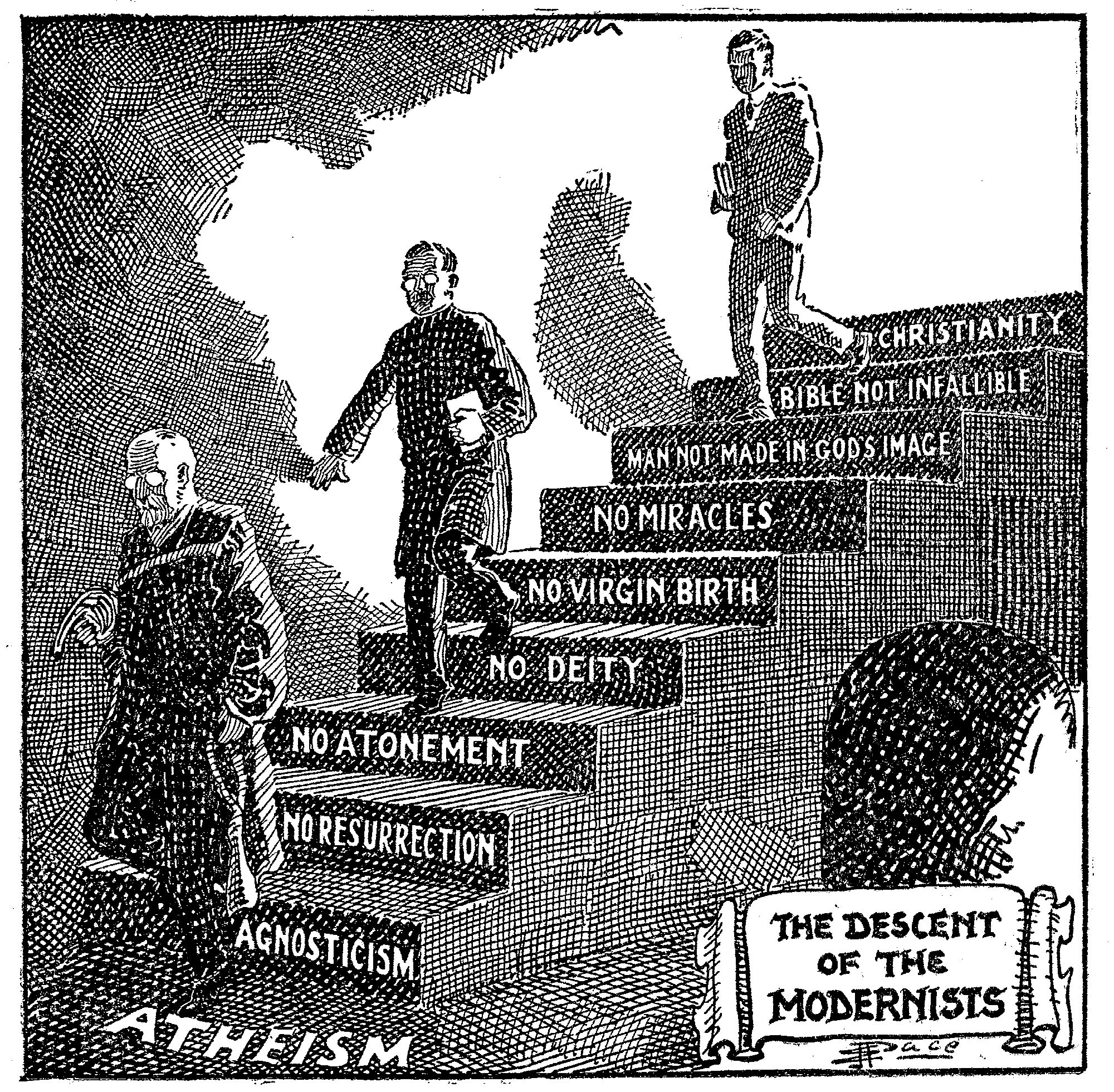
"The Descent of the Modernists", by Ernest James Pace, 1924.

After returning from the mission field, Pace joined the staff of Moody Bible Institute in Chicago, Illinois in 1917, where he served on the magazine board covering missionary news. Not long after, he transferred to the Institute's field extension department and moved to Orlando, Florida in 1921.

== Cartoons ==
As the head cartoonist for the Sunday School Times, Pace published editorial cartoons in the paper every week until his death in 1946. His cartoons often appeared with Bible passages, visually interpreting fundamentalist scripture lessons. His work set the standard for Protestant sequential-art, presenting coded visuals that supported particular interpretations.

Pace's cartoons appeared in William Jennings Bryan's 1924 book Seven Questions in Dispute. The frontispiece to the book includes a cartoon entitled "The Descent of the Modernists", depicting modernist scholars descending a staircase, each step a theological compromise leading them to the basement of unbelief. At a time when Christian fundamentalism arose as a reaction to a perceived threat to traditional Protestant beliefs, Pace sought to show modernists taking steps to atheism by questioning the infallibility of the Bible.

== Works ==
- Christian Cartoons. Chicago: The Bible Institute Colportage Association, 1922.

== See also ==
- Fundamentalist–modernist controversy
