= Milton Stewart =

American businessman, oil investor, and Christian fundamentalist

- Milton Stewart
- Born: September 24, 1838; Cherrytree, Pennsylvania
- Died: November 20, 1923 (aged 85)
- Occupations: Businessman, philanthropist
- Known for: Supporting fundamentalism
- Notable work: The Fundamentals (financed)
- Parent(s): William Reynolds Stewart & Jane Miller Irwin
- Relatives: Lyman Stewart

Milton Stewart (24 September 1838 — 20 November 1923) was an American businessman, oil investor, and Christian fundamentalist who, along with his brother Lyman Stewart, played an important role in the publication of The Fundamentals, from which fundamentalism gets its name.

== Life ==
Stewart was born in Cherrytree, Pennsylvania on September 24, 1838, to William R. and Jane M. Stewart. He had a public school education in Pennsylvania and graduated from Allegheny College. Stewart taught in public schools for a year and planned to go into agriculture in Ohio. Stewart was in Pennsylvania when the first oil well in the United States was drilled there, and became an early investor in drilling. He was one of the largest shareholders in Union Oil Company, now known as Unocal.

Milton and his brother Lyman contributed $300,000 towards the publication of The Fundamentals which were distributed around the world. The brothers were at first not identified publicly, and book was sent out with the note "Compliments of Two Christian Laymen." Milton Stewart also contributed to the Bible Institute of Los Angeles, known as Biola University, founded by his brother Lyman.

Milton Stewart was more interested in funding missionary work than his brother Lyman.

Milton Stewart died at 85 years old on 20 November 1923, two months after his brother Lyman. Upon their deaths, The Missionary Review of the World compared the Stewart brothers to James and John or Peter and Andrew.

R. A. Torrey, one of the editors of The Fundamentals, dedicated a book to Milton Stewart.
