= Christianity and Liberalism =

1923 book by J. Gresham Machen

- Title page
- Author: J. Gresham Machen
- Genre: Christian Theology
- Publisher: William B. Eerdmans Publishing Company
- Publication date: 1923

Christianity and Liberalism is a 1923 book by J. Gresham Machen. It was written in response to Harry Emerson Fosdick's 1922 sermon "Shall the Fundamentalists Win?", thus triggering the fundamentalist–modernist controversy.

Machen argued that Liberal Christianity constituted a distinct religion, since it denied substitutionary atonement. However, its true nature was, according to Machen, "hidden by the duplicitous use of traditional terms and categories by liberal clergy." Machen wrote,

The liberal attempt at reconciling Christianity with modern science has really relinquished everything distinctive of Christianity, so that what remains is in essentials only that same indefinite type of religious aspiration which was in the world before Christianity came upon the scene.

Iain H. Murray calls Christianity and Liberalism "one of the most important books of all times". Vance Havner was deeply influenced by the book, which caused him to reject his earlier fascination with Fosdick's teaching.
