= Bullinger =

Bullinger is a surname. It most commonly refers to:

- Heinrich Bullinger (1504–1575), Swiss Reformer and theologian

Notable people with the surname include:

- Ethelbert William Bullinger (1837–1913), English clergyman, biblical scholar, and dispensationalist theologian
- Hans-Jörg Bullinger (born 1944), German scientist
- Herbert Bullinger (1918–2004), German cavalry officer
- Jim Bullinger (born 1965), American baseball player
- Johann Balthasar Bullinger (1713–1793), Swiss landscapist, portrayer, engraver and 1773 professor at the newly founded art school «Kunstschule Zürich»
- Kirk Bullinger (born 1969), American baseball player
