= Matthew 5:17 =

- ← 5:16 5:18 →
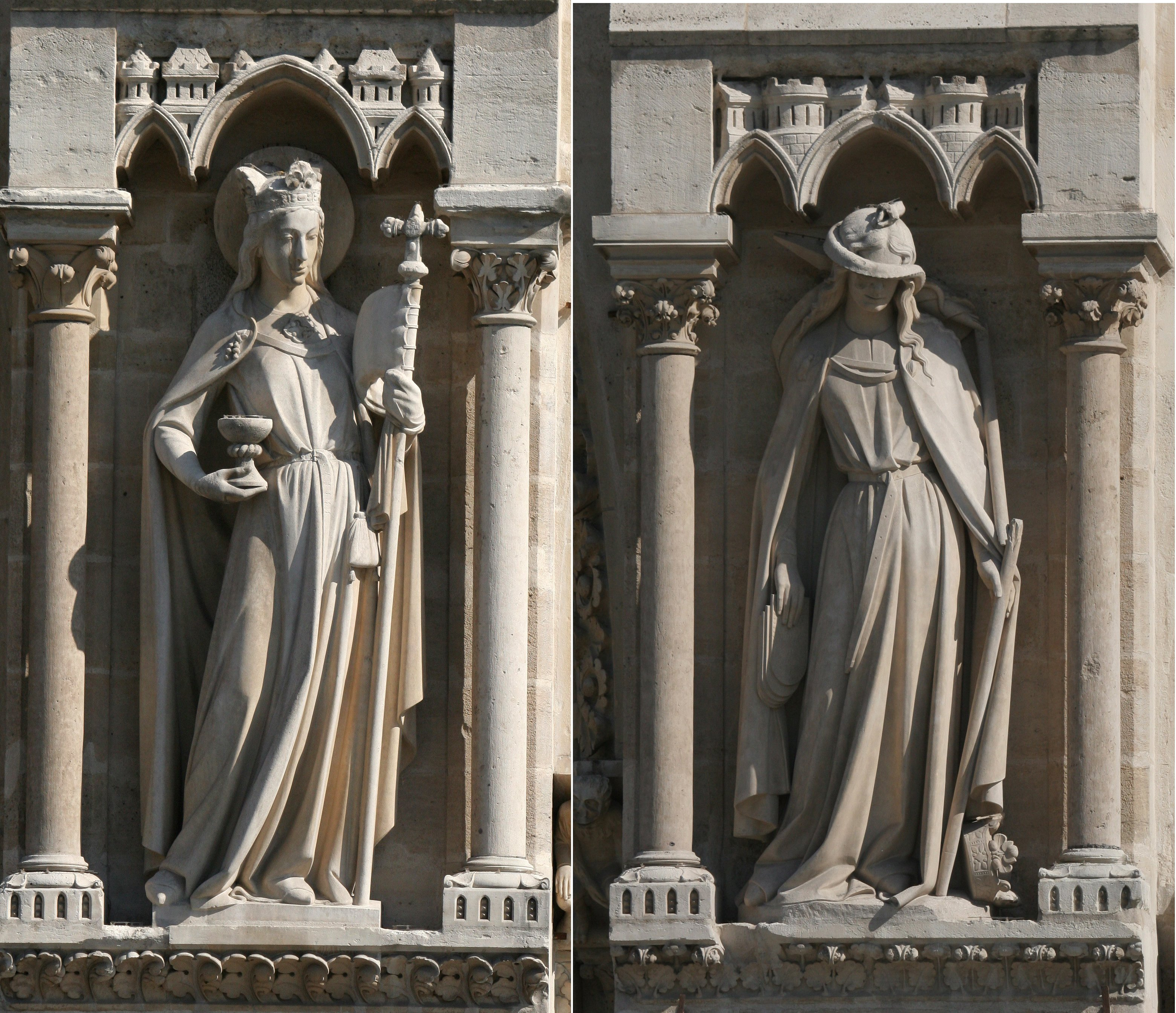
- Ecclesia et Synagoga, a medieval depiction comparing Jewish and Christian law on the façade of Notre Dame Cathedral in Paris.
- Book: Gospel of Matthew
- Christian Bible part: New Testament

Matthew 5:17 is the 17th verse of the fifth chapter of the Gospel of Matthew in the New Testament and is part of the Sermon on the Mount. One of the most debated verses in the gospel, this verse begins a new section on Jesus and the Torah, where Jesus discusses the Law and the Prophets.

== Content ==
The original Koine Greek, according to Westcott and Hort, reads:

μη νομισητε οτι ηλθον καταλυσαι τον νομον η τους
προφητας ουκ ηλθον καταλυσαι αλλα πληρωσαι

In the King James Version of the Bible the text reads:

Think not that I am come to destroy the law, or
the prophets: I am not come to destroy, but to fulfil.

The World English Bible translates the passage as:

"Don't think that I came to destroy the law or the
prophets. I didn’t come to destroy, but to fulfill."

For a collection of other versions see BibleGateway Matthew 5:17.

== Jesus and Mosaic law ==
This verse is central to the debate over the relationship between the New Testament and the Old Testament first begun by Marcion of Sinope. There are several parts of the New Testament where Jesus can be read as rejecting some tenets of Mosaic law. Issues include the traditional understanding of the Sabbath in Matthew 12:8, divorce laws in Matthew 5:31, and dietary prohibitions in Matthew 15:11.

The antinomian viewpoint holds that, because Jesus accomplished all that was required by the law, thus fulfilling it, he made it unnecessary for anyone to do anything further. Proponents of this view believe this view was described by the Apostles in Acts of the Apostles, and that the Jewish Christians overlooked such teaching as they continued to worship in Herod's Temple as prescribed by the Mosaic Law, even after the resurrection. According to this view, anyone accepting his gift of salvation would not only avoid consequences of failing to live up to the law, but is no longer expected to do any works of the law for any spiritual reason (See also Hyperdispensationalism).

The opposite of antinomianism is the idea that the entire Torah Law is still entirely applicable to Christians - not for salvation, but rather for simple obedience. This interpretation stems primarily from the New Testament affirmation that Jesus Christ was sinless in every way (Hebrews 4:15), sin is defined by the Torah (1 John 3:4), and that Jesus' followers, both Jew and Gentile, are admonished to imitate Jesus in every way (1 John 2:6). This view affirms the six points of St. Augustine listed below, but differs from other traditional views by affirming obedience to specific commands of the Law such as dietary laws; laws to which other views teach obedience is no longer intended by God. Proponents of this view see Matthew 23:1–3 and 23:23 as evidence that Jesus did not negate any aspects of the Biblical Torah Law for his followers. Furthermore, they see it as a contradiction of Jesus' sinlessness (according to His own words, Matthew 5:19) for Him to have taught disobedience to any Torah command, no matter how small. For references for this view, see Christian views on the old covenant.

=== Early Christians ===
This issue was a central one to the Jewish Christians, that the author of Matthew is widely believed to have been a part of, as the Jewish Christians would have accused the Pauline Christians of abandoning Jewish doctrine, for example the Council of Jerusalem and Acts of the Apostles 21:21:

"They have been told about you that you teach all the Jews living among the Gentiles to forsake Moses, and that you tell them not to circumcise their children or observe the customs." NRSV

Some scholars also believe that antinomianism, the belief that all was allowed because there were no laws, was believed by a faction in the early Christian community. In this verse the Gospel of Matthew directly counters these views by insisting the old laws such as the Ten Commandments are still valid. France notes that "law and prophets" was a common expression for the entirety of what Christians today call the Old Testament, though it more correctly refers to the Mosaic Law and Neviim, see Biblical Canon.

The main controversy over this verse is over the word "fulfill." What exactly does fulfilling the laws entail? A wide number of reading of the word pleroo, fulfil, have been advanced. Among them are: establish, confirm, validate, complete, bring into actuality by doing, set forth in their true meaning, accomplish, and obey. These varying definitions and the textual uncertainty over the status of the law have led to a number of understandings of the relationship between Mosaic law and the New Testament.

In the early church there were a number of factions that felt the coming of Jesus had brought about a rejection of the Old Testament, these included the followers of Simon Magus, Marcionism, Gnosticism, Montanism, Manichaeism, and others. The Ante-Nicene Fathers in the early church rejected these views and spent considerable time rebutting them. For example, Irenaeus rejected Marcion and praised the Apostles in his Against Heresies 3.12.12:

"...being brought over to the doctrine of Simon Magus, they have apostatized in their opinions from Him who is God, and imagined that they have themselves discovered more than the apostles, by finding out another god; and [maintained] that the apostles preached the Gospel still somewhat under the influence of Jewish opinions, but that they themselves are purer [in doctrine], and more intelligent, than the apostles."

=== St Augustine ===
Another important writer who rejected any break between Jesus and Moses was St. Augustine who outlines his view in his Reply to Faustus, a Manichaeist. Augustine outlined six different ways in which Jesus fulfilled the law:

- Jesus personally obeyed the law
- He fulfilled the messianic predictions
- He empowered his people to obey it
- He brought out its true meaning
- He explained the true meaning behind the rituals and ceremonies
- He gave additional commands that furthered the intentions of the Law.

=== Other writers ===
The most important of these arguments was the sixth, that Jesus expanded the law but did not replace it. A number of others used analogy to explain this notion. Chrysostom used the analogy of a race saying that Jesus had added extra distance for the Christians to run, but the beginning remained the same. Theophylact of Bulgaria used the image of an artist colouring in an outline, and St. Thomas Aquinas saw it as how a tree still contains the seed. This view became the accepted Roman Catholic position, but was challenged in the Protestant Reformation. Leading Protestants such as Martin Luther, John Calvin, and Huldrych Zwingli rejected the idea Jesus had added to the Law. Rather they argued that Jesus only illustrated the true Law that had always existed, but had been badly understood by the Pharisees and other Jewish leaders. The Anabaptists took the opposite view and felt the Jesus had greatly reformed the Law and felt that Old Testament precepts could only be justified if they had been reaffirmed by Jesus.

E. P. Sanders in Jesus and Judaism, published in 1985, argued that Jesus was a Pharisee, as he could find no substantial points of opposition. He maintained that Jesus himself did not transgress any part of the Mosaic law, did not oppose or reject the law, and that the disciples continued to keep it, as is shown by their continued worship in Herod's Temple (e.g. Acts 3:1; 21:23–26). Sanders also argued that Jesus' sayings did not entirely determine early Christian behaviour and attitude, as is shown by Paul's discussion of divorce (1 Corinthians 7:10–16), where he quotes Jesus' sayings ("not I but the Lord") and then gives his own independent ("I and not the Lord") rules. (See also Great Apostasy, Cafeteria Christianity).

== Commentary from the Church Fathers ==
Glossa Ordinaria: Having now exhorted His hearers to undergo all things for righteousness’ sake, and also not to hide what they should receive, but to learn more for others’ sake, that they may teach others, He now goes on to tell them what they should teach, as though He had been asked, ‘What is this which you would not have hid, and for which you would have all things endured? Are you about to speak any thing beyond what is written in the Law and the Prophets;’ hence it is He says, Think not that I am come to subvert the Law or the Prophets.

Pseudo-Chrysostom: And that for two reasons. First, that by these words He might admonish His disciples, that as He fulfilled the Law, so they should strive to fulfil it. Secondly, because the Jews would falsely accuse them as subverting the Law, therefore he answers the calumny beforehand, but in such a manner as that He should not be thought to come simply to preach the Law as the Prophets had done.

Saint Remigius: He here asserts two things; He denies that He was come to subvert the Law, and affirms that He was come to fulfil it.

Augustine: In this last sentence again there is a double sense; to fulfil the Law, either by adding something which it had not, or by doing what it commands.

Chrysostom: Christ then fulfilled the Prophets by accomplishing what was therein foretold concerning Himself—and the Law, first, by transgressing none of its precepts; secondly, by justifying by faith, which the Law could not do by the letter.

Augustine: And lastly, because even for them who were under grace, it was hard in this mortal life to fulfil that of the Law, Thou shalt not lust, He being made a Priest by the sacrifice of His flesh, obtained for us this indulgence, even in this fulfilling the Law, that where through our infirmity we could not, we should be strengthened through His perfection, of whom as our head we all are members. For so I think must be taken these words, to fulfil the Law, by adding to it, that is, such things as either contribute to the explanation of the old glosses, or to enable to keep them. For the Lord has showed us that even a wicked motion of the thoughts to the wrong of a brother is to be accounted a kind of murder. The Lord also teaches us, that it is better to keep near to the truth without swearing, than with a true oath to come near to blasphemy.

Preceded by Matthew 5:16	Gospel of Matthew; Chapter 5	Succeeded by Matthew 5:18
