= Hyperdispensationalism =

Conservative Protestant evangelical movement

Hyperdispensationalism, also referred to as Mid-Acts Dispensationalism, is a Protestant conservative evangelical movement that values biblical inerrancy and a literal hermeneutic. It holds that there was a Church during the period of the Acts that is not the Church today, and that today's Church began when the book of Acts was closed.

Some advocates of hyperdispensationalism refer to themselves as members of the Grace Movement and they reject the prefix "hyper" as pejorative or misinforming. Many affiliate with the Grace Gospel Fellowship, a church association, and its Grace Christian University or the more conservative Berean Bible Society.

Opponents of hyperdispensationalism are classic dispensationalists such as Scofield and Chafer, revised dispensationalists like John Walvoord and Charles Ryrie, ultradispensationalists, and progressive dispensationalists.

== General views ==
Hyperdispensationalists are not monolithic nor homogenous. There are two main positions: Acts 9 and Acts 13. Both see the dispensation of Grace, which is the church age, as beginning with the Apostle Paul. Also, within the movement is found King James only elements associated mainly with the teachings of Richard Jordan and Grace School of the Bible. While the Acts 2 position differs from other forms of dispensationalism, they are all true dispensationalists and fully evangelical still tending towards fundamentalism. Furthermore, the differences separating the Mid-Acts position from the Acts 28 position are just as great as those separating the Acts 2 position from the Mid-Acts dispensational position.

=== Water baptism ===
Hyperdispensationalists reject water baptism (along with charismatic gifts, prophets, and apostles), which divides them from mainstream dispensationalists, who are often Baptists, like W. A. Criswell, or in earlier times Presbyterians like James H. Brookes. Instead, they believe in baptism made without hands and without water, by the Spirit, which occurs when one believes in Christ as their Savior whereby one is identified with Christ's death, burial, and resurrection. While hyperdispensationalists reject water baptism like ultradispensationalists, they still practice the Lord's Supper as a memorial and not as an ordinance, whereas ultradispensationalists reject both the Lord's Supper and water baptism.

=== Testamental continuity ===
Hyperdispensationalists follow absolute discontinuity between testaments, believing that none of the Old Testament applies or is binding on Christians today who are instead governed by the Law of Christ.

== Divisions ==
Early ultradispensationalism (Acts 28 dispensationalism), like that promoted by E. W. Bullinger, emphasized a dispensational boundary in Acts 28:28, but did not apply this boundary line to the Pauline epistles. Unlike Bullinger, Robert Anderson posited a Pentecostal dispensation during the period covered by the Book of Acts. Bullinger considered the Pauline epistles as a whole, whether or not they were written before or after Acts 28:28, in almost all of his writings. Bullinger thus did not apply his Acts 28 position consistently to his exposition of Paul's epistles until later in life and then only in one book. Thus, most of his books that had already been published, along with the writings of Robert Anderson, view Paul's epistles monolithically and are then quite compatible with Mid-Acts hyperdispensationalism.

The Mid-Acts position and the Acts 28 position differ mainly on when the normative portion of Paul's ministry to the church began. Both hyperdispensationalism and ultradispensationalism see the Gospel accounts as for Israel in the Mosaic dispensation. Mid-Acts types take all of Paul's epistles to be directly written to the church, thus accepting the practice of the Lord's Supper as for that dispensation of grace, but the Acts 28 position takes only Paul's prison epistles (those written while in prison after Acts 28) to be directly applicable to the church today, thus denying the Lord's Supper for today. There is only one baptism made without hands, in which the believer is baptized into Christ by the Holy Spirit (1 Corinthians 12:13), which is held in contradistinction to Christ baptizing believing Israel in Acts 2 with the Holy Spirit. The pouring-out baptism of the Holy Spirit is in fulfillment of the Old Testament promise of the New Covenant to Israel. Thus, it has nothing to do with the newly-revealed mystery to and through the apostle Paul, who is not sent out until years later with the new ministry to the gentiles to establish a new church which is composed of both believing Israelites and believing gentiles, not just Israelites (which includes proselytes to Judaism), as in Acts 2.

Paul, it is specifically noted, was sent to preach the gospel but not to baptize, unlike notably the Lord's commission to his apostles. The new church is not obligated to any Jewish rituals (like water baptism), according to the determination of the Council of Jerusalem recorded in Acts 15.

Bullinger held that Paul's authoritative teaching began after the conclusion of the Book of Acts, a viewpoint that is now characterized as Acts 28 ultradispensationalism (chapter 28 being the concluding chapter of the book). The position was first suggested by J.B. Cole and later solidified by Charles H. Welch.

The Mid-Acts position was developed independently in America later by J.C. O'Hair and followed later by Cornelius R. Stam and Charles F. Baker, among others, and reflects their position that Paul's normative ministry began with Paul's ministry with his salvation in Acts 9 (Stam) or with Paul's commission in Acts 13 (O'Hair, Baker). A very few independent spirits have staked the beginning of the church in a few other chapters, but such differences are technical preferences rather than disagreements. The hallmark is that the church is served uniquely with Paul's ministry, and upon that there is a complete agreement.

Acts is seen as a transitional period between dispensations, and the Mid-Acts position does not insert an extra dispensation there (contra Ryrie), as did Anderson.

John Nelson Darby, the father of dispensationalism, believes that the church began at Pentecost, but his dispensational scheme is not like Scofield's and later American dispensationalists (except classic Pauline dispensationalism). It is also unlike that of hyperdispensationalists. The church does not begin with a new dispensation for Darby, as the administrations upon Earth are not relevant for the heavenly church body. One can study R.A. Huebner, who sees the Church's advent at Acts 2, to get a better understanding of Darby's scheme of dispensations, which is different than Scofield's. Also, Miles J. Stanford (classic Pauline dispensationalism) follows Darby's dispensational scheme and criticizes Acts 28 as well as Mid-Acts dispensationalists for not following Darby. Stanford drew heavily upon Darby's soteriology of "spiritual growth" and considered himself a "classic Pauline dispensationalist" in the line of the Plymouth Brethren Darbyite dispensationalists.

However, classic (Pauline) dispensationalism's earliest teachers (Darbyite) were the source for J.C. O'Hair's consistent dispensational doctrines, but he seems to have adopted Scofield's dispensational scheme, adapting it to the Mid-Acts position. Also, early Calvinism does not seem to be in evidence so much today and is being fully rejected in more and more churches.

If Darby appears to be followed more closely by hyperdispensationalism, Darby's dispensationalism and hyperdispensationalism are more consistent than American Acts 2 dispensationalism in marking Scripture's distinction between national Israel, with its earthly kingdom, from the Church, which is Christ's heavenly body. Here too, hyperdispensationalism and ultradispensationalism may be seen to make more than a mere distinction between Israel and the Church, but classic (Pauline) dispensationalism (Acts 2) is as extreme, if not more so, in making rather a separation between Israel and the Church.

"if Christianity were the new covenant, which it is not, the Holy Ghost is the seal of faith now as circumcision was then. Matthew 28 was never carried out. The mission to the Gentiles was given up to Paul explicitly (Gal. 2) who was not sent to baptize...."

"the outward symbol and instrument of unity is the partaking of the Lord's supper - for we being many are one 'bread, one body, for we are all partakers of that one bread.' And what does Paul declare to be the true intent and testimony of that rite? That whensoever 'ye eat this bread and drink this cup, ye do shew the Lord's death till he come.' Here then are found the character and life of the church"

O'Hair followed more closely to the early American dispensationalists and abandoned denominational loyalties. Rejecting gifts for the Church age led to a rejection of water baptism and the Acts 2 position. He then began to explore Acts 28 as an alternative but eventually rejected that as well. It was then that H.A. Ironside wrote "Wrongly Dividing the Word of Truth," confusing O'Hair with Bullinger's teachings. Later, O'Hair settled upon the Mid-Acts position.

== Most notable proponents ==
The most notable proponents of the Mid-Acts view were J.C. O'Hair, Charles Baker, and C.R. Stam. The Mid-Acts dispensational viewpoint is also shared on many current television programs, including "Forgotten Truths" with Richard Jordan, "Through the Bible" with Les Feldick, and "Transformed by Grace" with Kevin Sadler.

== See also ==
- Pauline Christianity

== Sources ==
- Baker, Charles F., A Dispensational Theology, 1971, Grace Bible College Publications, Grand Rapids, Michigan.
- Stam, Cornelius R., Things That Differ, 1951, Berean Bible Society, Germantown, Wisconsin.
