= Pauline Christianity =

Christianity based on Apostle Paul's doctrines

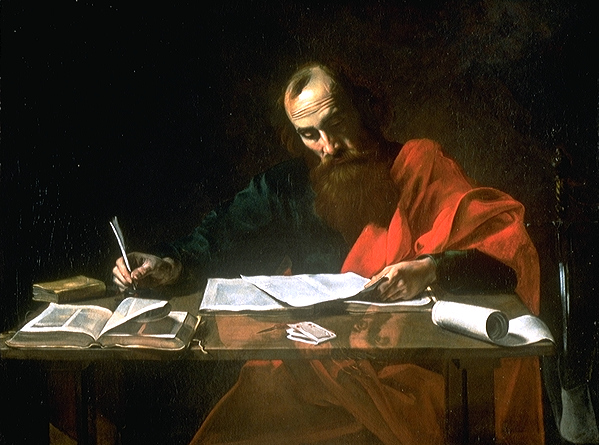
Artist depiction of Saint Paul Writing His Epistles, 16th century (Blaffer Foundation Collection, Houston, Texas). Most scholars think Paul actually dictated his letters to a secretary.

Pauline Christianity or Pauline theology (also Paulism, Paulianity or Paulanity), otherwise referred to as Gentile Christianity, is the theology and form of Christianity which developed from the beliefs and doctrines espoused by the Hellenistic-Jewish Apostle Paul through his writings and those New Testament writings traditionally attributed to him. Paul's beliefs had some overlap with Jewish Christianity, but they deviated from this Jewish Christianity in their emphasis on inclusion of the Gentiles into God's New Covenant and in his rejection of circumcision as an unnecessary token of upholding the Mosaic Law.

Proto-orthodox Christianity, which is rooted in the first centuries of the history of Christianity, relies heavily on Pauline theology and beliefs and considers them to be amplifications and explanations of the teachings of Jesus. Since the 18th century, a number of scholars have proposed that Paul's writings contain teachings that are different from the original teachings of Jesus and those of the earliest Jewish Christians, as documented in the canonical gospels, early Acts, and the rest of the New Testament, such as the Epistle of James, though there has been increasing acceptance of Paul as a fundamentally Jewish figure in line with the original disciples in Jerusalem over past misinterpretations, manifested through movements like "Paul Within Judaism".

Other schools of thought in the ante-Nicene period were Marcionite Christianity and Gnosticism, which were both influenced by the writings of Paul.

== Definition and etymology ==
=== Definition ===
Pauline Christianity or Pauline theology, also called "Paulism" or "Paulanity", is the theology and Christianity which developed from the beliefs and doctrines espoused by Paul the Apostle through his writings. Paul's beliefs were strongly rooted in the earliest Jewish Christianity, but they deviated from this Jewish Christianity in their emphasis on inclusion of the Gentiles into God's New Covenant and in his rejection of circumcision as an unnecessary token of upholding the Law.

=== Etymology ===
According to Hans Lietzmann, the term "Pauline Christianity" first came into use in the 20th century among scholars who proposed different strands of thought within Early Christianity, wherein Paul was a powerful influence.

Marxist writer Antonio Gramsci (1891–1937), who stressed the similarities between Primitive Christianity and Marxism, used the phrase 'Christo-Paulinism' not only to indicate Paul's greater importance but also to distinguish between theological and ideological beliefs and the organization of the institutional Church.

The expression is also used by modern Christian scholars, such as John Ziesler and Christopher Mount, whose interest is in the recovery of Christian origins, and the importance of Paul for paleo-orthodoxy, Christian reconstructionism and restorationism.

== Paul and the inclusion of Gentiles ==
The first Christians were Jews. According to Paul and the author of the Acts of the Apostles, he initially persecuted those early Christians, but then converted, and, years later, was called to proselytise among Gentiles.

=== Inclusion of Gentiles ===
An early creed about Jesus' death and resurrection which Paul probably used was 1 Corinthians 15, verses 3–5 (plus possible additional verses). Probably originating from the Jerusalem apostolic community, the antiquity of the creed has been noted by many biblical scholars:

For I delivered to you as of first importance what I also received, that Christ died for our sins according to the Scriptures, and that He was buried, and that He was raised on the third day according to the Scriptures, and that He appeared to Cephas, then to the twelve,...

There has been widespread acknowledgement of the view of W. D. Davies that the essential Jewishness of Paul's Christian perspective has been underplayed. In Davies' view, Paul replaced the Torah, the Jewish law or Law of Moses, with Christ.

In the view of Daniel Boyarin, Paula Fredriksen and other notable NT scholars cited by them, writing with lived experience of the Jewish context, Paul did not replace Torah or Halakha with Christ for Jewish believers, but simply taught gentiles that observing the Noahide Laws as righteous among the nations was sufficient (along with faith in Christ), to merit a share in the world to come. This was a view shared by the Pharisees and taught in the Talmud and Maimonides (with the exception of the element of faith in Christ), but denied by (mostly gentile born) Judaizers who taught conversion to Judaism as a requisite for salvation. For example, his epistle to the Romans 13 teaches the obligations of a righteous gentile under the Noachide covenant, with Romans 14-15 expansive commentary on dietary ethics.

According to Christopher Rowland, "the problems with which he wrestles in his letters were probably typical of many which were facing the Christian sect during this period".

According to Krister Stendahl, the main concern of Paul's writings on Jesus' role, and salvation by faith, is the problem of the inclusion of gentile (Greek) Torah observers into God's covenant. (Note: Stephen Westerholm (2015), The New Perspective on Paul in Review, Direction, Spring 2015 · Vol. 44 No. 1 · pp. 4–15) The inclusion of Gentiles into early Christianity posed a problem for the Jewish identity of the early Christians. Many of the Jewish Christians were fully faithful religious Jews, only differing in their acceptance of Jesus as the Messiah. Observance of the Jewish commands, including circumcision, was regarded as a token of the membership of this covenant, and the early Jewish Christians insisted on keeping those observances. The new converts did not follow all "Jewish Law" and refused to be circumcised, as circumcision was considered repulsive during the period of Hellenization of the Eastern Mediterranean.

Paul objected strongly to the insistence on keeping all of the Jewish commandments, considering it a great threat to his doctrine of salvation through faith in Jesus. For Paul, Jesus' death and resurrection solved this problem of the exclusion of the gentiles from God's covenant. 'Dying for our sins' refers to the problem of gentile Torah-observers, who, despite their faithfulness, cannot fully observe commandments, including circumcision, and are therefore 'sinners', excluded from God's covenant. Jesus' death and resurrection solved this problem of the exclusion of the gentiles from God's covenant, as indicated by Rom 3:21-26.

Paul insists that salvation is received by the grace of God; according to Sanders, this insistence is in line with Judaism of c. 200 BCE until 200 CE, which saw God's covenant with Israel as an act of grace of God. Observance of the Law is needed to maintain the covenant, but the covenant is not earned by observing the Law, but by the grace of God. (Note: Jordan Cooper, E.P. Sanders and the New Perspective on Paul)

=== Split with Jewish Christianity ===
There was a slowly growing schism between Christians and Jews, rather than a sudden split. Even though it is commonly thought that Paul established a Gentile church, it took centuries for a complete break to manifest.

Irenaeus, bishop of Lyon, wrote in the latter half of the 2nd century that the Ebionites rejected Paul as an apostate from the law, using only a version of the Gospel according to St. Matthew, known as the Gospel of the Ebionites.

== Influence ==
Paul had a strong influence on early Christianity, transmuting Jesus the Jewish messiah into the universal (Note: In a wider meaning "catholic") savior. This thesis is founded on differences between the views of Paul and the earliest Jewish Christianity, and also between the picture of Paul in the Acts of the Apostles and his own writings. In this view, Paul is to be taken as pro-Hellenization or Romanization.

=== Scholarly views ===
There are considerable differences of scholarly opinion concerning how far Paul did in fact influence Christian doctrine. (Note: Among the most radical is G. A. Wells, a professor of German rather than of theology or history, whose view is that Jesus was a mythical figure and that Christianity was in good part invented by Paul.)

According to the 19th-century German theologian and Hegelian philosopher Ferdinand Christian Baur, founder of the Tübingen school whose view was widely influential, Paul was utterly opposed to the disciples, based upon his view that Acts was late and unreliable and who contended that Catholic Christianity was a synthesis of the views of Paul and the Judaizing church in Jerusalem. Since Adolf von Harnack, the Tübingen position has been generally abandoned.

Ultradispensationalists such as E. W. Bullinger viewed the distinction abhorred by the Ebionites as positive and essential doctrine.

Pauline Christianity was essentially based on Rome and made use of the administrative skills which Rome had honed. Its system of organization with a single bishop for each town was, in Bart Ehrman's view, the means by which it obtained its hegemony.

Michael Goulder wrote widely on a theory of Christian origins that sees a fundamental opposition between Paul the Apostle on one side and the Jerusalem Christians Peter and James, Jesus' brother, on the other. This has been seen as reviving Baur's hypothesis.

=== Distortion ===
Some literary critics of Christianity argue that Paul distorted the original and true doctrine, or claim that Christianity is largely his invention. The former include such secular commentators as the philosophers Friedrich Nietzsche and Bertrand Russell. Nietzsche's criticisms are based upon his moral objections to Paul's thought. Other writers, such as Slavoj Žižek and Alain Badiou, also agree with this interpretation, but hold much more positive opinions about Paul's theological influence.

Christian anarchists, such as Leo Tolstoy and Ammon Hennacy, believe Paul distorted Jesus' teachings. Tolstoy claims Paul was instrumental in the church's "deviation" from Jesus' teaching and practices, while Hennacy believed "Paul spoiled the message of Christ."

== Criticism of the "Pauline Christianity" thesis ==
Christians themselves disagree as to how far there was tension between Paul and the Jerusalem Church. Roman Catholics, Eastern and Oriental Orthodox, Assyrian Church of the East, and conservative Protestants, contend that Paul's writings were a legitimate interpretation of the Gospel. The idea that Paul invented Christianity is disputed by numerous Christian writers.

According to Christopher Rowland, Pauline Christianity is the development of thinking about Jesus in a gentile missionary context. Rowland contends that "the extent of his influence on Christian thought has been overestimated", concluding that Paul did not materially alter Jesus' teachings.

Hurtado notes that Paul regarded his Christological views and the Jerusalem Church's as essentially similar. According to Hurtado, this "work[s] against the claims by some scholars that Pauline Christianity represents a sharp departure from the religiousness of Judean 'Jesus movements'."

== As a pejorative term ==
The pejorative use of the expressions "Pauline Christianity", "Paulism," or "Paulanity," refers to the idea that Paul's supporters, as a distinct group, had an undue influence on the formation of the canon of scripture. It is also sometimes used to refer to the notion that certain bishops, especially the Bishop of Rome, influenced the debates which determined the dogma of early Christianity, thus elevating a Pauline interpretation of the Gospel, to the detriment of other interpretations (including those held by the Gnostics and Marcionites).

== See also ==
- Antinomianism
- Authorship of the Pauline epistles
- Biblical canon
- Christian anarchism
- Development of the Christian biblical canon
- Hyperdispensationalism
- Jesuism
- New Perspective on Paul
- Pauline mysticism
- Pauline privilege
- Paul the Apostle and Judaism
- Proto-orthodox Christianity
- Law of Christ
- Paul and Gnosticism
- Paul the Apostle and women
