= Breton Hymns =

Kantik, or Breton Hymns are popular sacred songs in the Breton language sung at masses and pardons in Lower Brittany.

== General characteristics ==
"The songs are sung communally, in the sense that they have been adopted and sung by the people" and allow the people to express their praise to God in Brittany during religious offerings when the liturgical language of the Catholic church was Latin. Effectively, until the Second Vatican Council (1962-1965), Mass and Vespers were spoken or sung in Latin.

In the abundant discography of traditional Breton carols (In Breton Kantikou), one can cite the albums of fr:Anne Auffret, Yann-Fañch Kemener, Jean Le Meut, choirs like Kanerien Bro Leon, Kanerion Pleuigner, Mouezh Paotred Breizh, Manécanterie Saint-Joseph de Lannion, Psalette de Tréguier or Chœurs de la Maîtrise de Sainte-Anne d’Auray.

The Second Vatican Council having authorised the celebration of Mass and offerings in vernacular language, new Breton carols had been composed since the 1970s, notably by fr:Visant Seité and fr:Roger Abjean (often on the Welsh radio), fr:Job an Irien and fr:Michel Scouarnec. A certain number had been published under the title of Hag e paro an heol by fr:Bleun-Brug then fr:Minihi Levenez. One can also cite more recently the creations of the choir Allah's Kanañ.

Some Breton songs have seen some success outside of Brittany, and have been used to accompany the French lyrics of carols. For example, the carol La nuit qu’il fut livré le Seigneur prit du pain (C3), in which the melody is the same as Lavaromp ar chapeled stouet war an douar, as is also the case in Le pain que tu nous donnes (D83) (Gwerz ar vezventi), O viens, sagesse éternelle (E35) (O êlez ar baradoz), En toi Seigneur mon espérance (G7) (Me ho salud, korf va Zalver), Quand je viens vers toi (G 41) (Karomp Doue da genta), O Croix dressée sur le monde (H 30) (Me a laka va fizians), Jésus qui vit aux cieux (J10) (Kantik ar baradoz), Ami que Dieu appelle (S48) (Patronez dous ar Folgoad), Vous attendiez la promesse (E25) and Bénie sois-tu, sainte Église (K27) (Rouanez ar arvor), Seigneur, seul maître du monde (B24) (Kinnigom oll ar zakrifis), Seigneur que ta parole (A51) (inspiré de Pe trouz war an douar), Vous êtes sans pareille (V10) (la partition indique Air breton). The carol Seigneur, en ton Église (D36) has also taken one of the two melodies from l’angélus Breton de Noël (Eun arhel a-berz an Aotrou), which is also that of Gwerz Zant Erwan.

There have also been recent composition, with melodies modeled on inspiration from Breton songs Dieu qui nous mets au monde (C128) and Si l’espérance t’a fait marcher (G213) by fr:Didier Rimaud and fr:Michel Scouarnec.

One can also note the interest in Breton carols by the composers fr:Camille Saint-Saëns Trois Rapsodies sur des Cantiques bretons for organ (op. 7, 1857); (first and third orchestrated in 1892), fr:Joseph-Guy Ropartz (Kanaouennou ar Bleun-Brug, Douze cantiques bretons), fr:Paul Ladmirault (Quelques vieux cantiques bretons, 1906), and fr:Jean Langlais (Noël breton, Suite armoricaine...).

== History ==
=== 17th century ===
The cultural and religious importance of Breton hymns has been undeniable in Lower Brittany since the middle of the 17th century, due to the influence of the Church. More than in other provinces of France, hymns were a better method used by Catholic pastoralists for catechesis for the then massively rural and illiterate population. The precursor was Michel Le Nobletz (1577-1652) who preached in Morlaix, Landerneau, Le Conquet and especially Douarnenez, illustrating his teaching with tableaux de mission or taolennou depending on hymns. His disciple, Father Julian Maunoir, took up the baton in 1642, publishing a collection of Canticou spirituel "spiritual Kantikoù". "The hymns of Dom Michel and Julien Maunoir, learnt by heart and sung for three hundred years by the Breton people, were their Bible; as they were not Protestants, they had no direct contact with Holy Scripture. However, the hymns themselves comprise well scriptural allusions ". The melodies of the hymns were easy to memorise, as they were sometimes based on well-known French tunes - many of them are simply to the tune of ton anavezet (well-known tune) -. This closeness to secular music initially led to controversy over their validity (Father Julien Maunoir was criticised), as did the quality of the language used (a Breton full of Gallicisms, which was much appreciated at the time, but was not always the case, as Breton militants later nicknamed it "brezoneg beleg" or "Church Breton"), leading to the purification efforts started in the middle of the 19th century by Jean-Guillaume Henry following suite of the Barzaz Breiz de La Villemarqué (This Breton that was "purified" but elitist, and most of all incomprehensible by the people, of a clergy henceforth anxious to get rid of the useless loans in French, would then be named by contrast "brezoneg gador" or "pulpit Breton" for preaching)

== Today ==
Breton hymns were sung in all Breton-speaking dioceses until the French Revolution. Those of Cornouaille, Léon, and Tréguier were entirely Breton-speaking; Vannes' hymns were two-thirds Breton, Saint-Brieuc's in its north-western part (Goëlo), Nantes' in the Guérande peninsula, and Dol's in its parishes surrounded by Breton-speaking areas.

Today, three dioceses have collections of Breton hymns: Quimper, Saint-Brieuc, and Vannes.

- Quimper:

- Breton Hymns, 50 traditional Breton hymns, Morlaix, Liturgical Editions of the Saint-Mathieu Choir, with numerous reprints.

- Breton Hymns of the Diocese of Quimper and Léon. Accompaniment Book, by Joseph Le Marrec, with over 200 harmonized melodies (1943), 7th edition 1996, Morlaix, Liturgical Editions of the Saint-Mathieu Choir.

- Kantikou Brezoneg a-viskoaz hag a-vremañ / Breton Hymns of Always and Today (contains the ordinary of the Mass and 221

Breton hymns with their French translations but without musical notation), Minihi Levenez, 2002.

- Musikou Kantikou Brezoneg a-viskoaz hag a-vremañ. Collection of scores of Breton hymns of always and today, Minihi Levenez, 2011.

- Saint-Brieuc:

- Kantigou Brezonek Eskopti Sant-Brieg ha Landreger gant an toniou war gan, Saint-Brieuc, Prud'homme edition, 1934.

- Kantikou Brezhonek, Kergrist-Moëlou, An Tour-Tan editions, 1983.

- Vannes:

- Gloér de Zoué, Sainte-Anne d’Auray, Santéz Anna Gwened association, 1994.

- Gloér de Zoué. Book of Melodies, Sainte-Anne d’Auray, Santéz Anna Gwened association, no date.

- Gloér de Zoué. Book of Melodies. Translation in French, Sainte-Anne d’Auray, Santéz Anna Gwened association, 1998.

These notated collections do not include all the hymns, as some have their own unique melodies that are heard only in a single location and on the day of the pardon, and are therefore found on loose sheets.
