= Matthew 5:18 =

- ← 5:17 5:19 →
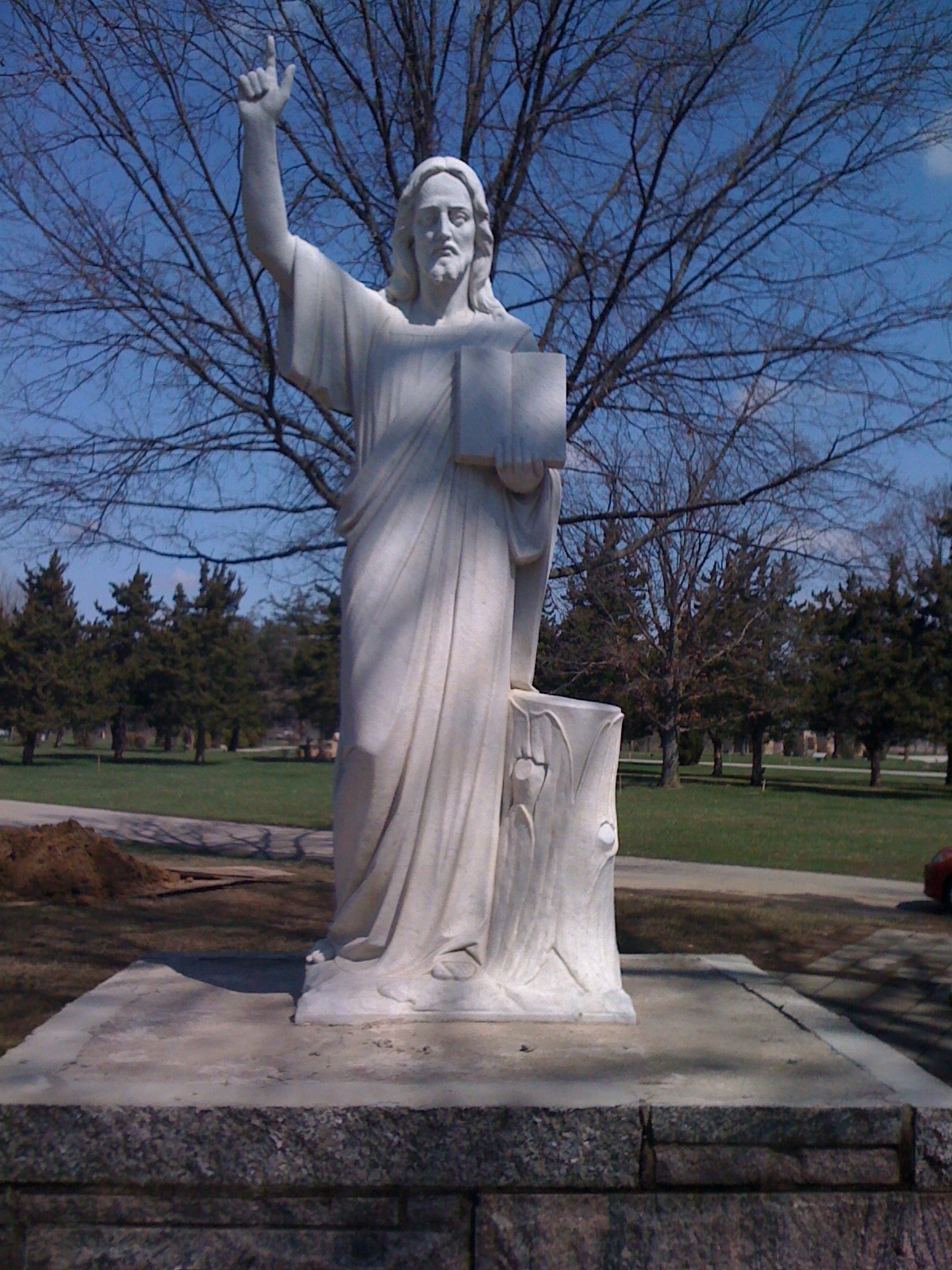
- The Sermon on the Mount (1960), a statue of Jesus in Oaklawn Memorial Gardens - Washington Park Cemetery Association, Indianapolis, IN, United States.
- Book: Gospel of Matthew
- Christian Bible part: New Testament

Matthew 5:18 is the eighteenth verse of the fifth chapter of the Gospel of Matthew in the New Testament and is part of the Sermon on the Mount. In the previous verse, Jesus has stated that he came not to destroy the law, but fulfill it. In this verse, this claim is reinforced.

== Content ==
In the New International Version of the Bible the text reads:

For verily I say unto you, Till heaven and earth pass, one jot or one tittle shall in no wise pass from the law, till all be fulfilled.

The World English Bible translates the passage as:

For most certainly, I tell you, until heaven and earth pass away, not even one smallest letter or one tiny pen stroke shall in any way pass away from the law, until all things are accomplished.

The Novum Testamentum Graece text is:

ἀμὴν γὰρ λέγω ὑμῖν, ἕως ἂν παρέλθῃ ὁ οὐρανὸς καὶ ἡ γῆ, ἰῶτα ἓν ἢ μία κεραία οὐ μὴ παρέλθῃ ἀπὸ τοῦ νόμου, ἕως ἂν πάντα γένηται.

== Analysis ==
The opening "for truly I say to you", which can also be translated as "amen I say to you", is the first occurrence of one of the author of Matthew's favourite turns of phrase. Eugene Boring notes that it occurs thirty-two more times in the Gospel. Schweizer states that it was a typical statement among Koine Greek speaking Jews, but could also have sometimes been used by Aramaic speakers like Jesus.

This verse is the origin of two common English expressions. In Greek the word translated as jot in the KJV is iota, and "not one iota" is used to refer to something with not even the smallest change. The expression "dotting the Is and crossing the Ts", meaning paying attention to detail or putting the final touches on something, also has its origin in this verse.

Jesus probably would have been speaking about the Aramaic alphabet, see Aramaic of Jesus, and scholars have long tried to guess what would originally have been referred to by this phrase. Iota is the smallest letter of the Greek alphabet, and was often left out by transcribers, however, since only capitals were used at the time the Greek New Testament was written (Ι), it probably represents the Aramaic yodh (י) which is the smallest letter of the Aramaic alphabet, and like iota it was frequently forgotten. Lachs notes that this expression only works with the Aramaic alphabet or square script, and not the Ancient Hebrew alphabet. This is historically consistent as the Aramaic script had largely displaced the ancient one by this period.

The word translated as tittle in the KJV in Greek is keraia, and there is much debate as to what it might have referred to. The word keraia literally translates as horns. One possibility is that it refers to the decorative crowns placed atop some Hebrew letters, this would not work for Jesus, however, as such markings only began to be used in the later part of the first century. Burkitt feels it would have been waw, the second smallest letter. Gundry notes that it could also have referred to the small projections that separate certain letters. It could refer to accents in Greek but more likely hooks on Aramaic letters, (ב) versus (כ), or additional marks such as crowns (as Vulgate apex) found in Jewish Bibles.

The main debate over the interpretation of this verse is just how absolute it is. Schweizer feels that "until heaven and earth pass away" means that the Mosaic Law will only last until the end times, and will be superseded in the messianic age. He argues that the opening "for truly I say to you" is "typical of statements concerning the eschaton". He also believes that this verse is a modification of the clearly eschatological one at Mark 13:31. France disagrees feeling that "until heaven and earth pass away" is simply an idiom for the inconceivable.

"Until all things are accomplished" is also the subject of controversy. It is uncertain what all is referring to and how it will be accomplished. France lists three interpretations: until the end of the world, until all the requirements of the Law are met, until the arrival of the messiah. The three interpretations all imply very different understandings of how absolute Mosaic law is for Christians in the current era (see also antinomianism).

== Commentary from the Church Fathers ==
Pseudo-Chrysostom: But since all things which should befal from the very beginning of the world to the end of it, were in type and figure foreshown in the Law, that God may not be thought to be ignorant of any of those things that take place, He therefore here declares, that heaven and earth should not pass till all things thus foreshown in the Law should have their actual accomplishment.

Saint Remigius: Amen is a Hebrew word, and may be rendered in Latin, 'vere,' 'fidenter,' or 'fiat;' that is, 'truly,' 'faithfully,' or 'so be it.' The Lord uses it either because of the hardness of heart of those who were slow to believe, or to attract more particularly the attention of those that did believe.

Hilary of Poitiers: From the expression here used pass, we may suppose that the constituting elements of heaven and earth shall not be annihilated.

Saint Remigius: But shall abide in their essence, but pass through renewal.

Augustine: By the words, one iota or one point shall not pass from the Law, we must understand only a strong metaphor of completeness, drawn from the letters of writing, iota being the least of the letters, made with one stroke of the pen, and a point being a slight dot at the end of the same letter. The words there show that the Law shall be completed to the very least matter.

Rabanus Maurus: He fitly mentions the Greek iota, and not the Hebrew jod, because the iota stands in Greek for the number ten, and so there is an allusion to the Decalogue of which the Gospel is the point and perfection.

Pseudo-Chrysostom: If even an honourable man blushes to be found in a falsehood, and a wise man lets not fall empty any word he has once spoken, how could it be that the words of heaven should fall to the ground empty? Hence He concludes, Whoso shall break the least of these commandments, &c. And, I suppose, the Lord goes on to reply Himself to the question, Which are the least commandments? Namely, these which I am now about to speak.

Preceded by Matthew 5:17	Gospel of Matthew; Chapter 5	Succeeded by Matthew 5:19
