= Ultradispensationalism =

Minority Christian doctrine also known as "Bullingerism"

Ultradispensationalism, also referred to as Bullingerism, is a minority Christian doctrine regarding the relationship between God, the Christian church and human beings. It is a form of dispensationalism closely associated with E. W. Bullinger. It is distinguished from other forms of dispensationalism by its view that the Church begins at the end of Acts. Its adherents reject all sacraments, including baptism.

== Overview ==
The clearest scholarly references to ultradispensationalism (sometimes known as "Bullingerism") are made by Charles C. Ryrie and Charles F. Baker. Ultradispensationalism is a niche doctrine of Christian belief that believes that the Christian Church began with Paul's statement made to the Jewish leaders at Rome in Acts 28:28: "Be it known therefore unto you, that the salvation of God is sent unto the Gentiles, and that they will hear it".

== Beliefs ==
Ultradispensationalists distinguish themselves with their belief that today's Church is exclusively revealed in Paul's later writings, the prison epistles, containing Paul's presentation of "the mystery ... Which in other ages was not made known unto the sons of men, as it is now revealed unto his holy apostles and prophets" (Eph. 3:3–6). This mystery is identified as the Church, a mystery then unrevealed when he wrote his Acts-period epistles.

By contrast, Acts and Paul's early epistles are deemed to cover the Jewish Church that concluded Israel's prophesied history (Bullinger, 1972, p. 195). One rationale for this view is that Paul's epistles written during the period of Acts only proclaim those things which the prophets and Moses said would come, as Paul stated in Acts 26:22. The Acts-period epistles are 1 & 2 Thessalonians, 1 & 2 Corinthians, Galatians, and Romans. Some add Hebrews to this list, believing it to also be written by Paul.

Ultradispensationalism tends to emphasize personal Bible study, a one-on-one relationship with God, and living a Godly life over religious activities.

Most of the adherents to ultradispensationalism reject all sacraments, including baptism with water.

== Proponents ==
The most notable proponent of ultradispensationalism doctrine was E. W. Bullinger (1837–1913). Other writers holding this position include Charles H. Welch, Oscar M. Baker, and Otis Q. Sellers.

== Early ultradispensationalism ==
Early ultradispensationalism, such as that promoted by Sir Robert Anderson and E. W. Bullinger in his early years, emphasized a dispensational boundary line at Acts 28:28, but did not apply this boundary line to the Epistles of Paul, viewing them as a whole whether or not they were written before or after Acts 28:28. When the young Charles Welch pointed out the inherent contradiction in this to E. W. Bullinger, Bullinger changed his views, and incorporated the dividing line into his teachings on the Epistles of Paul that were written from that point forward and which became universally known as ultradispensationalism. Since the majority of his work was written before this point, however, many of his writings view Paul's Epistles as an unbroken whole. Later adherents of ultradispensationalism writers, such as Stuart Allen, Oscar Baker, and Otis Sellers, all followed the example of Charles Welch and E. W. Bullinger's later work in applying the division to Paul's books as well as the book of Acts in the true spirit of ultradispensationalism.

== Post-Acts dispensationalism ==
There is also a division of ultradispensationalism called "Post-Acts dispensationalism", whereby the adherents do not believe that the church began after the Book of Acts chapter 9 nor do they identify the body of Christ as the mystery of Ephesians 3 and Colossians 1. This central belief disqualifies them from the doctrine of hyperdispensationalism which is almost universally recognised as a post-Acts chapter 9 to Acts chapter 15 system of theology.

Post-Acts dispensationalism holds that only the mystery of Ephesians and Colossians is the grace dispensation, which effectively dispensed with "the law of commandments ... the ordinances that were against us" (Eph. 2:15; Col. 2:14), in order to bring those saved into the body during Paul's Later Acts ministry, with those like the Ephesians and Colossians, into one fellowship, "the one new man ... the fellowship of the mystery." (Eph.2:16;3:9) In this new unified body, all the practices ordained for the Acts church, which was decidedly Jewish/Covenantal, were abolished with the "revelation of the mystery" (Romans 16:25) of Ephesians and Colossians. It is this central belief of a subtle form of Acts 28 doctrine that qualifies Post-Acts dispensationalism as a doctrine to be added into the category of ultradispensationalism.
