= Anne Hooper (Protestant) =

- Born: Anne de Tseclaes; Flemish Region
- Died: 7 December 1555; Frankfurt
- Known for: correspondence
- Spouse: John Hooper

Anne Hooper or Anne de Tscerlas (died 7 December 1555) was a Flemish Protestant activist. She became one of the first wives of an English bishop when her husband became the Anglican Bishop of Gloucester and Worcester. She corresponded with other activists and died of the plague in the same year as her husband, John Hooper became a Protestant martyr.

== Biography ==
Hooper was born in the Flemish Region and she and her sister, not her parents or brother, became Protestants. They had left Antwerp due to discrimination and they had taken refuge in Strasbourg. Anne was living at the house of Jacques Bourgonge when she met John Hooper at the home of John and Anne Hilles. They had similar religious beliefs. John studied at the University of Basel and they married each other in Basel in 1547.

In 1548, her daughter was born and the Swiss reformer Henry Bullinger was there as godparent at her baptism. In 1549, Anne had written to her family in Antwerp. By this time her father had died and her brother took the unopened letter from his mother and burnt it. The same year they returned to England.

Hooper was a correspondent of Henry Bullinger. She, Lady Jane Grey and Anne Hilles were friends of his. Her husband became the reformed Anglican Bishop of Gloucester and Worcester and as a result Anne became one of the first wives of an English bishop.

The Catholic "Bloody Mary" came to the English throne and the Protestants were under threat. Anne went abroad in 1553 leaving her husband behind. He was called to account on 22 January 1555 by the Bishop of Winchester and one of the first demands of Hooper was that he renounced his wife.

Her husband was burnt to death on 9 February 1555 for his beliefs. Anne wrote her last extant letter to Bullinger asking him to publish one of her husbands writings. Hooper and her daughter, Rachel, died in Frankfurt in 1555 of the plague. She had been exiled together with others from Blackfriars in Gloucester. Her son, Daniel, survived her and his guardians were Edward Oldsworth and Valérand Poullain. She left twenty pounds to her son who later lived with Valérand Poullain.
