= Grace Gospel Fellowship =

Christian denomination associated with the Grace Movement

- Classification: Evangelical Protestant
- Orientation: Dispensational
- Polity: Congregational
- Moderator: Bryan Walker
- Headquarters: Grand Rapids, Michigan
- Origin: 1944
- Congregations: 107 (2020)
- Members: 60,000 (1992)
- Official website: ggfusa.org

Grace Gospel Fellowship is a Christian denomination in the United States associated with the Grace Movement. The denomination has its headquarters in Grand Rapids, Michigan.

== History ==
The Church has roots in a conference of pastors in 1943, in Indianapolis, Indiana. Grace Gospel Fellowship was founded in 1944. In 1992 it had an estimated 60,000 members in 128 churches. In 2021, Bryan Walker become the President of the Grace Gospel Fellowship and has adopted the mission statement to be "Healthy Pastors, Healthy Boards & Healthy Churches". As of 2020, 107 churches were listed in the Fellowship's church directory.

== Beliefs ==
It is dispensational and premillennial in its theology, and holds to a congregational church polity.
