= Le Conquet =

Le Conquet Konk-Leon
- Commune
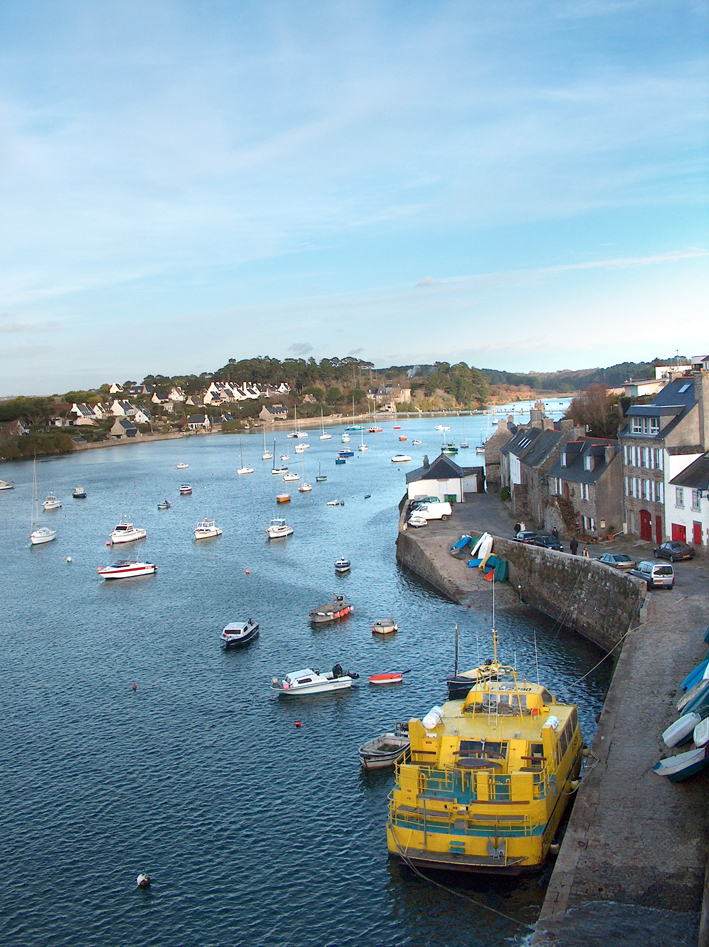
- Port of Le Conquet with bridge

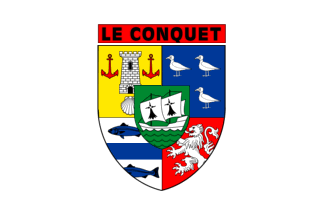
- Flag Coat of arms
- Location of Le Conquet
- Location within France Location within Brittany
- Coordinates: 48°21′31″N 4°46′14″W
- Country: France
- Region: Brittany
- Department: Finistère
- Arrondissement: Brest
- Canton: Saint-Renan
- Intercommunality: Pays d'Iroise

Government
  - Mayor (2020–2026): Jean-Luc Milin
- Area^{1}: 8.45 km^{2} (3.26 sq mi)
- Highest elevation: 51 m (167 ft)
- Lowest elevation: 0 m (0 ft)
- Population (2023): 2,835
  - Density: 336/km^{2} (869/sq mi)
- Time zone: UTC+01:00 (CET)
  - Summer (DST): UTC+02:00 (CEST)
- INSEE/Postal code: 29040 /29217
- Website: leconquet.bzh
- ^{1} French Land Register data, which excludes lakes, ponds, glaciers > 1 km^{2} (0.386 sq mi or 247 acres) and river estuaries.

Le Conquet (French pronunciation: [lə kɔ̃kɛ]; Breton: Konk-Leon) is a commune in the Finistère department of Brittany in northwestern France. This is the westernmost town of mainland France. Only three island towns—Ouessant, Île-Molène and Ile de Sein—are farther west.

== Maritime transport ==
The port of Le Conquet is served by the Penn-ar-Bed ferry company, providing links with Ouessant and the archipelago of Molène throughout the year. From April to September, the Finist'mer company also provides fast links between the port of Le Conquet and Lanildut, and the archipelago of Molene and Ouessant.

== History ==
As he fled from Wales in exile, Henry Tudor landed in Le Conquet rather than France because of a storm that blew his ship off course.

== Population ==
Inhabitants of Le Conquet are called Conquetois in French.

Historical population
Year	Pop.	±% p.a.
1968	1,811	—
1975	1,881	+0.54%
1982	2,011	+0.96%
1990	2,149	+0.83%
1999	2,408	+1.27%
2007	2,573	+0.83%
2012	2,719	+1.11%
2017	2,713	−0.04%
2023	2,835	+0.74%
Source: INSEE

== Sights ==
- The tomb of Jean-François Le Gonidec.
- Chapel dedicated to Michel Le Nobletz

== International relations ==
Le Conquet is twinned with the town of Llandeilo in Wales.

== Economy ==
=== Fishing harbour ===
As an essential crab fishery port, Le Conquet also became ideal for catching uncommon species. The fishing port has been managed by the Chambre de commerce et d'industrie de Brest since 2007. In recent years, alongside traditional crab-fishing ships, the fleet has diversified its activities with other ships, which use fishing nets bringing back monkfish, skate, brill, turbot, lobster, and fresh daily catches. However, the crab remains the symbol of the harbour.

== Rescue station SNSM ==
The rescue station was inaugurated on 10 March 1867. Nowadays, the rescue station uses an SNSM first-class lifeboat of 14 meters in length. She is modern, unsinkable, and self-righting. The SNS 151 La Louve is always anchored in the harbour with two inflatable boats. One of the latter, named Ville du Conquet, is city property and is used for the coastal watch during the summer season.

== Sports and leisure ==
Le Conquet has a dive center named Club Subaquatique.

== Popular culture ==
The town is mentioned in the Asterix series books Asterix and the Chieftain's Daughter and Asterix and the Banquet as Gesocribatum.

== See also ==
- Communes of the Finistère department
