= John Hooper (bishop) =

English Protestant bishop, reformer, and martyr (d. 1555)

The Right Reverend John Hooper
- Bishop of Worcester and Gloucester
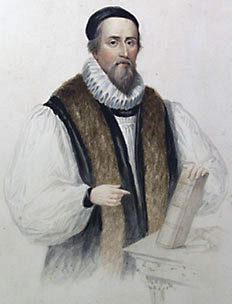
- Church: Church of England
- Diocese: Worcester and Gloucester
- In office: 1552–1554
- Predecessor: Nicholas Heath
- Successor: Nicholas Heath (restored)
- Other post: Bishop of Gloucester (1551–1552)

Orders
- Consecration: 8 March 1551 by Thomas Cranmer

Personal details
- Died: 9 February 1555 Gloucester, Gloucestershire, England
- Denomination: Anglican
- Spouse: Anne de Tscerlas
- Children: 2
- Education: Merton College, Oxford

John Roy Hooper (also Johan Hoper; c. 1495 – 9 February 1555) was an English churchman, Anglican Bishop of Gloucester, later of Worcester and Gloucester, a Protestant reformer and a Protestant martyr. A proponent of the English Reformation, he was executed for heresy by burning during the reign of Queen Mary I.

== Early life ==
Hooper was born in Somerset, educated at Oxford University and then attended a Cistercian monastery in Gloucester.

Prior to 1546, Hooper had secured employment as steward in Sir Thomas Arundell's household. Hooper speaks of himself during this period as being "a courtier and living too much of a court life in the palace of our king". He chanced upon some of Huldrych Zwingli's works and Bullinger's commentaries on St Paul's epistles, which elicited an evangelical conversion. After some correspondence with Bullinger on the lawfulness of complying, against his conscience, with the established religion, and following some trouble in England c. 1539–40, with Stephen Gardiner, bishop of Winchester to whom Arundell had referred him out of concern for his new views, Hooper determined to secure what property he could and take refuge on the continent. He lived in France, Ireland, the Netherlands and Switzerland.

After living in Paris for an unknown period of time, Hooper returned to England to serve Sir John St Loe, constable of Thornbury Castle, Gloucestershire, Arundell's nephew.

In 1538, a John Hooper appears among the names of the Black Friars at Gloucester, and also among the White Friars at Bristol, who surrendered their houses to the king. A John Hooper was likewise canon of Wormesley Priory in Herefordshire; but identification of any of these with the future bishop is doubtful. Rather, he appears to have been in 1538 rector of Liddington, Wiltshire, a benefice in Sir Thomas Arundell's gift, though he must have been a non-resident incumbent. The Greyfriars' Chronicle says that Hooper was "sometime a white monk"; and in the sentence pronounced against him by Stephen Gardiner he is described as "olim monachus de Cliva Ordinis Cisterciensis," i.e. of the Cistercian house of Cleeve Abbey in Somerset. On the other hand, he was not accused, like other married bishops who had been monks or friars, of infidelity to the vow of chastity; and his own letters to Heinrich Bullinger are curiously reticent on this part of his history. He speaks of himself as being the only son and heir of his father and fearing to be deprived of his inheritance, if he adopted the reformed religion.

== Life on the continent ==
Hooper found it necessary to leave for the continent again, probably in 1544, and he reached Strasbourg by 1546. He decided to permanently move to Zürich but he first returned to England to receive his inheritance, and he claims to have been twice imprisoned. In Strasbourg again, in early 1547, he married Anne de Tserclaes (or Tscerlas). She was a Fleming who with her sister had lived in the household of Jacques de Bourgogne, seigneur de Falais. He proceeded by way of Basel to Zürich, where his Zwinglian convictions were confirmed by constant conversation with Zwingli's successor, Heinrich Bullinger. He also made connections with Martin Bucer, Theodore Bibliander, Simon Grynaeus, and Konrad Pellikan. During this time Hooper published several books. His works include An Answer to my Lord of Wynchesters Booke Intytlyd a Detection of the Devyls Sophistry (1547), A Declaration of Christ and his Office (1547), and A Declaration of the Ten Holy Commandments (1548).

== Chaplain at the centre of power ==
It was not until May 1549 that Hooper returned to England. By this time, England had a new king, Edward VI. Hooper became the principal champion of Swiss Calvinism, against the Lutherans as well as the Catholics, and was appointed chaplain to Edward Seymour, 1st Duke of Somerset, the Lord Protector. Hooper had a hand in the formation of the Zwinglian-inspired Dutch and French Stranger churches in Glastonbury and London. Hooper enjoyed at this time a friendship with Jan Łaski. He served as a witness for the prosecution in Bishop Bonner's trial in 1549.

Somerset's fall from power endangered Hooper's position, especially as he had taken a prominent part against Gardiner and Bonner, whose restoration to their sees was now anticipated. However, John Dudley, Earl of Warwick (subsequently Duke of Northumberland), who now dominated the council, continued Somerset's Protestant religious policies. Hooper now became Dudley's chaplain.

== Vestments controversy ==
After a course of Lenten sermons before the king in 1550, he was offered the bishopric of Gloucester. This led to the prolonged vestments controversy; in his sermons before the king and elsewhere Hooper had denounced the "Aaronic vestments" and the oath by the saints, prescribed in the new 1550 ordinal; and he refused to be consecrated according to its rites. Thomas Cranmer, Nicholas Ridley, Martin Bucer and others urged him to submit. Confinement to his house by order of the Council proved equally ineffectual, and it was not until he had spent some weeks in the Fleet prison that the "father of nonconformity" consented to conform, and Hooper submitted to consecration with the legal ceremonies (8 March 1551). Two years later the bishopric of Gloucester was linked with the bishopric of Worcester.

== Bishop ==
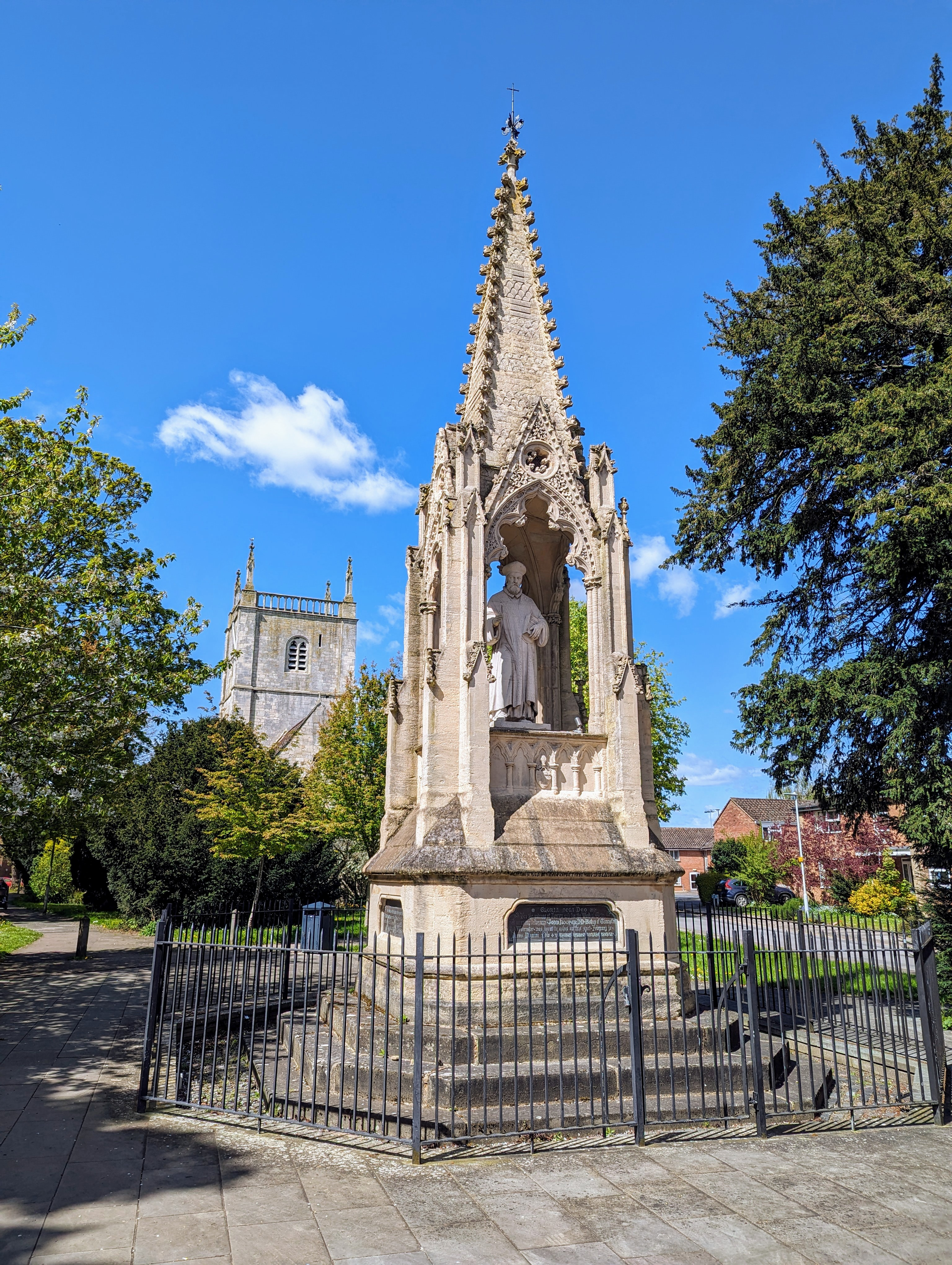
Monument to Bishop Hooper in St. Mary's Square, Gloucester

Though Hooper had a low view of the role of bishops in the church, he soon set about a visitation of his diocese, which revealed a condition of almost incredible ignorance among his clergy. Following examinations of 311 clerics, 168 were not able to repeat the Ten Commandments, and 31 were unable to state in what part of the Scriptures they were to be found; there were 40 who could not tell where the Lord's Prayer was written, and 31 were ignorant of who authored it.

Hooper issued an injunction to his clergy, stressing in Article 9 that they "were to teach the Parishioners the Ten Commandments, the Creed, and the Lord's Prayer...word for word as they be written there...." and in Article 10, "that every parson... teach the Ten Commandments out of the twentieth chapter of Exodus, as they stand there, and no otherwise, not taking one word, letter or syllable from them...". Apparently this standard was enforced through much of the visitation. Less than a year after Hooper had been installed in Gloucester, his Diocese was reduced to an archdeaconry and added to the Diocese of Worcester, of which Hooper was made bishop in succession to Nicholas Heath on 20 May 1552.

Hooper believed a bishop should observe a vow of poverty but resigned the profits of the See of Gloucester to the Crown. As bishop, Hooper was also notable for his sense of social justice, and spoke eloquently of the distress caused by the economic crisis of the early 1550s. He wrote to William Cecil pleading for the council to take action on the price of essential goods, for "all things here be so dear that the most part of the people lack ... their little livings and poor cottages decay daily."

== Downfall and death ==
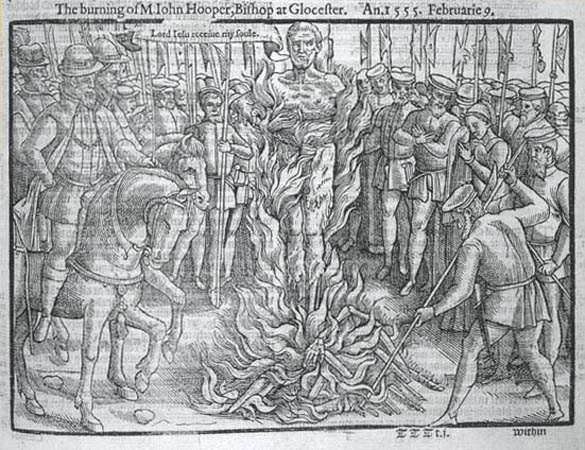
John Hooper's execution as depicted in Foxe's Book of Martyrs.

Upon Edward VI's death in 1553, Northumberland tried to supplant Mary Tudor with his own daughter-in-law, Lady Jane Grey. Hooper opposed this plot but this did not improve his situation once Mary had become Queen. As a representative of the radical wing of Protestantism, Hooper was the first bishop to be arrested. He was given sanctuary at Sutton Court, before being sent to the Fleet Prison on 1 September, first on a charge of debt.

After Edward VI's legislation on the church was repealed, Hooper was deprived of his bishopric as a married man on 19 March 1554. He was kept in prison and, after the revival of the heresy acts in December 1554, he was condemned for heresy by Bishop Gardiner and degraded by Bishop Bonner on 29 January 1555. Hooper was sent to Gloucester, where he was burnt on 9 February. His last words were "Lord Jesus, have mercy on me! Lord Jesus, receive my spirit!"

== Family ==
Hooper was married to Anne de Tscerlas of Antwerp and they had two children, a daughter named Rachel and a son named Daniel.

== Legacy ==
Hooper represented the radical wing of English Protestantism. While he expressed dissatisfaction with some of John Calvin's earlier writings, he approved of the Consensus Tigurinus negotiated in 1549 between the Zwinglians and Calvinists of Switzerland. It was this form of religion that he laboured to spread in England and with others, such as Nicholas Ridley, Martin Bucer, and Pietro Martire Vermigli, he influenced the changes in the 1552 edition of the Book of Common Prayer. The subject had considerable influence on the Puritans of Elizabeth I's reign, when many editions of Hooper's works were published. Two volumes of Hooper's writings are included in the Parker Society's publications and another edition appeared at Oxford in 1855. In 1550 he translated book 2 of Tertullian's "Ad Uxorem" (To his wife), which is the first English translation of any of Tertullian's works.

His feast day is 9 February.

Church of England titles
Preceded by John Wakeman	Bishop of Gloucester; 1550–1552	Succeeded by James Brooks
Preceded by Nicholas Heath as Bishop of Worcester	Bishop of Worcester and Gloucester; 1552–1554	Succeeded by Nicholas Heath (restored) as Bishop of Worcester
