= Heinrich Bullinger =

Swiss Protestant theologian (1504–1575)

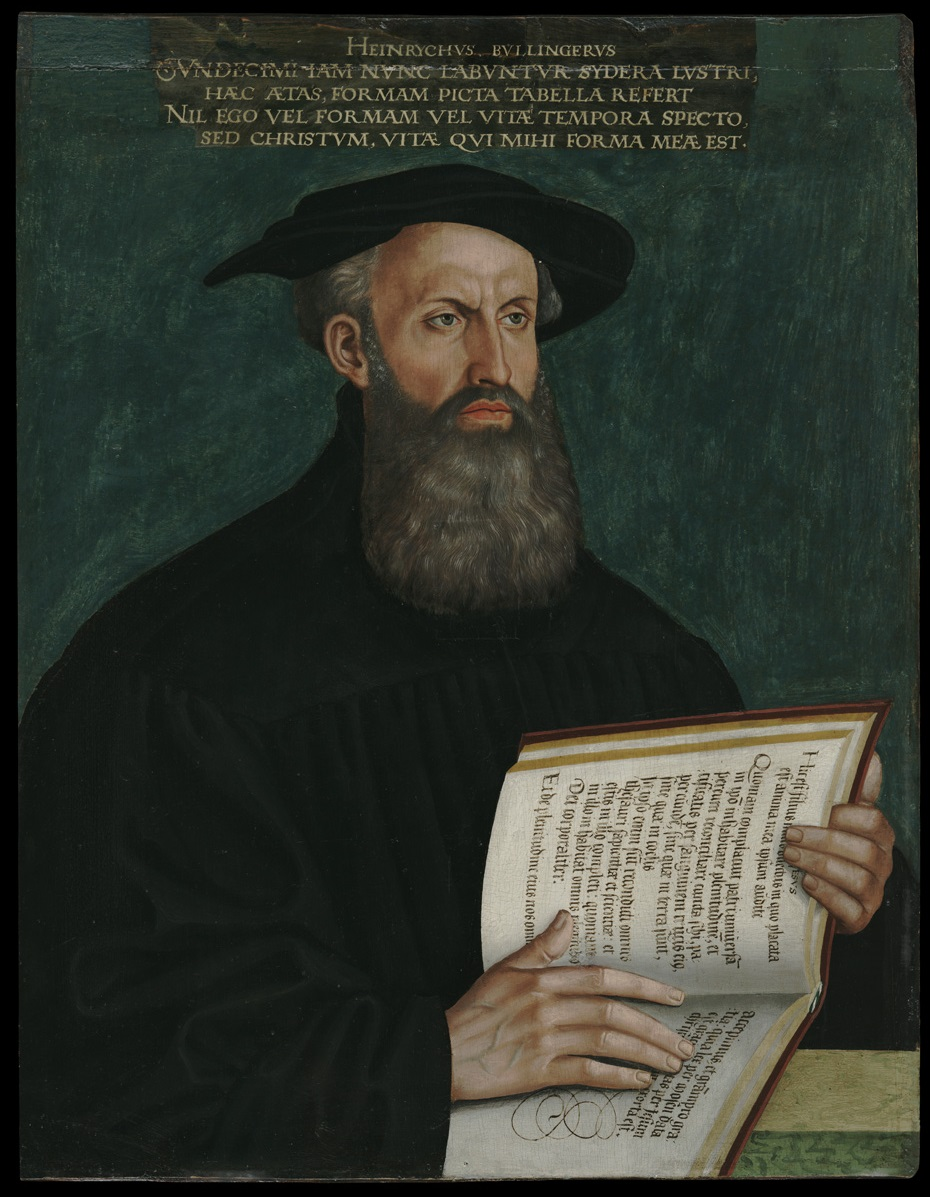
- Portrait by Hans Asper, c. 1550
- Born: 18 July 1504; Bremgarten (Aargau), Canton of Aargau, Old Swiss Confederacy
- Died: 17 September 1575 (aged 71); Zürich, Canton of Zürich, Old Swiss Confederacy
- Occupations: Theologian, antistes
- Spouse: Anna Adlischwyler
- Parent(s): Heinrich Bullinger and Anna Wiederkehr
- Relatives: Johann Balthasar Bullinger and E. W. Bullinger
- Theological work
- Era: Renaissance
- Tradition or movement: Protestantism; Reformed
- Main interests: Systematic theology
- Notable ideas: Covenantalism; Spiritual real presence

Heinrich Bullinger (18 July 1504 – 17 September 1575) was a Swiss Reformer and theologian, the successor of Huldrych Zwingli as head of the Church of Zürich and a pastor at the Grossmünster. One of the most important leaders of the Swiss Reformation, Bullinger co-authored the Helvetic Confessions and collaborated with John Calvin to work out a Reformed doctrine of the Lord's Supper.

== Life ==
=== Early life and studies (1504–1522) ===
Heinrich Bullinger was born to Heinrich Bullinger Sr., a priest, and Anna Wiederkehr, at Bremgarten, Aargau, Switzerland. Heinrich and Anna were able to live as husband and wife, even though not legally married, because the bishop of Constance, who had clerical oversight over Aargau, had unofficially sanctioned clerical concubinage by waiving penalties against the offense in exchange for an annual fee, called a cradle tax. Heinrich was the fifth son and youngest of seven children born to the couple. The family was relatively affluent, and often hosted guests. As a small child, Bullinger survived the plague and a potentially fatal accident.

At age 11, Bullinger was sent to the St. Martin's Latin school in Emmerich in the Duchy of Cleves. (Note: Stephens (2019) says that Bullinger went to the Emmerich Latin School "before his fourth birthday," but he likely means "fourteenth, since Gordon (2004) says that he left at age 14. Ella (2007) puts the specific date of departure at June 11, 1516, which would make Bullinger 11.) Though the family was wealthy by standards of the day, Bullinger's father refused to provide the boy money for food. He encouraged his son to beg for bread for three years, as he had done, and by doing so increase the boy's empathy for the poor. At St. Martin's Latin school, Bullinger studied classic texts, including Jerome, Horace, and Virgil. He was also influenced by the Brethren of the Common Life and their adoption of the Devotio moderna, which emphasized Christian living and the reading of the Bible. Due to this influence, he expressed an interest in becoming a Carthusian monk.

In 1519, at 14, he went to the University of Cologne, where it was supposed he would prepare to follow his father into the clergy. Although there is no evidence that Bullinger was initially aware of Martin Luther's Ninety-five Theses or the Leipzig Disputation of 1519, a year later, he had definitely been exposed to Reformation teaching. He read Peter Lombard's Sentences and the Decretum Gratiani, which led him to the church fathers. Bullinger discovered that the Fathers relied more on Scripture than did Lombard and Gratian, and this discovery encouraged Bullinger to read both the Bible and Luther, including The Babylonian Captivity of the Church and The Freedom of a Christian. He also read works by other Reformers, such as Philip Melanchthon's Loci communes. Now believing that salvation came through God's grace rather than through man's good works, Bullinger was converted to Protestantism. Later in life, he wrote that he had also been encouraged to embrace the Reformation because of the humanist influence of two of his teachers, Johannes Pfrissemius and Arnold von Wesel. Other intellectual influences on Bullinger included the humanism of Erasmus and Rodolphus Agricola, the theology of the church fathers Cyprian, Lactantius, Hilary, Athanasius, Jerome, and Augustine, and the theology of Thomas Aquinas.

In 1522, as a follower of Martin Luther, Bullinger earned his Master of Arts degree but ceased receiving the Eucharist. He also abandoned his previous intention of entering the Carthusian order. When he returned to Bremgarten, his family accepted his new theological views. Though Bullinger was called to lead an abbey in the Black Forest, he found its monks worldly and licentious and so returned home again and spent some months reading history, the church fathers, and Reformation theology.

=== Kappel Abbey and the early Swiss Reformation (1523–1531) ===
==== Kappel Abbey (1523–1528) ====
In 1523, he accepted a post as a teacher at a Cistercian monastery, Kappel Abbey, though only under the condition that he would not take monastic vows nor attend mass. At Kappel Abbey, Bullinger initiated a systematic program of Bible reading and exegesis. He also tried to reform its Trivium curriculum in a more humanist and Protestant direction. Bullinger discovered that the monks barely understood Latin, and so he preached to them in Swiss-German. By 1525, the abbey had abolished mass, and the next year all the monks renounced their vows as they participated in their first Reformed Eucharist.

During this period, during the Reformation in Zürich, Bullinger heard Huldrych Zwingli and Leo Jud preach; and in 1523, he met them. Bullinger became a friend and ally of Zwingli and was present at the Zürich disputation of 1525. Under the influence of Zwingli and the Waldensians, Bullinger moved to a more symbolic understanding of the Eucharist. In 1527, he spent five months in Zürich studying Greek and Hebrew while regularly attending the Prophezei that Zwingli had established there. Zürich authorities sent Bullinger with the city delegation to assist Zwingli at the Bern Disputation, an occasion where he met Martin Bucer, Ambrosius Blaurer, and Berthold Haller. In 1528, at the urging of the Zürich Synod, Bullinger left Kappel Abbey and was ordained as a parish minister in the new Reformed church of Zürich.

Meanwhile, Bullinger wrote theological treatises on the Eucharist, covenants, images, and the relationship of the church to society, important topics he continued to develop in his later writings. He sent these treatises to neighboring cities, attempting to win them to the Reformed position; and these treatises were attacked by Roman Catholics defending papal infallibility and transubstantiation. Bullinger's humanism was also evident in his writings about the church fathers, his belief in the study of liberal arts as preparatory for the study of Scriptures, and even a play he wrote about the classical story of Lucretia.

==== Marriage to Anna Adlischweiler (1529) ====
In the summer of 1527, Bullinger met Anna Adlischweiler, a former nun, in Zurich. (Note: Lawson (2019) suggests that Bullinger met Anna in 1529, when he "traveled to the former Dominican convent at Oetenbach," but Müller (2004) explicitly states that he met Anna "in the summer of 1527," and suggests that he sent the proposal then, and not in 1529 as Lawson suggests.) Contrary to contemporary practice, he sent her a direct proposal of marriage and was betrothed four weeks later. Anna's mother objected because she wanted her daughter to marry a wealthier man and because she wanted Anna to stay by her side until her death. When the engagement became publicly known, she tried to legally break it. Though she failed in this effort, Anna did stay with her mother until her death two years later. Anna then married Bullinger on 17 August 1529. The couple had five daughters and six sons, all of the latter except one becoming Protestant ministers. The couple also adopted other children.

==== Hausen and Bremgarten (1528–31) ====
In June 1528, Bullinger took up a part-time preaching position in Hausen. Shortly thereafter, in February 1529, Bullinger's father renounced Roman Catholicism. Though most of his congregation approved, city officials were wary because of the threat of Roman Catholic protests. Nevertheless, after a few months of debate, those sympathetic to the Reformation prevailed, and Bullinger was chosen to replace his father. Within a week of his first sermon, the images and church altar were removed from the church. Bullinger's father also officially married his mother on 31 December in a Reformed ceremony. In Bremgarten, Bullinger preached four times a week and held a well-attended Bible study every day at 3 in the afternoon.

=== Ministry at Zürich (1531–1575) ===
==== Installed at Zürich (1531) ====
While Zwingli viewed war as an appropriate way of spreading the Reformation, Bullinger did not. When Zwingli called the cantons of Zürich and Bern to war against the Catholic cantons, Bullinger opposed him, even preaching against it. Bullinger argued that religious reform came only through the preaching of the gospel, not through war. Despite a period of peace following the First Kappel War, Zwingli once again sought military victory over the Roman Catholics. His bellicosity led to the Second Kappel War, after Roman Catholics attacked Bremgarten, where Bullinger was ministering. Zwingli's supposed reinforcements turned out to be Roman Catholic and deserted him, and Zwingli was killed. Although the Peace of Kappel allowed each canton to choose its own religion, Bremgarten was excluded from the agreement and re-catholicized. Bullinger and his family lost almost all their possessions and fled to Zürich.

As a leading Protestant preacher, Bullinger was immediately called as pastor by Bern, Basel, and Appenzell. Only three days after fleeing from Bremgarten, Bullinger stood in the pulpit of the Grossmünster. Oswald Myconius said Bullinger so "thundered a sermon from the pulpit that many thought Zwingli was not dead but resurrected like the phoenix". On 9 December, Zürich also officially asked him to be Zwingli's successor as antistes. In part out of loyalty to Zürich, Bullinger chose to succeed Zwingli there. He retained the office until his death in 1575. Bullinger regularly preached 12 sermons a week in the Grossmünster for the first ten years of his ministry until Kaspar Megander was appointed to assume the majority of his preaching duties. Bullinger preached an estimated 28,000 sermons in the Grossmünster pulpit.

==== Zürich church government (1531–32) ====
Bullinger's most important task was to rebuild the Zürich church, even as he continued to defend Zwingli's character and theology. When the Zürich council initially asked Bullinger to be antistes, they listed seven articles as conditions for the position. The fourth article required Bullinger to be peaceful and not interfere in secular affairs. Bullinger agreed that ministers should not take civic roles, but he also stressed that the minister should retain the freedom to preach the Word of God, even if that message varied from the position of civil authorities. Bullinger's rebuilding of the church also included defending it against the Roman Catholics, who were once again poised to invade Zürich. Bullinger persuaded them that he endorsed the Peace of Kappel and did not seek political controversy as Zwingli had done. Finally, in 1532 Bullinger negotiated a compromise peace that guaranteed the freedom of Protestants in exchange for the independence of Roman Catholics in Protestant cantons.

In 1532, Bullinger and Leo Jud engaged in a controversy over church discipline that developed into a debate about the proper relationship between church and state. Jud viewed the church and state as two separate institutions established by God, while Bullinger held a more traditional view. Following Johannes Oecolampadius, Jud proposed exercising church discipline separately from the secular power, while Bullinger argued that separating church and state courts was necessary only if the government were not Christian. In a July sermon, Jud not only sharply criticized Bullinger's view of church discipline, he also accused Bullinger of abandoning the Reformation. Later in the year, a synod settled the debate by siding with Bullinger. The church would be overseen by both a civil council and the ministers of the church, each with its own president. In matters of civil discipline, the council would take precedence over the ministers, but the ministers could disagree with and criticize the council.

Through the arrangements of this synod, Bullinger was able to implement his own synodal order, which became a model for other Reformed churches in German-speaking areas. Bullinger freed the Zürich church from civil authorities by assuming direct personal oversight of the other clergy. He ensured that political and clerical controversies were discussed and resolved behind closed doors; and by carefully informing himself about the 120 parishes under his supervision, he was able to direct their clerical appointments and ordinations. Jud's 1534 Catechism demonstrates that he eventually accepted Bullinger's views on church discipline.

==== Additional responsibilities ====
In addition to his responsibilities as antistes, Bullinger also served as Schulherr, or school principal, charged with organizing Latin schools and theological education in Zürich. He transformed Zwingli's Prophezei into the Lectorium, or Carolinium, to provide theological higher education. Although he helped run the Carolinium, he never held professorship in it, leaving the teaching to a notable faculty, which included Konrad Pellikan, Theodor Bibliander, Peter Martyr Vermigli, Conrad Gesner, and Bullinger's son-in-law Rudolf Gwalther.

==== Interactions with Anabaptists (1531–60) ====
Bullinger sortied against the Anabaptists in his 1531 work, Four Books to Warn the Faithful of the Shameless Disturbance, Offensive Confusion, and False Teachings of the Anabaptists. Although Bullinger regarded Anabaptists as unstable citizens who encouraged a society of chaos and superstition, in practice he allowed them to follow their consciences and refused to forbid their freedom of worship in Zurich. Bullinger upheld this principle of quasi-toleration for the rest of his life. During Bullinger's leadership of Zürich from 1531 to 1575, not a single Anabaptist was executed for his faith. By comparison, four Anabaptists were executed under Zwingli and forty in Bern. Nevertheless, when the Anabaptist Munster fell in 1534, he wrote, on behalf of the whole Zürich synod, a defense of the death penalty for Anabaptists who had offended the public peace. Bullinger eventually wrote a long history of the Anabaptists called On the Origins of Anabaptism (1560), which detailed their origin and spread in Europe. The book was widely disseminated and is still reflected in recent histories of Anabaptists.

==== Interactions with Lutherans (1536–45) ====
In 1536, Bullinger and other Protestant reformers, including Jud and Martin Bucer, drafted the First Helvetic Confession, an attempt to reach a consensus of Protestant belief. The confession, a combination of Zwinglian and Lutheran theology, was adopted by a number of Protestant churches, but Bullinger distrusted Bucer, and by 1538, negotiations to unite the Swiss and Lutheran churches broke down. During the last years of his life, Luther denounced the Swiss Zwinglians in his Short Confession of the Lord's Supper (1543), and Bullinger responded in 1545 with his own True Confession.

==== Cooperation with Geneva ====
By the 1540s, Bullinger had drawn closer to John Calvin of Geneva. Together they wrote a response to the Council of Trent, and then, in 1549, they jointly drafted the Consensus Tigurinus, an agreement between Calvinists and Zwinglians about the doctrine of the Eucharist.

In the early 1550s, Bullinger published his most significant work, Decades, a series of fifty sermons, written in Latin and published from 1548 to 1551, a series that effectively served as a systematic theology. The sermons were widely distributed, and Bullinger became even better known as a Reformer. Nevertheless, Bullinger's Zurich suffered bad weather, poor harvests, the bane of Swiss politics, and the plague. Bullinger's wife and daughter both died of the plague during the early 1560s, when the disease swept across central and western Europe.

Bullinger played a crucial role in drafting the Second Helvetic Confession of 1566. Bullinger had written the first draft in 1562 as a personal statement of faith, which in a 1564 revision, he intended to be presented to the Zürich Rathaus after his death. In 1566, after Frederick III the Pious, elector palatine, introduced Reformed elements into churches in his region, Bullinger had this statement of faith circulated among the Protestant cities of Switzerland; and it gained a favorable response in many Swiss cities, including Bern, Zürich, Schaffhausen, St. Gallen, Chur, and Geneva. The statement was also adopted by Reformed churches in Scotland (1566), Hungary (1567), France (1571), and Poland (1578). Only the Heidelberg Catechism was better known as a Reformed confession. The Second Helvetic Confession was also slightly modified to become the French Confession de Foy (1559), the Scottish Confessio Fidei (1560) the Belgian Ecclasiarum Belgicarum Confessio (1561) and the Heidelberg Catechism (1563) itself.

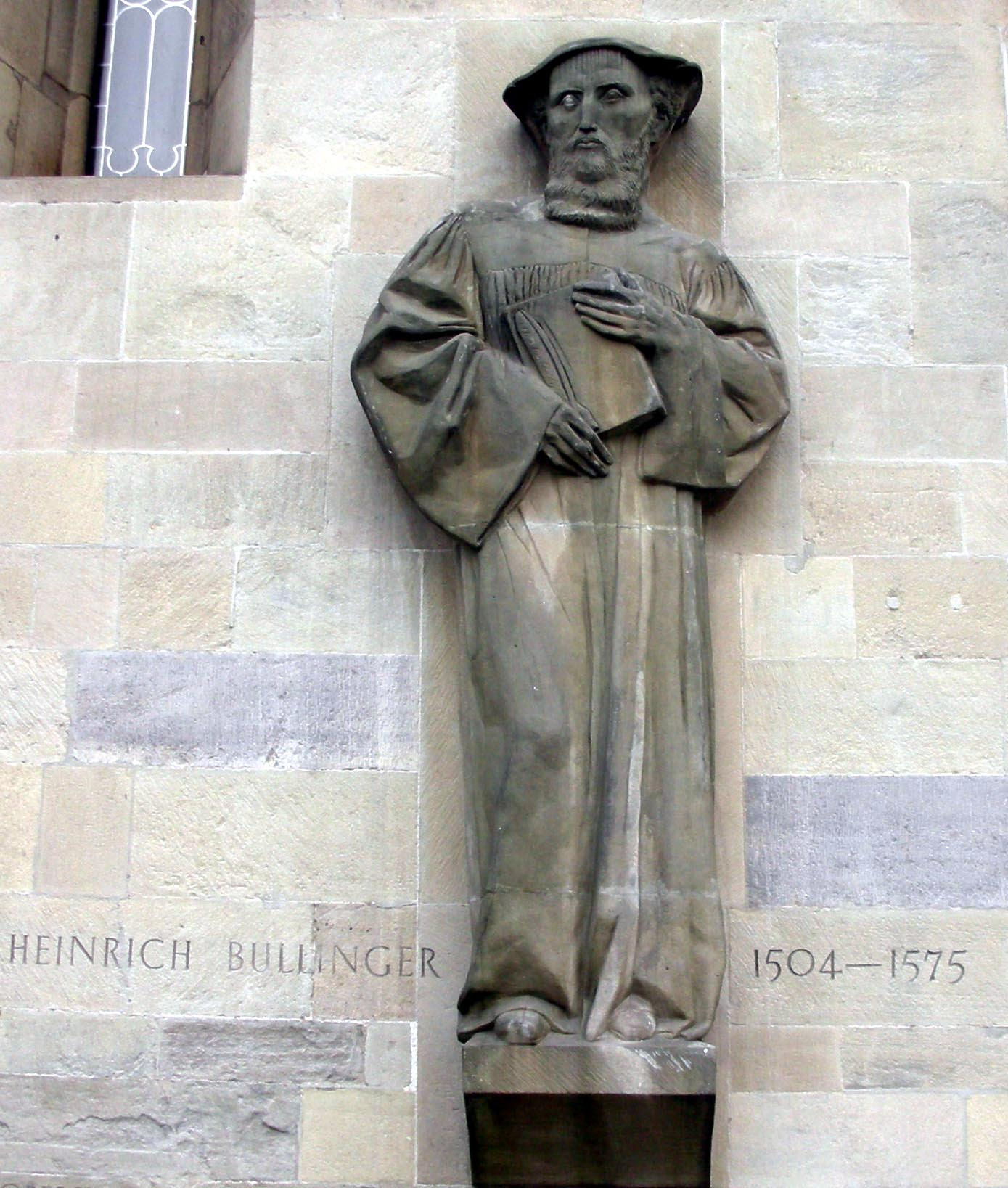
Sculpture of Bullinger at Grossmünster (Otto Charles Bänninger 1940)

==== Death ====
Bullinger died at Zürich in 1575 and was followed as antistes by Zwingli's adopted son Rudolf Gwalther.

== Theological views ==
=== The Eucharist ===
Bullinger's mature eucharistic theology differed notably from that of Zwingli. Though at first Bullinger viewed both the Old Covenant Passover feast and the New Covenant Lord's Supper as symbolic, a view reflected in the language of the First Helvetic Confession (1536), in 1544, in a pamphlet responding to Luther, Bullinger argued that the real spiritual presence of Christ occurred in the Eucharist. Bullinger thereafter linked the symbolic and spiritual presence in the Consensus Tigurinus of 1549, which he composed with Calvin, a formula codified in the Heidelberg Catechism (1563) and the Second Helvetic Confession (1562/4).

=== Covenant theology ===
Bullinger played an important role in developing covenant theology in the Reformed tradition. Bullinger initially used the covenants as an interpretive grid for eucharistic theology, but by the 1550s he employed the covenant as a theological category.

=== Baptism ===
Bullinger, like Zwingli, was a staunch advocate of infant baptism. As early as 1525, both argued that Old Covenant circumcision was the predecessor of New Covenant baptism.

== Works ==
Bullinger's writings exceed Luther and Calvin combined, including 12,000 surviving letters. During his lifetime they were translated in several languages and counted among the best known theological works in Europe.

=== Theological works ===
==== Helvetic Confessions ====
Bullinger was part of the drafting of the First Helvetic Confession, an early consensus document of the Reformation and expression of Swiss theology.

Bullinger was also part of the drafting of the Second Helvetic Confession of 1566, which he originally drafted himself in 1562 as a personal statement of faith.

==== The Decades ====
Bullinger's main theological work was the Dekaden, or The Decades, which is a compilation of 50 sermons that Bullinger published from 1549 to 1551. Many regard The Decades to be comparable to Calvin's Institutes of the Christian Religion and Peter Martyr Vermigli's Loci communes as an early Reformed theological explication. Though in sermon form, it was likely never actually delivered by Bullinger, but only written in imitation of the sermonic form. They are structured upon the Ten Commandments, the Apostles' Creed, the Lord's Prayer, and the two Protestant sacraments. The work was quickly translated from Latin into German, French, Dutch, and English, and was one of the most popular Protestant theological works in the sixteenth and seventeenth centuries. Indeed, it was so essential that it was termed "house book" by German and Dutch translators. The Dutch, at points, even required a copy of the book to be in all Dutch trading vessels by law, which led to its spread into America and Asia.

==== Other Theological Works ====
In 1531, Bullinger helped edit and write the preface to the Zürich Bible with Jud, Bibliander, and Pellikan. Many of his sermons were translated into English (reprinted, 4 vols., 1849). His works, mainly expository and polemical, have not been collected.

=== Historical ===
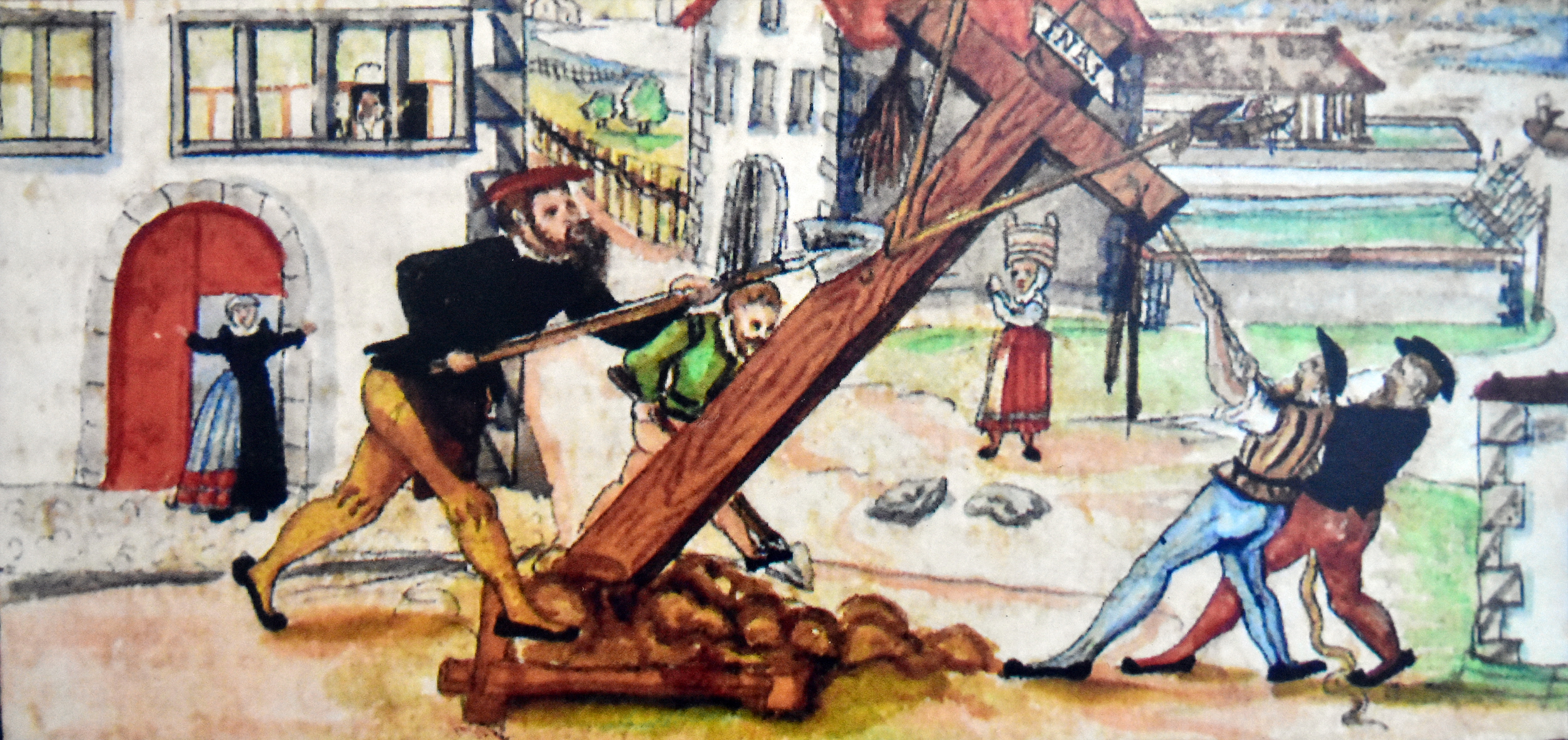
Iconoclasm during the Reformation in Zürich, Stadelhofen, illustrated Bullinger chronicle

Besides theological works, Bullinger also wrote some historical works of value. The "Tiguriner Chronik" is a history of Zürich from Roman times to the Reformation; others are a history of the Reformation and a history of the Swiss confederation. Bullinger also wrote in detail on Biblical chronology, working within the framework that was universal in the Christian theological tradition until the second half of the 17th century, namely that the Bible affords a faithful and normative reference for all ancient history.

=== Letters ===
There exist about 12,000 letters from and to Bullinger, the most extended correspondence preserved from Reformation times. He was called by German Reformation historian Rainer Henrich "a one-man communication system".

Bullinger was a personal friend and advisor of many leading personalities of the reformation era. He corresponded with Reformed, Anglican, Lutheran, and Baptist theologians, with Henry VIII, Edward VI, Lady Jane Grey, and Elizabeth I (all from England), Christian II of Denmark, Philipp I of Hesse and Frederick III, Elector Palatine.

== Legacy ==
Bullinger's Helvetic Confessions are still used by Reformed churches as a theological standard. His legacy as a writer and historian survives today. His idea of covenant influenced the development of covenant theology.

Among Bullinger's direct descendants were the Swiss painter Johann Balthasar Bullinger and the British theologian E.W. Bullinger.

=== Impact on England ===
Bullinger opened Zürich to Protestant fugitives from religious persecution in other countries. After the passing of the Six Articles in 1539 by Henry VIII of England, and again during the rule of Mary I from 1553 to 1558, Bullinger accepted many English fugitives. When the English fugitives returned to England after the death of Mary I, Bullinger's writings found a broad distribution in England. In England, from 1550 to 1560, there were 77 editions of Bullinger's Latin Decades and 137 editions of their vernacular translation House Book, a treatise in pastoral theology. In comparison, Calvin's Institutes had two editions in England during the same time. By 1586, John Whitgift, the Archbishop of Canterbury, ordered all non-graduate ordinands to buy and read Bullinger's Decades. Due to his involvement and correspondence with the English Reformers, some historians count Bullinger together with Bucer as the most influential theologian of the English Reformation.

Two of the English fugitives were John and Anne Hooper. Anne eventually became Bullinger's correspondent and in 1546, Bullinger became the godfather of Hooper's daughter during her infant baptism. Bullinger also accepted fugitives from northern Italy and France, especially after the St. Bartholomew's Day Massacre. Johann Pestalozzi was a descendant of the Italian fugitives.

Religious titles
Preceded by Huldrych Zwingli	Antistes of Zürich; 1532–1575	Succeeded by Rudolph Gualther
