= Matthew 5:19 =

- ← 5:18 5:20 →
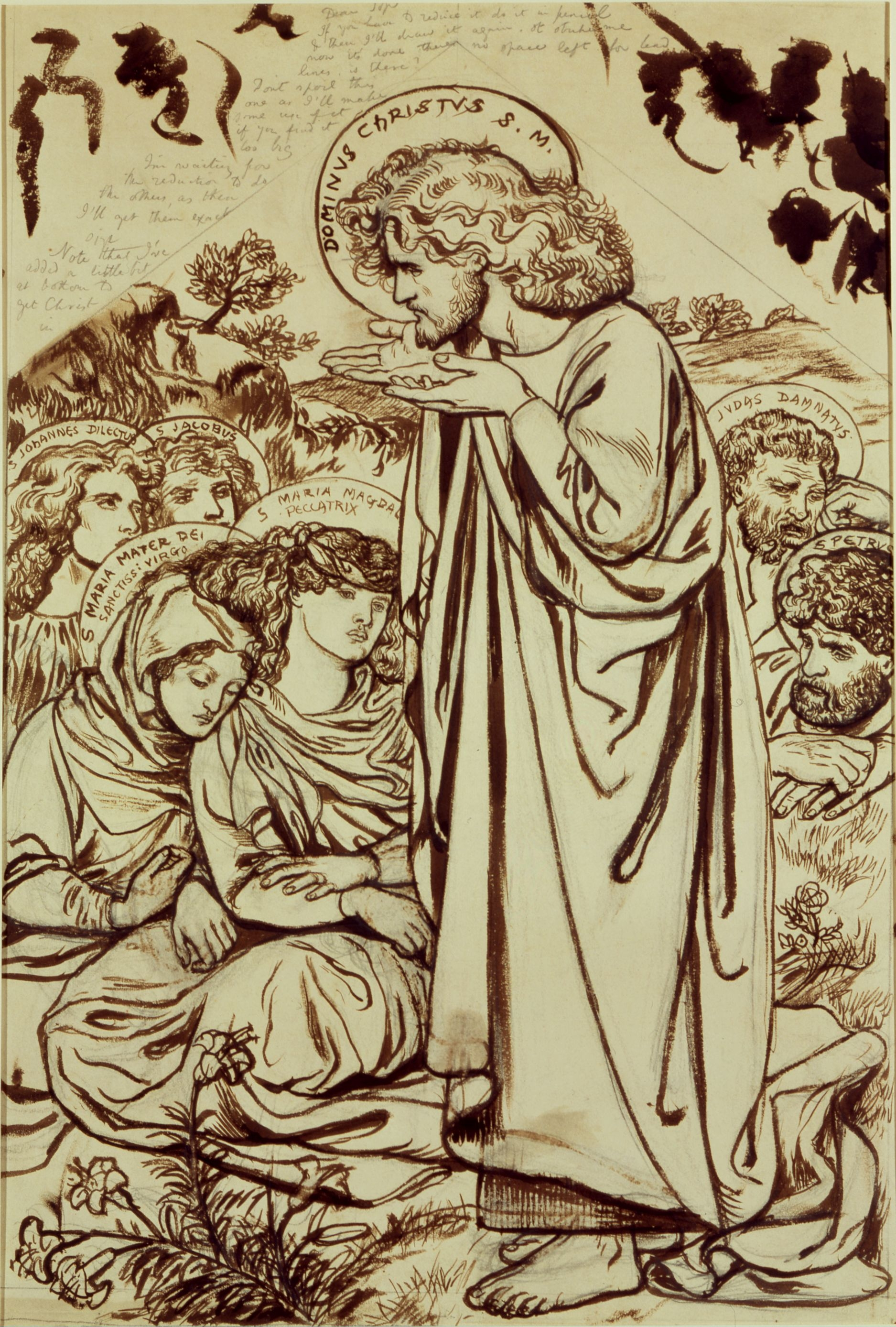
- "The Sermon on the Mount" (c. 1861), by Dante Gabriel Rossetti (1828–1882).
- Book: Gospel of Matthew
- Christian Bible part: New Testament

Matthew 5:19 is the nineteenth verse of the fifth chapter of the Gospel of Matthew in the New Testament and is part of the Sermon on the Mount. Jesus has reported that he came not to destroy the law, but fulfil it. In this verse he perhaps continues to reinforce this claim.

== Content ==
In the King James Version of the Bible, the text reads:

Whosoever therefore shall break one of these least
commandments, and shall teach men so, he shall be
called the least in the kingdom of heaven: but
whosoever shall do and teach them, the same
shall be called great in the kingdom of heaven.

The World English Bible translates the passage as:

Whoever, therefore, shall break one of these
least commandments, and teach others to do so,
shall be called least in the Kingdom of
Heaven; but whoever shall do and teach them
shall be called great in the Kingdom of Heaven.

The Novum Testamentum Graece text is:

ὃς ἐὰν οὖν λύσῃ μίαν τῶν ἐντολῶν τούτων τῶν ἐλαχίστων
καὶ διδάξῃ οὕτως τοὺς ἀνθρώπους,
ἐλάχιστος κληθήσεται ἐν τῇ βασιλείᾳ τῶν οὐρανῶν
ὃς δ’ ἂν ποιήσῃ καὶ διδάξῃ,
οὗτος μέγας κληθήσεται ἐν τῇ βασιλείᾳ τῶν οὐρανῶν.

== Analysis ==
Both the WEB and KJV have the prohibition refer to breaking the commandments. R. T. France feels this is incorrect as the Greek is closer to "shall set aside one of these." Jesus emphasizes that the fulfillment of the commandments or the law does not mean its abolition, as the law 'remains wholly authoritative and demands the fullest respects'.

The sentence structure makes it seem as though this verse is a restatement of the last two in the importance of the Mosaic law, but some disagree. Hill notes that Jesus refers to "these least commandments," but previously and throughout this gospel the law was a singular entity and is not described as a set of rules. Thus some interpret this passage as referring to the collection of rules Jesus is about to set out (the Sermon on the Mount), not the Old Testament ones called the Mosaic Law such as the Ten Commandments or Noahide Laws.

Hill also notes that in Jesus' time mainstream Judaism did make a distinction between lesser and greater commandments and supported the notion that the punishment for breaking a lesser one would be less than for breaking a great one. Some Jewish sects did disagree strongly with this view, however. There is some dispute about what Jesus meant by "least in the Kingdom of Heaven." Schweizer feels that this phrasing is just for literary effect and that it actually means that the law breakers would be excluded from the Kingdom of Heaven. Others feel that this verse does indicate that the Kingdom of Heaven will be divided into grades and that those who break minor commandments will be allowed in, but those who break major ones will not.

Hill notes that some scholars have read this verse as an attack on Paul, who is generally seen to have placed less importance on Mosaic law than the author of Matthew does. Those who support this view see it as based on Paul's description of himself in 1 Corinthians 15:9, where he calls himself "least of the apostles." Most scholars reject this view as there is little evidence that the author of Matthew had read Paul's works, and suggest that the Matthew passage should be read on its own terms.

== Commentary from the Church Fathers ==
Chrysostom: He speaks not this of the old laws, but of those which He was now going to enact, of which he says, the least, though they were all great. For as He so oft spoke humbly of Himself, so does He now speak humbly of His precepts.

Pseudo-Chrysostom: Otherwise; the precepts of Moses are easy to obey; Thou shall not kill. Thou shall not commit adultery. The very greatness of the crime is a check upon the desire of committing it; therefore the reward of observance is small, the sin of transgression great. But Christ's precepts, Thou shalt not be angry, Thou shalt not lust, are hard to obey, and therefore in their reward they are great, in their transgression, ‘least.’ It is thus He speaks of these precepts of Christ, such as Thou shall not be angry, Thou shalt not lust, as ‘the least;’ and they who commit these lesser sins, are the least in the kingdom of God; that is, he who has been angry and not sinned grievously is secure from the punishment of eternal damnation; yet he does not attain that glory which they attain who fulfil even these least.

Augustine: Or, the precepts of the Law are called ‘the least,’ as opposed to Christ's precepts which are great. The least commandments are signified by the iota and the point. He, therefore, who breaks them, and teaches men so, that is, to do as he does, shall be called least in the kingdom of heaven. Hence we may perhaps conclude, that it is not true that there shall none be there except they be great.

Glossa Ordinaria: By ‘break,’ is meant, the not doing what one understands rightly, or the not understanding what one has corrupted, or the destroying the perfectness of Christ's additions.

Chrysostom: Or, when you hear the words, least in the kingdom of heaven, imagine nothing less than the punishment of hell. For He oft uses the word ‘kingdom,’ not only of the joys of heaven, but of the time of the resurrection, and of the terrible coming of Christ.

Gregory the Great: Or, by the kingdom of heaven is to be understood the Church, in which that teacher who breaks a commandment is called least, because he whose life is despised, it remains that his preaching be also despised.

Hilary of Poitiers: Or, He calls the passion, and the cross, the least, which if one shall not confess openly, but be ashamed of them, he shall be least, that is, last, and as it were no man; but to him that confesses it He promises the great glory of a heavenly calling.

Jerome: This head is closely connected with the preceding. It is directed against the Pharisees, who, despising the commandments of God, set up traditions of their own, and means that their teaching the people would not avail themselves, if they destroyed the very least commandment in the Law. We may take it in another sense. The learning of the master if joined with sin however small, loses him the highest place, nor does it avail any to teach righteousness, if he destroys it in his life. Perfect bliss is for him who fulfils in deed what he teaches in word.

Augustine: Otherwise; he who breaks the least of these commandments, that is, of Moses’ Law, and teaches men so, shall be called the least; but he who shall do (these least), and so teach, shall not indeed be esteemed great, yet not so little as he who breaks them. That he should be great, he ought to do and to teach the things which Christ now teaches.

== Sources ==
- Allison, Dale C. Jr. (2007). "57. Matthew". In Barton, John; Muddiman, John (eds.). The Oxford Bible Commentary (first (paperback) ed.). Oxford University Press. pp. 844–886. ISBN 978-0199277186.
- France, R. T. (1994). "Matthew". In Carson, D. A.; France, R. T.; Motyer, J. A.; Wenham, G. J. (eds.). New Bible Commentary: 21st Century Edition (4, illustrated, reprint, revised ed.). Inter-Varsity Press. pp. 904–945. ISBN 9780851106489.

Preceded by Matthew 5:18	Gospel of Matthew; Chapter 5	Succeeded by Matthew 5:20
