= Johann Balthasar Bullinger =

Swiss landscape painter (1713–1793)

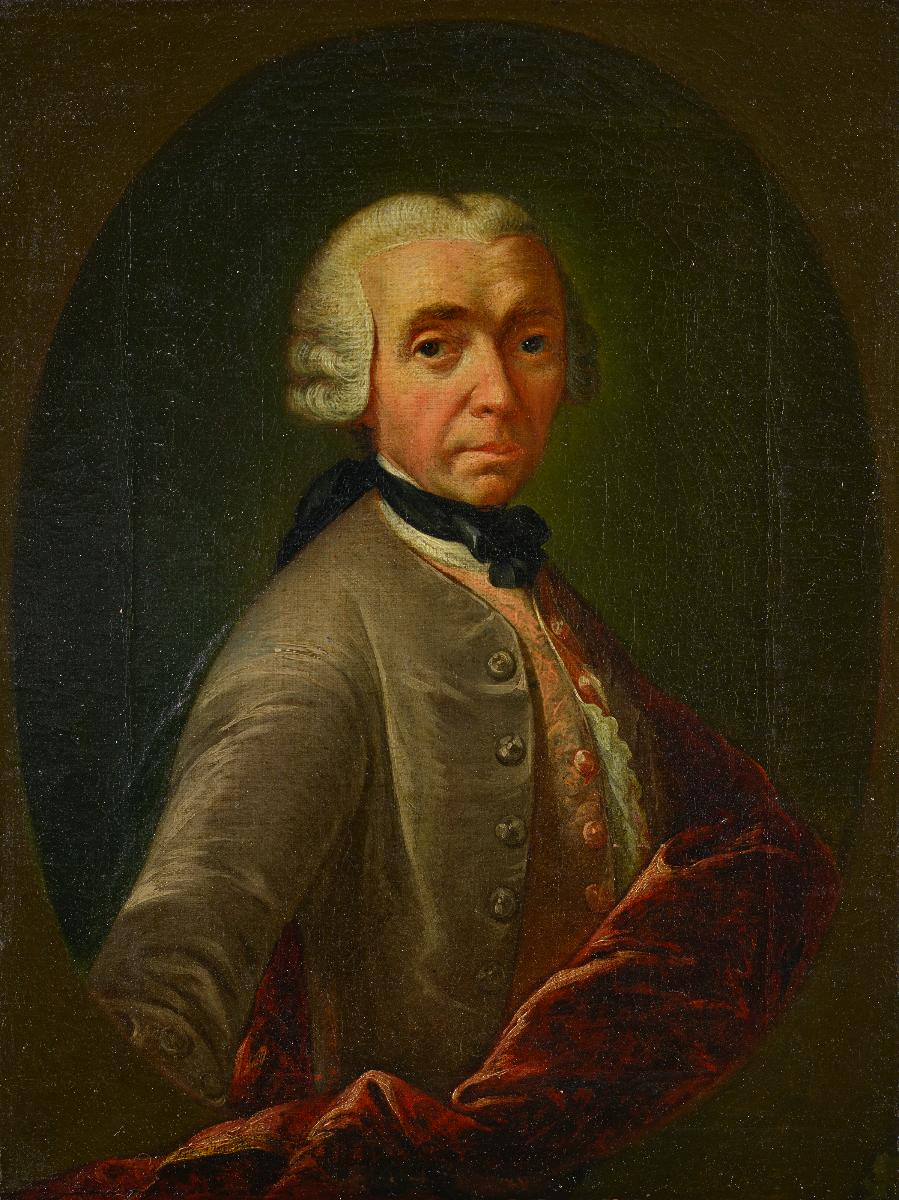
- Self-portrait of Bullinger
- Born: Johann Balthasar Bullinger; 30 November 1713; Langnau am Albis, Horgen, Old Swiss Confederacy
- Died: 31 March 1793 (aged 79); Zurich, Canton of Zurich, Old Swiss Confederacy
- Occupation: Landscape painter
- Relatives: Heinrich Bullinger, E.W. Bullinger

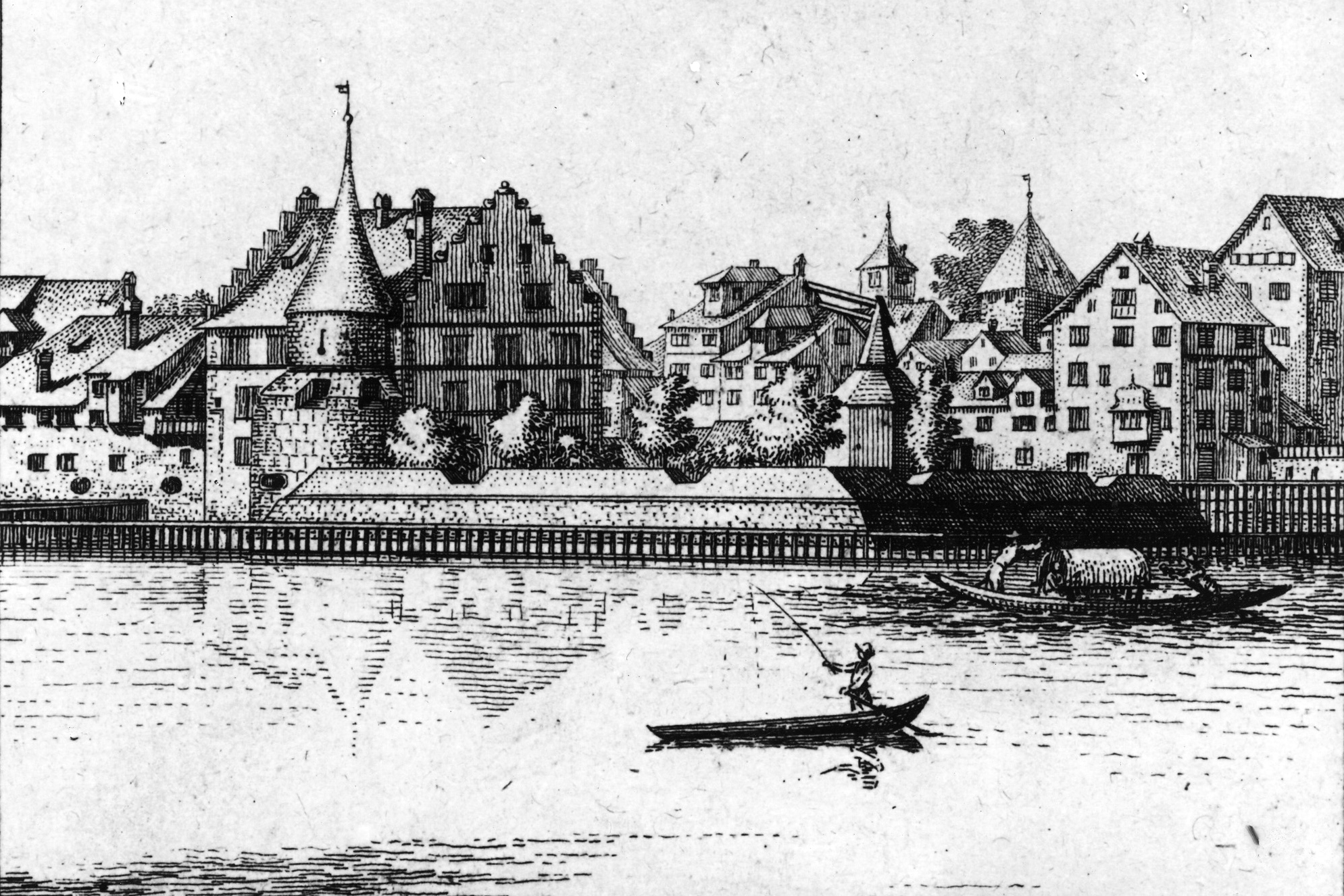
Drawing by Bullinger showing the Bauschänzli bulwark in 1770.

Johann Balthasar Bullinger (30 November 1713 – 31 March 1793) was a Swiss landscape painter.

== Life ==
Bullinger was born in Langnau am Albis, the son of Heinrich Bullinger, a clergyman. He was a 6x great-grandson of Swiss theologian Heinrich Bullinger. He was also a pupil of Johann Melchior Füssli and then of Johannes Simler, with whom he studied both painting and engraving. He then went to Venice, carrying a letter of introduction to Anton Maria Zanetti, who introduced him to Tiepolo, in whose studio he worked from 1732 until 1735. He first attempted historical painting, but then turned to landscapes, painting his first works in that genre in Steinbrugg in 1736. In 1737 he worked as a portraitist in Neuenburg. He spent the years between 1738 and 1741 in Amsterdam, where his work came under the influence of Dutch artists such as Both and Berchem. Bullinger also created the ceiling and wall paintings of the Zunfthaus zur Meisen, a guild house and present faience museum that was built at the Münsterhof plaza in Zürich in 1757.

He died in Zurich, Switzerland in 1793. One of his descendants included E. W. Bullinger.

== Etchings ==
He etched several plates in a free, painterly style; they include:

- The Portrait of J. B. Bullinger; se ipse fec.
- A Frontispiece, with a number of Genii.
- Two Mountainous Landscapes, with figures.
- A set of fifty Landscapes; some from his own designs, and the others after J. F. Ermels and F. Meyer.
- A Head; after Le Brun; engraved for Lavater's Work.
