= Charles H. Welch =

Christian theologian, writer and speaker

Charles Henry Welch (called C. H. Welch) (1880–1967) was a Christian dispensational theologian, writer and speaker.

During his lifetime he produced over 60 books, booklets and pamphlets, and more than 500 audio recordings. His most significant works are 56 bound volumes of the Berean Expositor, a Bible study magazine edited by Welch from 1906 until his death in 1967, and 10 volumes of The Alphabetical Analysis. He also taught his dispensational approach to the Bible with lectures throughout Great Britain, the Netherlands, France, Canada and the United States.

Welch promoted the Acts 28 position which he believed "is indeed of the utmost dispensational importance to the believer today. It marks a frontier." He believed the "dispensational truths" of the Acts period (29–62 AD) differed greatly from those written after the Acts period (see Meeting with E. W. Bullinger below).

== Early life ==
C. H. Welch was born in London, England, on 25 April 1880. When he left school at 14, he entered the leatherwork trade, his father's occupation, and remained in the industry until 1904, age 24.

In addition, his early years were influenced by the study of art at the Bermondsey Settlement.

From November 1900, he became a Christian after hearing an address by Leander W. Munhall titled "Sceptics and the Bible". He was amazed as he "listened to a man who was most evidently sane and scholarly, actually maintaining that the Scriptures were true!"

== Bible Training College ==
After his conversion to Christianity, young Welch actively attended church and various Christian meetings and lectures. During one of the classes he received a prize for writing "The Figurative Language of Scripture". Afterwards Welch was offered a position at the Bible Training College of London as part-time general secretary. While attending the college, he studied advanced Greek and Hebrew, teaching an elementary Greek class. It was during this time that Welch began to develop his dispensational approach to the Bible.

As his knowledge of the Scriptures grew, Welch disagreed with the direction of the Bible Training College which was forming a primitive church based upon the Sermon on the Mount and Acts 1 and 2. As a result of this conflict, he resigned in 1907 and began meeting with a small Bible study group. It was during this time that he created The Berean Expositor.

== Meeting with E. W. Bullinger ==
After his resignation from the Bible Training College in 1908, Welch read an article in E. W. Bullinger's Things To Come which he believed contained an anomaly; namely, if Israel had been set aside in God's plans at Acts 28:24–28 (approximately 62 AD), then the epistles of the New Testament written before and after this event should reflect such a change.

Welch wrote to Bullinger and soon met with him to discuss the relation of Paul's fourteen epistles to the boundary line of Acts 28. Although Bullinger had written many times previously concerning Israel's setting aside in God's dealings at Acts 28, he had continued to write about the New Testament epistles without reconciling the fact that some were written before, and some after Acts chapter 28.

At this meeting, Welch put forth the idea to the man for whom he had so much respect. Welch records that after pondering his proposal, Bullinger declared, "That scraps half the books I've written. But we want the Truth, and the Truth is in what you have said." Bullinger agreed the place of Acts 28 indeed had an important bearing on interpreting the New Testament. Then they both "discussed implications that arise from observing the relation of Paul's epistles to that boundary line" as follows:

Epistles Written Before Acts 28	Epistles Written After Acts 28
Galatians	Ephesians
1 Thessalonians	Philippians
2 Thessalonians	Colossians
Hebrews	Philemon
1 Corinthians	1 Timothy
2 Corinthians	Titus
Romans	2 Timothy

Although Bullinger died four and a half years after the meeting, his last book, Foundations of Dispensational Truth, reflected his understanding and acceptance of the division of the Pauline epistles written before and after the Acts 28 dividing line.

== After the meeting ==
When Bullinger was writing The Companion Bible, there was little time to continue his Things To Come journal. As a result, he asked Welch to take over as editor. His first article was titled, "The Unity of the Spirit (Eph 4:3): What is it?". He continued to write dispensational expositions in the journal until it ceased publication in 1915.

Although incomplete at his death, Bullinger's Companion Bible was fully published in 1922. Within The Companion Bible's appendixes is written an exposition by C.H. Welch titled, The Eight Parables of the Kingdom of Heaven in Matt. 13, Appendix 145. Although Welch wrote 24 more articles for the Appendixes related to the Acts 28 position, this was the only article published. Perplexed, Welch wrote to the committee in charge of completing The Companion Bible for an explanation. Their response was: "We do not know what Dr. Bullinger would have written, we can only go back and adopt what he has already written, although his last book, The Foundations of Dispensational Truth, proves that he fully accepted Acts 28 as the dispensational boundary and the segregation of The Prison Epistles."

In 1943, Welch adopted the Wilson St. Chapel in London as his church building, which he renamed The Chapel of the Opened Book. To preserve Welch's works and research, The Berean Publishing Trust and The Berean Forward Movement were established.

== Works ==
- Apostle of the Reconciliation (1923) ASIN B000GEE83U
- Testimony of the Lord's Prisoner (1931) ISBN 978-0-85156-0-53-3
- Just and the Justifier (1948) ASIN B0007B24DS
- Life Through His Name (1953) ASIN B000OHFMDO
- 'Dispensational Truth: Or, The Place of Israel and the Church in the Purpose of the Ages’ (1959) ISBN 978-0-85156-082-3
- Published posthumously, after Welch's death on 11 November 1967
  - In Heavenly Places: An Exposition of the Epistle to the Ephesians (1968) ASIN B0006BY6MQ
  - United Yet Divided (1976) ISBN 978-0-85156-057-1
  - The Berean Expositor, volumes 1–56 ASIN B000GJGAH2
  - From Pentecost to Prison, or The Acts of the Apostles, (1996) ASIN B000JY0S5O
  - Perfection or Perdition: An Exposition of the Book of Hebrews (1970) ASIN B000PDI220
  - Form of Sound Words, (1997) ISBN 978-0-85156-174-5
  - Welch's magazine continues to publish his works
