= Hans-Jörg Bullinger =

German scientist (born 1944)

Hans-Jörg Bullinger FREng
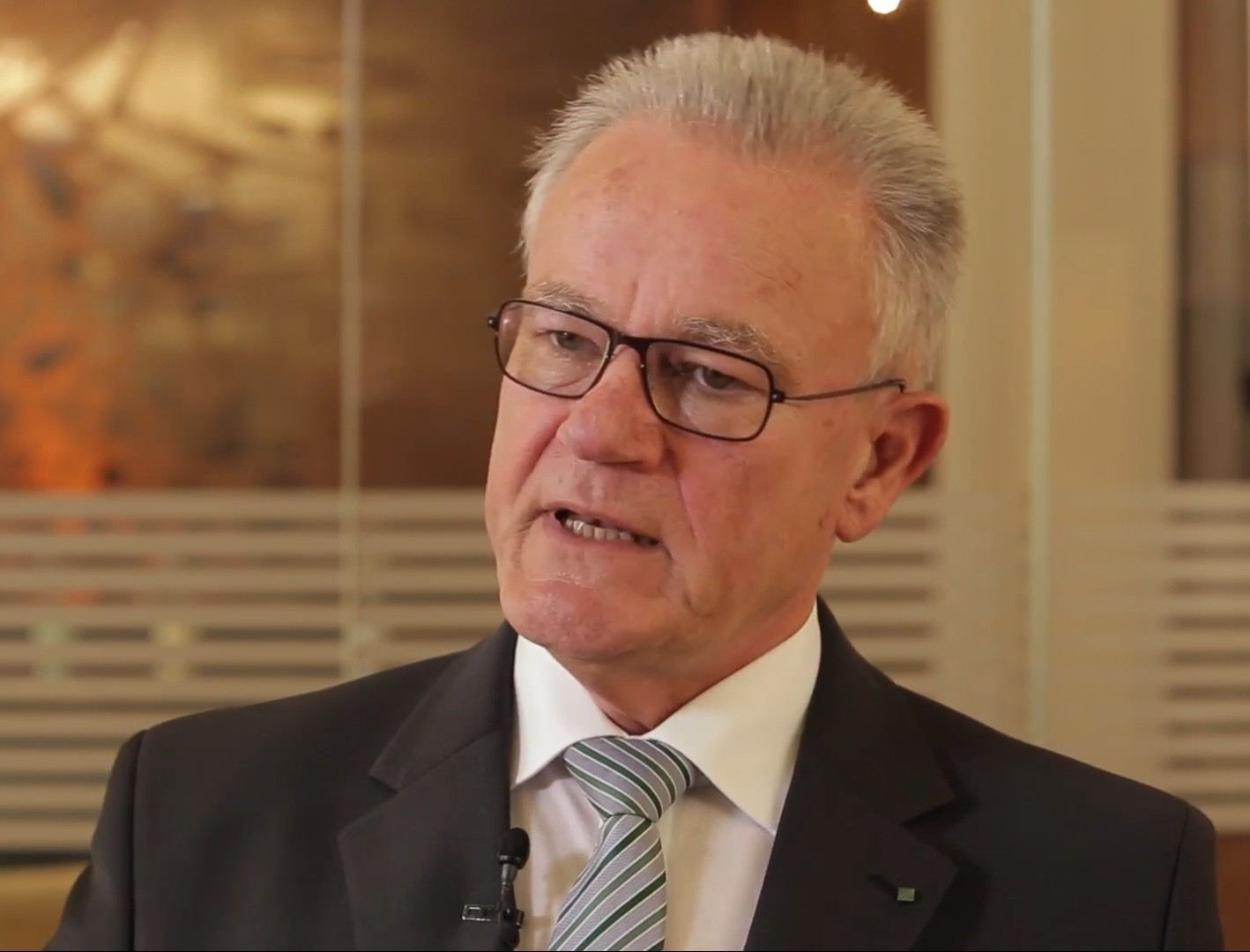
- Hans-Jörg Bullinger, in 2016
- Born: 13 April 1944 (age 82); Stuttgart, Germany
- Occupation: Mechanical engineer
- Title: President, Fraunhofer-Gesellschaft (2002–2012)
- Awards: Order of Merit of the Federal Republic of Germany: 1988: Medal; 2003: 1st Class; 2006: Knight Commander; Order of Merit of Baden-Württemberg (2009); Fellow, Royal Academy of Engineering (2013)

Academic background
- Education: Technische Oberschule; University of Novi Sad (honoris causa)

Hans-Jörg Bullinger (German pronunciation: [ˌhans ˌjœʁk ˈbʊlɪŋɐ], born 13 April 1944, in Stuttgart) is a German scientist and former president of the Fraunhofer-Gesellschaft.

The mechanical engineer with a doctoral degree was the Director of the Fraunhofer Institute for Industrial Engineering (Fraunhofer IAO) from its foundation in 1981 until 2002. He is also Professor of Industrial Science and Technology Management at the University of Stuttgart. From 2002 to 2012 he was the President of the Fraunhofer-Gesellschaft. He is also a member of the Scientific Board of AutoUni Wolfsburg.

In 1991, Bullinger was awarded an honorary doctorate from the University of Novi Sad.

From 1963 until 1966 he attended the Technische Oberschule in Stuttgart and passed the Abitur with a second-chance education.

== Awards ==
Bullinger is a member of acatech, the German academy of science and engineering. He has also received the following awards:

- 1998: Order of Merit of the Federal Republic of Germany (Bundesverdienstkreuz), medal and ribbon, awarded for outstanding services to German science, industry and society
- 2003: First Class Order of the Federal Republic of Germany (Bundesverdienstkreuz erster Klasse), awarded for extraordinary services to German science and research
- 2006: Knight Commander of the Order of Merit of the Federal Republic of Germany (Großes Verdienstkreuz mit Stern), for promoting the transfer of knowledge between science and industry
- 2009: Order of Merit of Baden-Württemberg (Verdienstorden des Landes Baden-Württemberg)
- 2012: Leonardo European Corporate Learning Award in the "Thought Leadership" category.
- 2013: International Fellow of the Royal Academy of Engineering

== Selected published works ==
- Morgenstadt — Wie wir morgen leben? [City of the future — how we will live tomorrow?] (in German). 2012.
- Bullinger, Hans-Jörg; Nof, Shimon Y. (February 2011). "Editorial: Human-centered design of systems in honor of Professor Gavriel Salvendy". Journal of Intelligent Manufacturing. 22 (1). doi:10.1007/s10845-009-0308-4.
