= Michel Le Nobletz =

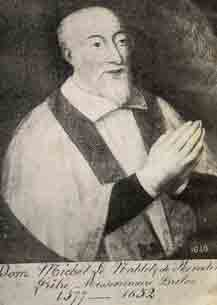
Michel le Nobletz

Dom Michel Le Nobletz (Breton: Mikel an Nobletz) (1577–1652) was a vigorous Counter-Reformation missionary active in the west of Brittany, who was responsible for a revival of popular Catholic culture. He developed new methods of teaching, and invented distinctive painted placards — known as taolennoù – which became widely used in the area.

His extremely severe views and denunciations of alleged vice among local business leaders and even other priests led to accusations that he was a fanatic; he was nicknamed "the mad priest". He was forced to leave Douarnenez because of the animosity he engendered.

The Church declared Nobletz "venerable" in 1897. The Bishop of Leon initiated his beatification in 1701, but it is still pending.

== Life ==
Nobletz was born in the manor of Kerodern in Plouguerneau (Leon) on 29 September 1577 into a noble family. His father was a royal notary.

=== Early career ===
His father sent him to join his four brothers at the University of Bordeaux in 1596. He then studied at the College of Jesuits at Agen, learning theology, ancient languages (Latin, Greek) and mathematics. It was during a pilgrimage to Toulouse he had decided his vocation, before coming to deepen his theology at the Jesuit college of Madelaine de Bordeaux. He returned to his native parish in 1606, where he devised a systematic method of meditation which includes a description of the ten pitfalls threatening the priestly life, placed on a chart.

Desiring to improve his knowledge, he went to study Hebrew at the Sorbonne. He was received into the priesthood in Paris. Back in Leon, motivated by his religious ideals, he refused a scholarly career that offered him a comfortable job, for a life of poverty devoted to the Gospel. To the dismay of his parents, he retired to Plouguerneau in a kind of cell erected in the rocks of the beach of Treménac'h. He spent one year there in poverty and asceticism.

=== Missions ===
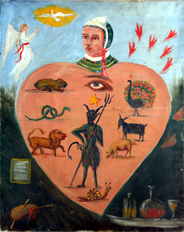
An allegorical placard of the type used by Nobletz, depicting a human heart dominated by the seven deadly sins

In 1608 he began his first mission, to the island of Ouessant, returning to the work that St. Vincent Ferrer had initiated early in the 15th century in Brittany. After a period with the Dominicans in Morlaix, he was forced to leave following a major scandal caused by his vandalizing a portrait-sculpture of a young woman placed over her grave. He believed that the image would encourage worship like the statue of a saint. He went on a preaching tour with Fr. Quintin. Together they travelled around Trégor and Léon from 1608 to 1611.

Nobletz travelled to the islands of Ouessant, Mullein, Batz (where he brandished a human skull taken from the ossuary), before returning to Conquet. His sister Margaret joined him there. Here in 1614 he developed the use of painted placards. These were created by Marguerite Alain Lestobec. The draw on the tradition of emblem books to use symbols to teach both religious and secular knowledge. To communicate with his audience of sailors and farmers Nobletz wrote words to be sung to popular tunes, even traditionally bawdy ones. The Bishop of Leon, who did not speak Breton, banned these songs where the tune seemed vulgar, until he was told the meaning of the words.

Nobletz also drew on help from pious women, starting with his sisters Anne and Marguerite Nobletz. For his reliance on women he was harshly criticized. Among them, there was Mademoiselle de Quisidic, the widows Douarnenez Claude Bellec, Dammath Rolland and Anne Keraudren, and the conquetoises Jeanne Le Gall and Francoise Troadec. He also enlisted the assistance of men, such as the cartographer Alain Lestobec and the fishermen Senan Fanch Su, Heny Pobeur, Bernard Poullaouec and Guillaume Coulloch.

Nobletz was authorized by the bishop of Quimper to evangelise in Cornouaille. He did so in Quimper, Le Faou, Concarneau and the surrounding area. The local people there engaged in superstitious practices which, according to him, constituted a return to paganism. Father Verjus, his biographer, relates that success crowned his efforts. After his mission in the Ile de Sein, he remained in Douarnenez from 1617 to 1639. There he perfected the use of the allegorical taolennoù paintings, and he wrote a number of Breton songs that complemented his teaching. According to Theodore Hersart de La Villemarqué, "In the islands, as most people were busy fishing, the holy bard followed them to where he found them gathered in large numbers, and mounting the highest point of their boats, he charmed their work by his songs".

=== Disputes ===
Nobletz's puritanical zeal, however, made him many enemies. His attacks on local business leaders and on other priests for alleged worldliness and moral failings led to complaints to the bishops that he was a fanatic. Nicknamed by his contemporaries ar beleg foll, "the mad priest", he was subject to accusations of bigotry, caused by his excesses and domineering character. He was even accused of emptying churches, as parishioners walked out when he began his sermons.

Driven from Douarnenez where he had become odious to the people because of his extravagant austerity, he returned to Conquet in 1639.

== Death and veneration ==
Nobletz remained in Conquet until his death, disabled by Parkinson's disease and suffering from speech difficulties. At Conquet he encountered the Jesuit Father Julien Maunoir, whom he had known in Quimper decade earlier, and who would become his successor.

After seven months of paralysis and a month of agony, Nobletz died on May 5, 1652, at Conquet. He was buried in the church of Lochrist. In 1856 his remains were transferred to the building which became the parish church of Conquet.

A cause for his beatification was formally opened on 9 April 1897, granting him the title of Servant of God. On 14 December 1918, Pope Benedict XV declared him Venerable.
