= E. W. Bullinger =

British Anglican clergyman, biblical scholar and theologian (1837-1913)

The Reverend E. W. Bullinger AKC
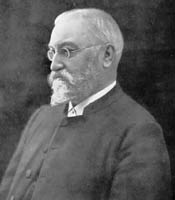
- Born: Ethelbert William Bullinger; 15 December 1837; Canterbury, Kent, England
- Died: 6 June 1913 (aged 75); London, England
- Education: King's College London (1860–1861)
- Occupations: Clergyman, Biblical scholar, and theologian
- Known for: The Companion Bible
- Relatives: Heinrich Bullinger, Johann Balthasar Bullinger

Ethelbert William Bullinger AKC (15 December 1837 – 6 June 1913) was an Anglican clergyman, biblical scholar, and ultradispensationalist theologian.

== Early life ==
He was born in Canterbury, Kent, England, the youngest of five children of William and Mary (Bent) Bullinger. His family traced their ancestry back to Heinrich Bullinger, the Swiss Reformer and Johann Balthasar Bullinger, a Swiss painter.

His formal theological training was at King's College London from 1860 to 1861, and he earned an associate degree. After graduation, on 15 October 1861, he married Emma Dobson, 13 years his senior. He later received a Doctor of Divinity in 1881 not from a university but from Archibald Campbell Tait, Archbishop of Canterbury, who cited Bullinger's "eminent service in the Church in the department of Biblical criticism".

== Career ==
Bullinger's career in the Church of England spanned from 1861 to 1888. He began as associate curate in the parish of St. Mary Magdalene, Bermondsey, in 1861, and was ordained as a priest in the Church of England in 1862. He served as parish curate in Tittleshall (1863–1866), Notting Hill (1866–1869), Leytonstone, (1869–1870) and Walthamstow until he became vicar of the new parish of St. Stephen's in 1874. He resigned his vicarage in 1888.

== Trinitarian Bible Society ==
In the spring of 1867, at the age of 29, Bullinger became clerical secretary of the Trinitarian Bible Society, which he held, with rare lapses for illness in his later years, until his death, in 1913.

The society's accomplishments during his secretariat include the following:

- The completion and publication of a Hebrew version of the New Testament under a TBS contract with Christian David Ginsburg after the demise of Isaac Salkinson.
- The publication of Ginsburg's first edition of the Tanakh (Introduction to the Massoretico-Critical Edition of the Hebrew Bible).
- The formation (1885) of the Brittany Evangelical Mission Society under Pasteur LeCoat and translation of the Bible into Breton.
- The first-ever Protestant Portuguese Reference Bible.
- Distribution of Spanish Bibles in Spain after the 1868 Spanish Revolution.

Bullinger and Ginsburg parted ways, and another edition of Tanakh was published by the British and Foreign Bible Society.

== Author ==
Bullinger was editor of a monthly journal Things to Come, subtitled A Journal of Biblical Literature, with Special Reference to Prophetic Truth. The Official Organ of Prophetic Conferences for over 20 years (1894–1915), and he contributed many articles.

In the great Anglican debate of the Victorian era, he belonged to the Low Church, rather than the High Church.

He wrote four major works:

- A Critical Lexicon and Concordance to the English and Greek New Testament (1877) ISBN 0-8254-2096-2
- Number in Scripture (1894) ISBN 0-8254-2204-3
- Figures of Speech Used in the Bible (1898) ISBN 0-8010-0559-0
- Primary editor of The Companion Bible (published in 6 parts, 1909–1922) ISBN 0-8254-2177-2. It was completed after his death by his associates.

As of 2020, those works and many others remain in print, or at least are reproduced on the Internet.

Bullinger was also a practiced musician. As part of his support for the Breton Mission, he collected and harmonized several previously-untranscribed Breton Hymns on his visits to Trémel, Brittany. He also published “Fifty original hymn-tunes” in 1874 which reached a third edition in 1897. The first, BULLINGER, is the only one still in use today, often sung to the words “I am trusting Thee, Lord Jesus”.

== Friends ==
Bullinger's friends included Zionist Dr. Theodor Herzl.

== Bullingerism ==
Bullinger's views were often unique and sometimes controversial. He is so closely tied to what is now called ultradispensationalism that it is sometimes referred to as Bullingerism. Bullingerism differed from mainstream dispensationalism on the beginning of the church. Mainstream dispensationalism holds that the Church began at Pentecost, as described early in the Acts of the Apostles. In contrast, Bullinger held that the Church, which the Apostle Paul revealed as the Body of Christ, began after the end of Acts, and was not revealed until the Prison Epistles of the Apostle Paul. Dispensationalist Harry A. Ironside (1876–1951) declared Bullingerism an "absolutely Satanic perversion of the truth."

Bullinger described dispensations as divine "administrations" or "arrangements" under which God deals at distinct time periods and with distinct groups of people "on distinct principles, and the doctrine relating to each must be kept distinct." He emphasizes, "Nothing but confusion can arise from reading into one dispensation that which relates to another." He lists seven dispensations:

Dispensational Scheme of Bullinger
Edenic state of Innocence	Period "without law"	Period under the Law	Period of Grace	Epoch of Judgment	Millennial Age	The Eternal State of Glory
Genesis 1-3 ended with the expulsion from Eden	Genesis 4 to Exodus 19 ended with the flood and judgment on Babel	Exodus 20 to Acts 28 ended at the rejection by Israel of the grace of God at the end of Acts	Church History will end at the Day of the Lord	Tribulation will end at the destruction of the Antichrist	Rev 20:4-6 will end with the destruction of Satan	Rev 20-22 will not end

== Other views ==
Other than ultradispensationalism, Bullinger had many unusual views. For example, Bullinger argued that the death of Jesus occurred on a Wednesday, not a Friday, after Pilate had condemned him at the previous midnight, and that Jesus was crucified on a single upright stake without crossbar with four, not just two, criminals and held that this last view was supported by a group of five crosses of different origins (all with crossbar) in Brittany (put together in the 18th century).

Bullinger argued for mortality of the soul, the cessation of the soul between death and resurrection. He did not express any views concerning the final state of the lost, but many of his followers hold to annihilationism.

Bullinger was a supporter of the theory of the Gospel in the Stars, which states the constellations to be pre-Christian expressions of Christian doctrine. In his book Number in Scripture he expounded his belief in the gematria or numerology values of words in Scripture (names and terms), a concept of which the Encyclopædia Britannica says: "Numerology sheds light on the innermost workings of the human mind but very little on the rest of the universe." He strongly opposed the theory of evolution and held that Adam was created in 4004 BC. He was a member of the Universal Zetetic Society, a group dedicated to believing and promoting the idea that the earth is flat, and on 7 March 1905, he chaired a meeting in Exeter Hall, London, in which the flat earth theory was expounded.

== Works ==
List of works

- Fifty Original Hymn-Tunes. London: Eyre & Spottiswode (1874)
- A Critical Lexicon and Concordance to the English and Greek New Testament (1877)
- Ten Sermons on the Second Advent (1892)
- The Witness of the Stars (1893)
- Number in Scripture (1894)
- Figures of Speech Used in the Bible (1898)
- Commentary on Revelation or, The Apocalypse (1902)
- The Church Epistles: Romans to Thessalonians (1902)
- The Book of Job, Including "The Oldest Lesson in the World (1903)
- Word Studies on the Holy Spirit (1905)
- The Two Natures in the Child of God (1906)
- The Chief Musician Or, Studies in the Psalms, and Their Titles (1908)
- The Companion Bible (ed., 1909, completed posthumously in 1922)
- How to Enjoy the Bible (1910)
- Great Cloud of Witnesses (1911)
- The Foundations of Dispensational Truth (1911)
