= James Inglis =

James or Jimmy Inglis may refer to:

- James Charles Inglis (1851–1911), British civil engineer
- James Inglis (evangelist) (1813–1872), American preacher and editor
- James Inglis (murderer) (1922–1951), Scottish man executed for murder
- James Inglis (physician) (1813–1851), Scottish physician, author and geologist
- James Inglis (psychologist), British/Canadian psychologist
- James Inglis (politician) (1845–1908), writer and politician in colonial New South Wales
- James Inglis, of the Inglis baronets
- Jimmy Inglis (footballer, born 1872), Scottish footballer
- Jimmy Inglis (footballer, born 1924) (1924-1999), Scottish footballer, see List of Bury F.C. players (1–24 appearances)
- Jimmy Inglis (footballer, born 1951), Scottish footballer
- James Inglis (rugby union) (born 1986), English rugby union player for Harlequins
- James Inglis (tailor), Scottish tailor who served James VI of Scotland
