= William J. Erdman =

American pastor and theologian (1834-1923)

William Jacob Erdman (1834–1923) was a pastor and theologian. He was a pastor of both Presbyterian and Congregationalist churches and was an editor of the Scofield Reference Bible. He was the father of Princeton Theological Seminary professor of Practical Theology Charles R. Erdman Sr.

Erdman was raised was raised in the Dutch Reformed Church. He studied at Hamilton College and Union Theological Seminary. He was ordained in the New School Presbyterian Church in 1860.

Erdman was pastor of Moody Bible Institute's Moody Church from 1875 to 1878. Some of his other pastorates were Jamestown, New York, 1878-1885; Boston, 1886-1888; and Asheville, North Carolina, 1888-1895.

He was a leader in the premillennialist and holiness movements of the late nineteenth century. He played a significant role in the Bible conference movement, noted for his skill in expository preaching as part of the Niagara conferences. Within the Niagara conferences, Erdman had a reputation for his knowledge of theology. He served as secretary and leader of the Niagara Bible Conference for twenty years. Until about 1900, he was a champion of dispensational premillennialism. However, Erdman was one of a handful of theologians involved with the Niagara conferences who later came to believe that Niagara had been teaching error regarding the belief in a secret rapture. By the early 1900s, he was teaching posttribulationism, believing the Church would pass through the Tribulation.

Erdman was an author of several essays in The Fundamentals, a set of essays considered to be the foundation of Christian fundamentalism.

The Scofield Reference Bible listed Erdman as one of seven "consulting editors". It is unclear to what extent any of the consulting editors were involved, and it is speculated that Scofield simply added these names to gain support for his Bible on both sides of the millennarian debate.

== Works ==
- The Holy Spirit and Christian Experience (1909)
- Outline Studies of the Gospel of John (1910)
- The Return of Christ (1913)
- Ecclessiastes, The book of the Natural Man (1920)

== Bibliography ==
- Balmer, Randall Herbert (2004). Encyclopedia of Evangelicalism. Baylor University Press. ISBN 978-1-932792-04-1.
- Kurian, George Thomas; Lamport, Mark A. (2016-11-10). Encyclopedia of Christianity in the United States: 5 Volumes. Bloomsbury Publishing USA. ISBN 979-8-7651-6836-3.
- Longfield, Bradley J. (1993-11-25). The Presbyterian Controversy: Fundamentalists, Modernists, and Moderates. Oxford University Press. ISBN 978-0-19-535871-1.
- Sandeen, Ernest R. (1978). The Roots of Fundamentalism: British and American Millenarianism, 1800-1930. Baker Book House. ISBN 978-0-8010-8147-7.
- Sandeen, Ernest R. (1967). "Toward a Historical Interpretation of the Origins of Fundamentalism". Church History. 36 (1): 66–83. doi:10.2307/3162345. ISSN 0009-6407.
