= Parable (film) =

- 1964 publicity poster
- Directed by: Rolf Forsberg; Tom Rook
- Written by: Rolf Forsberg
- Produced by: Fred A. Niles
- Starring: Tom Erhart; Madhur Jaffrey; Saeed Jaffrey; Clarence Mitchell
- Cinematography: Angelo Dellutri
- Edited by: James Miller
- Production company: Fred A. Niles Communications Centers Inc. of Chicago
- Distributed by: Council of Churches of the City of New York
- Release date: September 1, 1964 (1964 New York World's Fair)
- Running time: 20 minutes
- Country: United States
- Language: English

Parable is a 1964 American short Christian film written and directed by Rolf Forsberg, made for the Lutheran Council and became popular when first screened at the 1964 New York World's Fair in 1964, and again in 1965 at the Protestant Pavilion. The film depicts Christ as a clown and the world as a circus and is considered both a revolutionary Christian film and one which proved to be influential.

In 2012, the film was selected for preservation in the United States National Film Registry by the Library of Congress as being "culturally, historically, or aesthetically significant".

== Plot ==
The film Parable is presented through action and music alone and has no dialogue. It tells the story of handful of people working in an old fashioned circus under the rule of Magnus, a puppeteer who strings up human beings as living marionettes and controls their every move. Christ (Clarence Mitchell) is represented as a clown dressed in white, riding atop a donkey. The clown travels around the circus helping people with their problems and gaining followers until he finally takes the place of Magnus's human puppets and is strung up and murdered. Transformed by the clown's sacrifice, Magnus smears his face with white greasepaint and takes the clown's place on the donkey as Christ resurrected.

== Cast ==
- Tom Erhart as Punch
- Madhur Jaffrey as The Magician's Assistant
- Saeed Jaffrey as Circus Worker
- Clarence Mitchell as The Clown
- Baraboo East Elementary Students as Children in the audience

== Production ==
Parable was shot in 1964 at The Circus World Museum in Baraboo, Wisconsin. It was written and directed by Rolf Forsberg with an additional directing credit given to Tom Rook and producer credit to Fred Niles. The cast include Saeed Jaffrey, Madhur Jaffrey, Tom Erhart, and Clarence Mitchell. It is 20 minutes long and was shot on 35mm color film. Production company credit goes to the Fred A. Niles Communications Centers Inc. of Chicago; and the film is distributed through the Council of Churches of the City of New York.

=== Topic background ===
The origins of Christian media in America goes back to live performances of the Passion Play, the story of the final days of Jesus Christ from The Last Supper to his sacrifice and resurrection, performed by traveling acting troupes that often included a menagerie of animals. Upon the introduction of silent movies, Biblical films, like The Passion Play of Oberammergau of 1898 which was based on the 1634 Oberammergau Passion Play, From the Manger to the Cross in 1912, and Cecil B DeMille's King of Kings in 1927 helped to make Bible stories a popular cinematic subject. Other Christian films that were non-biblical in nature included Missionary movies, and Evangelical ministry films. During the early 20th Century many of America's ministers and Christian religious leaders condemned Hollywood as a "cesspool", saying that watching movies was a sin. During the 1960s a small corner of Christian filmmaking underwent a transformation from presenting static lectures, proselytizing, and presenting "sentimental" treatments of Bible stories, to becoming art films meant to evoke personal revelations about God in the viewer. Rolf Forsberg's Parable was one such film, portraying Christ as a clown and the world as a circus.

== Recognition ==
The film gained artistic accolades at its premiere in the Protestant Pavilion at the 1964 New York World's Fair In the years that followed, Parable won numerous awards including a Gold Lion from the Venice International Film Festival, a Hugo from the Chicago International Film Festival, and a citation from Cannes. This helped set the stage for a movement in Christian filmmaking that would strive to connect to the viewers on an artistic level instead of simply preaching.

Four years later, Parable was featured in the Christian pavillon at the Montreal permanent fair "Man and His World" during the summer of 1968.

Less than a decade after Parable was released, the figure of Christ portrayed as a clown was reprised in the musical Godspell, which the author said was inspired by the film Parable. Rolf Forsberg continued to make artistically inspired Christian films until he teamed up with Hal Lindsey in 1978 to write and direct the dramatic sequences in the apocalyptic movie The Late Great Planet Earth, which became one of the top-grossing films to back up their predication. In response to numerous inquries for the film, it was re-released by EcuFilm on the movie's 40th anniversary in 2004.

In 2012, Parable was inducted into the National Film Registry of The Library of Congress as a historic film that helped to shape American culture.

== See also ==
- List of American films of 1964
