= Carole C. Carlson =

American writer and ghost writer

Carole C. Carlson (February 10, 1925 - December 21, 1999) was an American author known for her contributions to religious literature. She was known as a ghostwriter for Hal Lindsey, who was described by some as the father of modern Bible prophecy. She wrote over twenty books, including works co-authored with David Jeremiah. Her most notable works include In My Father's House: The Years Before "the Hiding Place" by Corrie ten Boom, which she co-authored, and The Late Great Planet Earth.

== Background ==
Carole C. Carlson was born February 10, 1925 in Wheaton, Illinois. She graduated from the University of Wisconsin in 1946 with a degree in journalism.

After looking for personal fulfillment in education and upward mobility, Carlson eventually became involved in political activism in the 1960s. She was later "saved" at a Billy Graham Crusade.

Carlson credits God with directing her to Hal Lindsey, who was a prophecy expert who could not write. Carlson suggested to him that they write a book. The Late Great Planet Earth became a best seller. During the writing of a second book with Lindsey, Satan is Alive and Well on Planet Earth, Carlson's son, Kent, was killed in a plane crash in Simi Valley.

Carlson authored or co-authored more than 20 books, including works with Billy Graham, David Jeremiah, Dale Evans Rogers, and Corrie ten Boom.

In addition to work as an author and ghost writer, Carlson also was a frequent speaker and workshop lecturer at religious conferences.

Carlson considered meeting Corrie ten Boom to be one of her most meaningful experiences. She lived with ten Boom in the Netherlands while researching her book.

Carlson died on December 21, 1999.

== Works ==
=== Author ===
- Straw Houses in the Wind (1974)
- Established in Eden (1978)
- Corrie Ten Boom, Her Life, Her Faith: A Biography (1984)
- A Light in Babylon: A Novel Based on the Life of Daniel (1985)

=== Co-author ===
- The Late Great Planet Earth by Hal Lindsey (1970)
- Satan Is Alive and Well on Planet Earth by Hal Lindsey (1972)
- In My Father's House: The Years Before "The Hiding Place" by Corrie ten Boom (1976)
- The Terminal Generation by Hal Lindsey (1977)
- Woman by Dale Evans (1980)
- Grandparents Can by Dale Evans (1983)
- Say Yes to Your Potential by Skip Ross (1983)
- Exposing the Myths of Parenthood by David Jeremiah (1988)
- Escape the Coming Night by David Jeremiah (1991)
- The Handwriting on the Wall: Secrets from the Prophecies of Daniel by David Jeremiah (1992)
- The Teacher Who Couldn't Read by John Corcoran (1994)
- Invasion of Other Gods: The Seduction of New Age Spirituality by David Jeremiah (1995)
- Our Values: Stories and Wisdom by Dale Evans (1999)
