= C. I. Scofield =

American theologian, minister and writer (1843 – 1921)

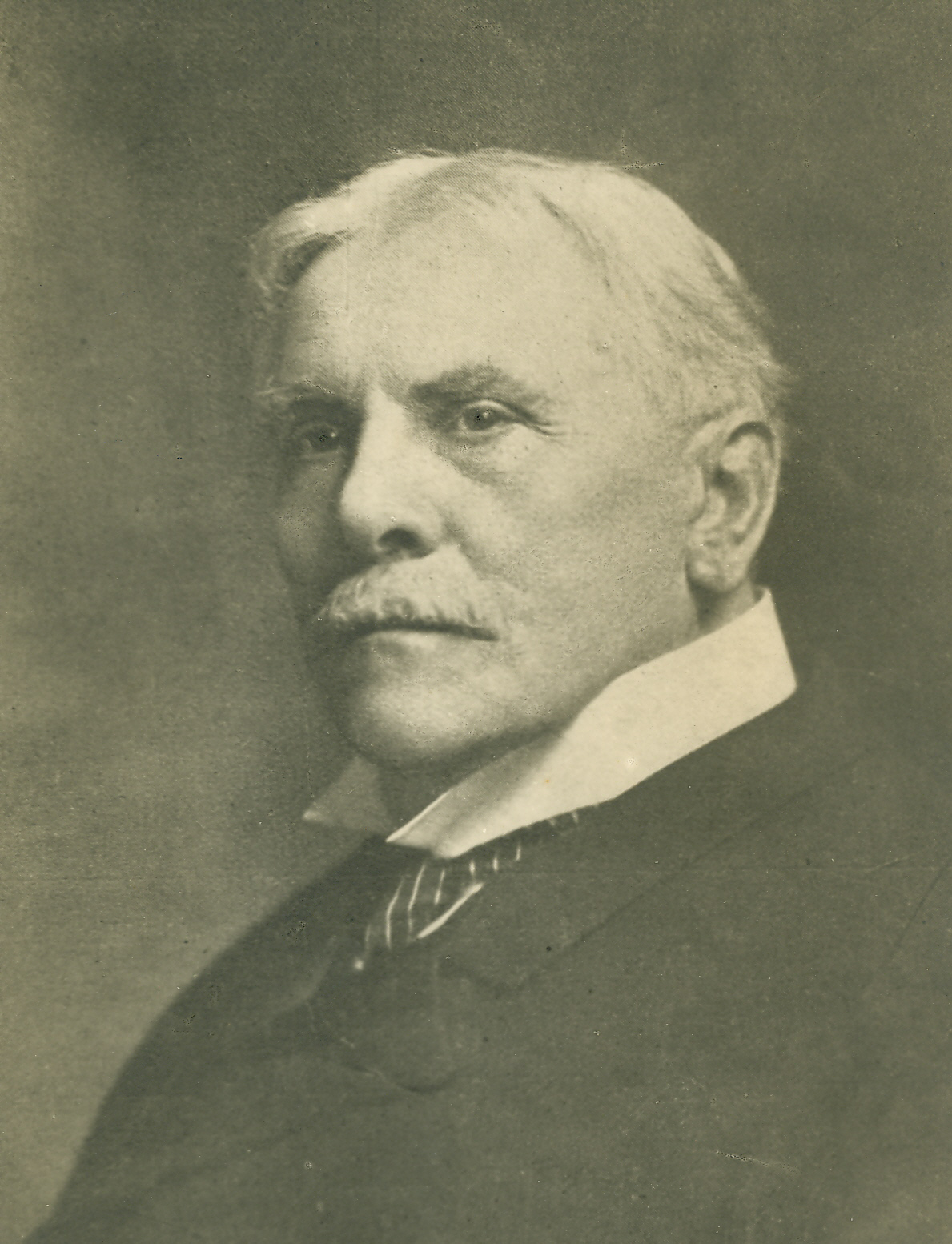
C. I. Scofield, c. 1920

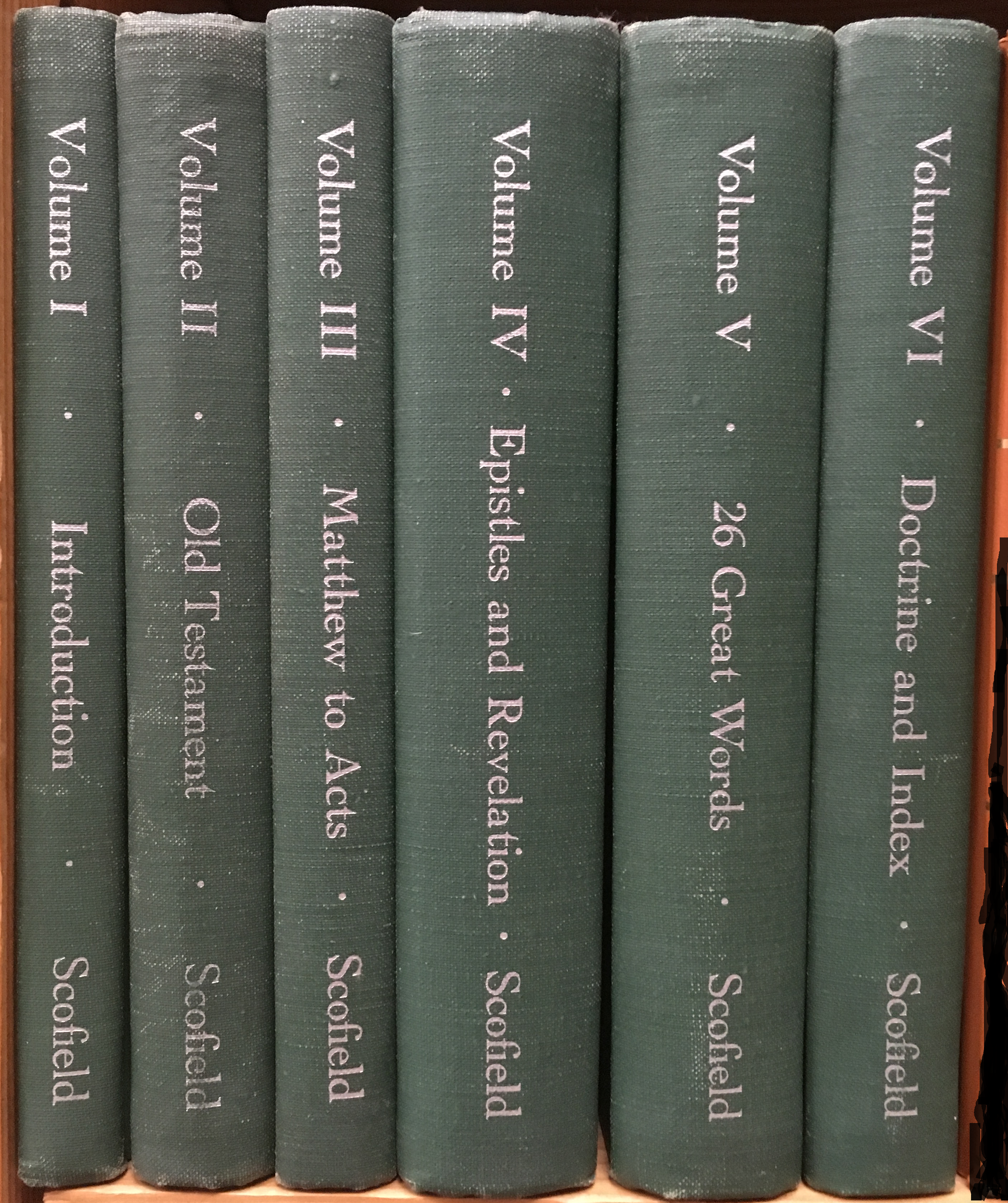
The spines from a set of six volumes by Scofield

Cyrus Ingerson Scofield (August 19, 1843 – July 24, 1921) was an American theologian, minister, and writer whose best-selling annotated Bible popularized futurism and dispensationalism among fundamentalist Christians.

== Biography ==
=== Childhood ===
Scofield was born in Clinton Township, Lenawee County, Michigan, the seventh and last child of Elias and Abigail Goodrich Scofield. Elias Scofield's ancestors were of English and Puritan descent, but the family was nominally Episcopalian. Abigail Scofield died three months after Cyrus' birth, and his father twice remarried during Cyrus's childhood. Details of his early education are unknown, but there is no reason to doubt his later testimony that he was an enthusiastic reader and that he had studied Shakespeare and Homer.

=== Civil War service ===
In 1861, Scofield was visiting relatives in Lebanon, Tennessee. At the beginning of the American Civil War, the 17-year-old Scofield enlisted as a private in the 7th Tennessee Infantry, Confederate States of America. His regiment fought at Cheat Mountain, Seven Pines, and Antietam. In 1862, after spending a month in Chimborazo Hospital in Richmond, Virginia, Scofield successfully petitioned for a discharge. Scofield then returned to Lebanon and was conscripted again into Confederate service. Ordered to McMinnville, Tennessee, Scofield deserted and escaped behind Union lines in Bowling Green, Kentucky. After taking the Union oath of allegiance, Scofield was allowed safe passage to St. Louis, Missouri, where he settled.

=== Lawyer and politician ===
In 1866, he married Leontine LeBeau Cerrè, a member of a prominent French Catholic family in St. Louis. Scofield apprenticed in the law office of his brother-in-law and then worked in the St. Louis assessor's office before moving to Atchison, Kansas, in late 1869. In 1871, Scofield was elected to the Kansas House of Representatives, first from Atchison for one year and then from Nemaha County, for a second. In 1873 he worked for the election of John J. Ingalls as senator from Kansas, and when Ingalls won, he had Scofield appointed U. S. District Attorney for Kansas—at 29, the youngest in the country. Nevertheless, that same year Scofield was forced to resign "under a cloud of scandal" because of questionable financial transactions, which may have included accepting bribes from railroads, stealing political contributions intended for Ingalls, and securing bank promissory notes by forging signatures. It is possible Scofield was jailed on forgery charges, although there is no extant evidence in the public records.

Perhaps in part because of his self-confessed heavy drinking, Scofield abandoned his wife and two daughters during this period. Leontine Cerrè Scofield divorced him on grounds of desertion in 1883, and the same year Scofield married Hettie Hall von Wartz, with whom he eventually had a son.

=== Conversion and ministerial career ===
==== Pastorates ====
According to Scofield, he was converted to evangelical Christianity through the testimony of a lawyer acquaintance. Certainly by the late fall of 1879, Scofield was assisting in the St. Louis evangelistic campaign conducted by Dwight L. Moody, and he served as the secretary of the St. Louis YMCA. Significantly, Scofield came under the mentorship of James Hall Brookes, pastor of Walnut Street Presbyterian Church, St. Louis, a prominent dispensational premillennialist.

In October 1883, Scofield was ordained as a Congregationalist minister—while his divorce was proceeding but not yet final—and he accepted the pastorate of a small mission church founded by that denomination, which became the First Congregational Church of Dallas, Texas (now Scofield Memorial Church). The church grew from 14 to over 500 members before he resigned its pastorate in 1895. In 1895, Scofield was called as pastor of Moody's church, the Trinitarian Congregational Church of East Northfield, Massachusetts. Scofield also attempted with limited success to take charge of Moody's Northfield Bible Training School.

==== Interest in missions ====
In 1888, Scofield attended the Niagara Bible Conference where he met pioneer missionary to China, Hudson Taylor. Taylor's approach to Christian missions influenced Scofield to found the Central American Mission in 1890 (now Camino Global). Scofield also served as superintendent of the American Home Missionary Society of Texas and Louisiana. In 1890, he founded Lake Charles College (1890–1899) in Lake Charles, Louisiana.

==== Fundamentalist leader ====
As the author of the pamphlet "Rightly Dividing the Word of Truth" (1888), Scofield soon became a leader in dispensational premillennialism, a forerunner of 20th-century Christian fundamentalism. Although in theory Scofield returned to his Dallas pastorate in 1903, his projected reference Bible consumed much of his energy, and he was also mostly either unwell or in Europe. When the Scofield Reference Bible was published in 1909, it quickly became the most influential statement of dispensational premillennialism, and Scofield's popularity as Bible conference speaker increased as his health continued to decline. Royalties from the work were substantial, and Scofield bought real estate in Dallas, Ashuelot, New Hampshire, and Douglaston, Long Island. He also joined the prestigious Lotos Club.

Scofield left the liberalizing Congregational Church to become a Southern Presbyterian and moved to the New York City area where he supervised a correspondence and lay institute, the New York Night School of the Bible. In 1914, he founded the Philadelphia School of the Bible in Philadelphia (now Cairn University).

==== Personal life ====
During the early 1890s, Scofield began styling himself Rev. C. I. Scofield, D.D.; but there are no extant records of any academic institution having granted him the honorary Doctor of Divinity degree. Scofield's second wife proved a faithful companion and editing assistant, but his relationships with his children, including librarian Abigail Scofield Kellogg, were distant at best. Scofield died at his home in New York City in 1921.

== Religious significance ==
Scofield's correspondence Bible study course was the basis for his Reference Bible: an annotated and widely circulated study Bible first published in 1909 by Oxford University Press. Scofield's notes teach futurism and dispensationalism, a theology advanced in the early 19th century by the Anglo-Irish clergyman John Nelson Darby, who like Scofield had been trained as a lawyer. Dispensationalism emphasizes the distinctions between the New Testament Church and ancient Israel of the Old Testament. Scofield believed that between creation and the final judgment there are seven distinct eras of God's dealing with humanity and that these eras are a framework around which the message of the Bible can be explained. It was largely through the influence of Scofield's notes that dispensational premillennialism became influential among fundamentalist Christians in the United States, and these notes became a significant source for popular religious writers such as Hal Lindsey.

Scofield, particularly through the Scofield Reference Bible, had a significant influence on the Christian Zionist movement. Scofield believed that Islamic holy sites would be destroyed and the Temple in Jerusalem would be rebuilt. In the Scofield Bible, he wrote that antisemitism was a sin. Citing Genesis 12:3—"I will bless them that bless thee"—Scofield argues "The man or nation that lifts a voice or hand against Israel invites the wrath of God."

=== Soteriology ===
Scofield was a type of Calvinist. However, he rejected limited atonement and attempted to teach only a softer form of the perseverance of the saints. He rejected any notions of placing one's assurance in their sanctification. Scofield's understanding of eternal rewards has influenced those of modern Free Grace theologians.

=== Anthropology ===
Scofield held to trichotomy, interpreting man as a trifold being, with a body, soul and spirit, viewing the threeness of humanity to be derived from the image of the triune God.
