= Council of Churches of the City of New York =

The Council of Churches of the City of New York (CCCNY) was established in 1815 as the Brooklyn Church and Mission Society. It is the oldest ecumenical council of churches in the United States. The council represents 1.5 million Protestants, Anglicans and Orthodox Christians. A. R. Bernard is the president of the council.

== Milestones ==
In 1957 the council sponsored Billy Graham's crusade in a New York City mission in Madison Square Garden, which ran nightly for 16 weeks. Since 1963 the council has organized the Family of Man annual banquet. In 1989, the council began to focus on public policy issues and advocacy for the poor.

== The Family of Man Medallion ==
The Family of Man Medallion is awarded to "individuals who exemplify excellence in the use of God-given talents in the service of humankind." Since 1963 the council has presented the award to recipients such as the former United States presidents: John F. Kennedy, Dwight D. Eisenhower, Gerald Ford, Richard M. Nixon, and Jimmy Carter. The award was also presented to John D. Rockefeller III. Israeli Prime Minister Menachem Begin and Egyptian President Anwar Sadat received the award in 1978. In 2005, David Yonggi Cho was the twenty-fifth person and the first Asian man to receive The Family of Man Medallion.

== Outreach ==
In the 1960s, the Council built the Protestant Chapel at JFK International Airport Terminal 4. The chapel provides Sunday worship, Bible study, and chapel counselling to airport employees and the travelling public.

The Council built the Protestant-Orthodox Pavilion at the 1964-1965 New York World's Fair and sponsored the production of the film Parable, directed by Rolf Forsberg, which was the principal attraction in the pavilion. The film depicted humanity as a traveling circus and Christ as a clown. The clown was played by Clarence Mitchell, Tom Erhart portrayed Punch, and Madhur Jaffrey played a magician's assistant. Over three million people visited the pavilion. The film was initially criticized as sacrilegious, but it was well received at the fair and in later showings. However, in building and operating the pavilion the Council incurred a debt of more than $400,000, which took five years to repay.

== Historical names of the Council ==
The council's name was changed several times over its history. In 1968, it adopted its current name, replacing the previous name of Protestant Council of the City of New York.

- 1895–1901: New York Federation of Churches and Christian Workers
- 1901–1925: The Federation of Churches and Christian Organizations in New York City
- 1925–1943: The Greater New York Federation of Churches
- 1943–1968: The Protestant Council of the City of New York
- 1968 – Today: The Council of Churches of the City of New York
