= Charles R. Erdman Sr. =

American Presbyterian minister and theologian

Charles Rosenbury Erdman Sr. (1866–1960) was an American Presbyterian minister and professor of theology at Princeton Theological Seminary.

== Early life and education ==
Erdman was born on July 20, 1866, in Fayetteville, New York, to William J. Erdman, a leader in the premillennialist and holiness movements of the late nineteenth century. He earned his B.A. (1886) from the College of New Jersey (now Princeton University) and went on to study at Princeton Theological Seminary from 1887 to 1891. Erdman was ordained on May 8, 1891, in the Presbytery of Philadelphia North, PCUSA.

== Career ==
Erdman served as pastor of Overbrook Presbyterian Church in Philadelphia from 1891 to 1897, and then at First Presbyterian Church in Germantown from 1897 to 1906. He joined the faculty at Princeton Theological Seminary in 1905, where he served as professor of practical theology until his retirement in 1936. During that time, Erdman was elected the Moderator of the General Assembly of the Presbyterian Church in the United States of America in 1925, and also served as pastor of First Presbyterian Church in Princeton, New Jersey, from 1924 to 1934.

Erdman was a major voice for tolerance toward deviation from the Westminster Standards, in opposition to J. Gresham Machen, which led to the reorganization of the seminary and some faculty breaking off from Princeton to form Westminster Theological Seminary in 1929.

During his time in Princeton Erdman was instrumental in bringing to Princeton the Westminster Choir College, where a building bears his name, and the American Boychoir School. The site of his former home is now occupied by Princeton Seminary's Erdman Hall which is named in honor of Charles and Estelle Erdman; it houses the Erdman Center.

== Death ==
Erdman died in 1960 and is buried in the Princeton Cemetery of the Nassau Presbyterian Church.

== Selected publications ==
Erdman was the author of over thirty popular biblical commentaries and books of pastoral theology. In addition to his books, two of his essays entitled "The Coming of Christ" and "The Church and Socialism" were included in The Fundamentals, a set of ninety essays regarded as the origin of Christian fundamentalism.

- "Modern Spiritual Movements" in Biblical and theological studies, Princeton Theological Seminary, ed. (1912)
- Coming to The Communion (1912)
- The Gospel of Mark: an exposition (1917)
- The General epistles: an exposition (1918) ISBN 1-103-51270-6
- The Acts: An Exposition (1919) ISBN 1-103-77622-3
- The Gospel of Matthew: an exposition (1920) ISBN 0-8010-3402-7
- The Gospel of Luke: an exposition (1921) ISBN 1-4068-9262-9
- The Gospel of John: an exposition (1922) ISBN 1-4588-7787-6
- The Return of Christ (1922)
- Within the Gateways of the Far East: A Record of Recent Travel (1922) ISBN 1-103-87711-9
- The First epistle of Paul to the Corinthians: an exposition (1928) ISBN 0-8010-3394-2
- The Epistle of Paul to the Ephesians: an exposition (1931) ISBN
- The Epistles of Paul to the Colossians and to Philemon: an exposition (1933) ISBN 0-8010-3393-4
- The Epistle to the Hebrews: an exposition (1934) ISBN 0-8010-3399-3
- The Revelation of John: an exposition (1936) ISBN 0-8010-3405-1
- The Pastoral epistles of Paul: an exposition (1966) ISBN 1-113-58903-5
- The Epistle of Paul to the Galatians: An Exposition (1930) ISBN
- The Epistle of Paul to the Romans: An Exposition (1925)

Religious titles
Preceded by The Rev. Clarence E. Macartney	Moderator of the 137th General Assembly of the Presbyterian Church in the United States of America; 1925–1926	Succeeded by The Rev. William Oxley Thompson
