= Scofield Reference Bible =

Protestant Study Bible

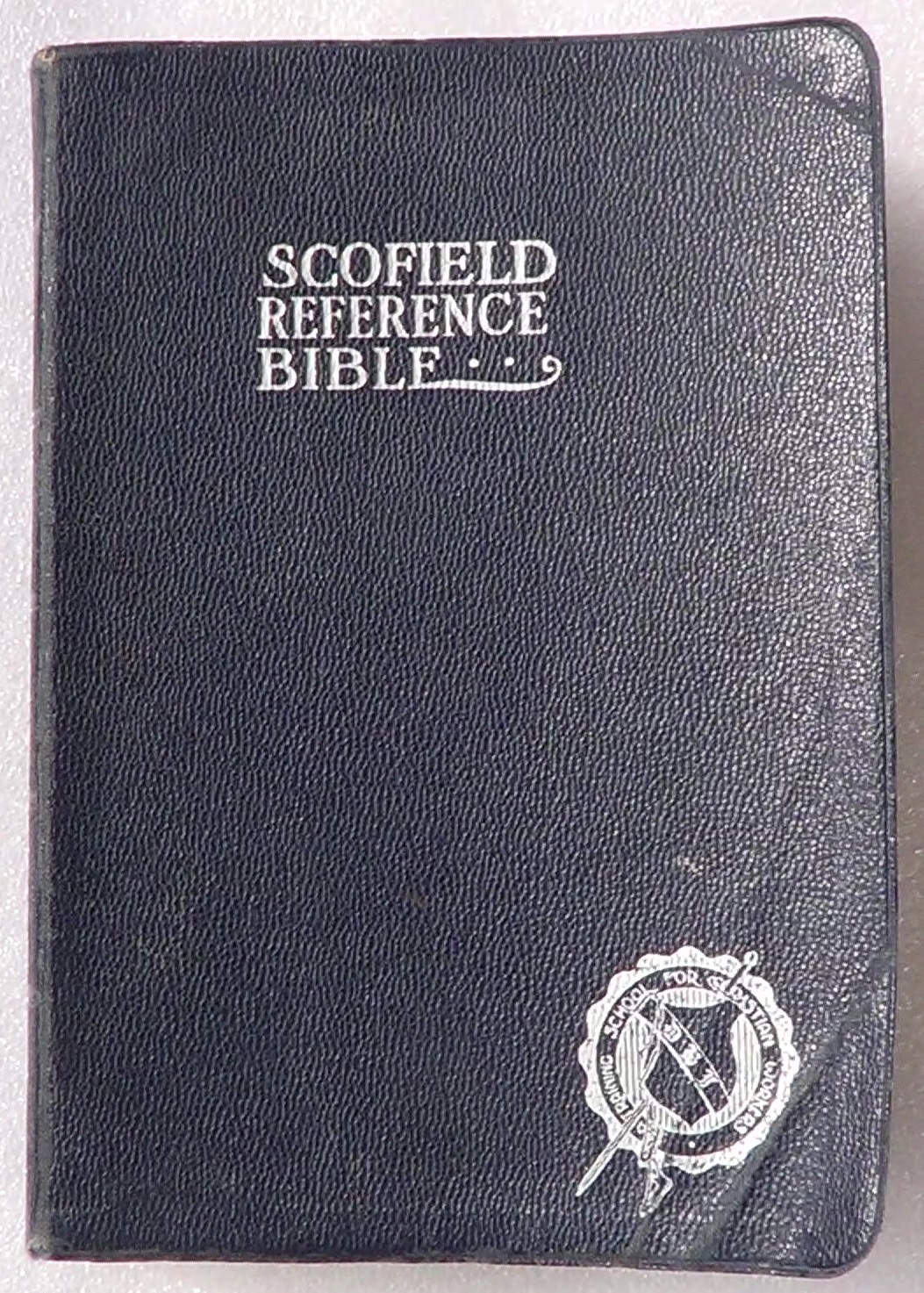
- 1917 edition of the Scofield Bible
- Other names: KJV Scofield Study Bible
- Language: English
- Complete Bible published: 1909
- Online as: Scofield Reference Bible at Wikisource
- Authorship: Cyrus I. Scofield (editor)
- Derived from: King James Version
- Revision: 1917
- Publisher: Oxford University Press
- Religious affiliation: Dispensationalism
- Website: scofieldbible.org
- Genesis 1:1–3 In the beginning God created the heaven and the earth. And the earth was without form, and void; and darkness was upon the face of the deep. And the Spirit of God moved upon the face of the waters. And God said, Let there be light: and there was light. John 3:16 For God so loved the world, that he gave his only begotten Son, that whosoever believeth in him should not perish, but have everlasting life.

The Scofield Reference Bible is a widely circulated study Bible. Edited and annotated by the American Bible student Cyrus I. Scofield, it popularized dispensationalism at the beginning of the 20th century. Published by Oxford University Press and containing the entire text of the traditional Protestant King James Version (KJV), it first appeared in 1909 and was revised by the author in 1917.

== Features ==
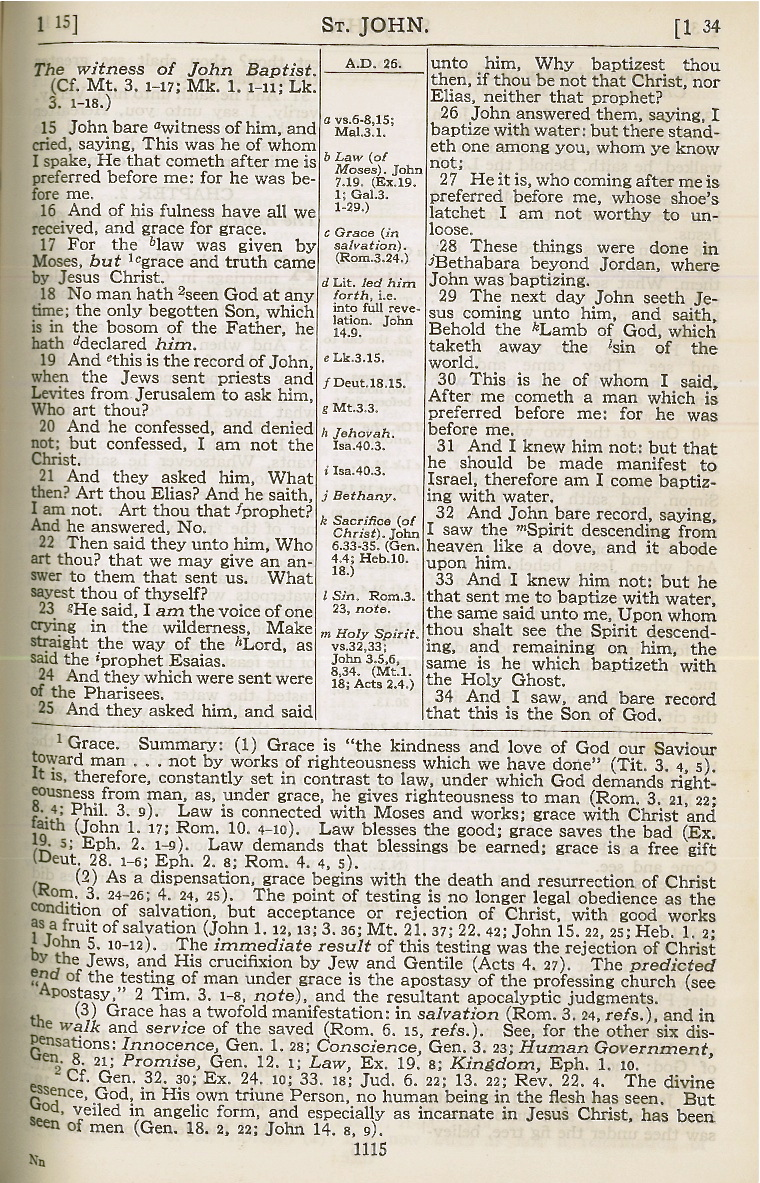
Scofield Reference Bible, page 1115. This page includes Scofield's note on John 1:17.

The Scofield Bible exhibits what amounts to a commentary on the biblical text alongside the Bible instead of in a separate volume, the first to do so in English since the Geneva Bible (1560). It also contains a cross-referencing system that ties together related verses of Scripture and allows a reader to follow biblical themes from one chapter and book to another (so called "chain references"). The 1917 edition also attempts to date events of the Bible. It was in the pages of the Scofield Reference Bible that many Christians first encountered Archbishop James Ussher's calculation of the date of Creation as 4004 BC; and through discussion of Scofield's notes, which advocates the "gap theory," fundamentalists began a serious internal debate about the nature and chronology of creation.

=== Later editions ===
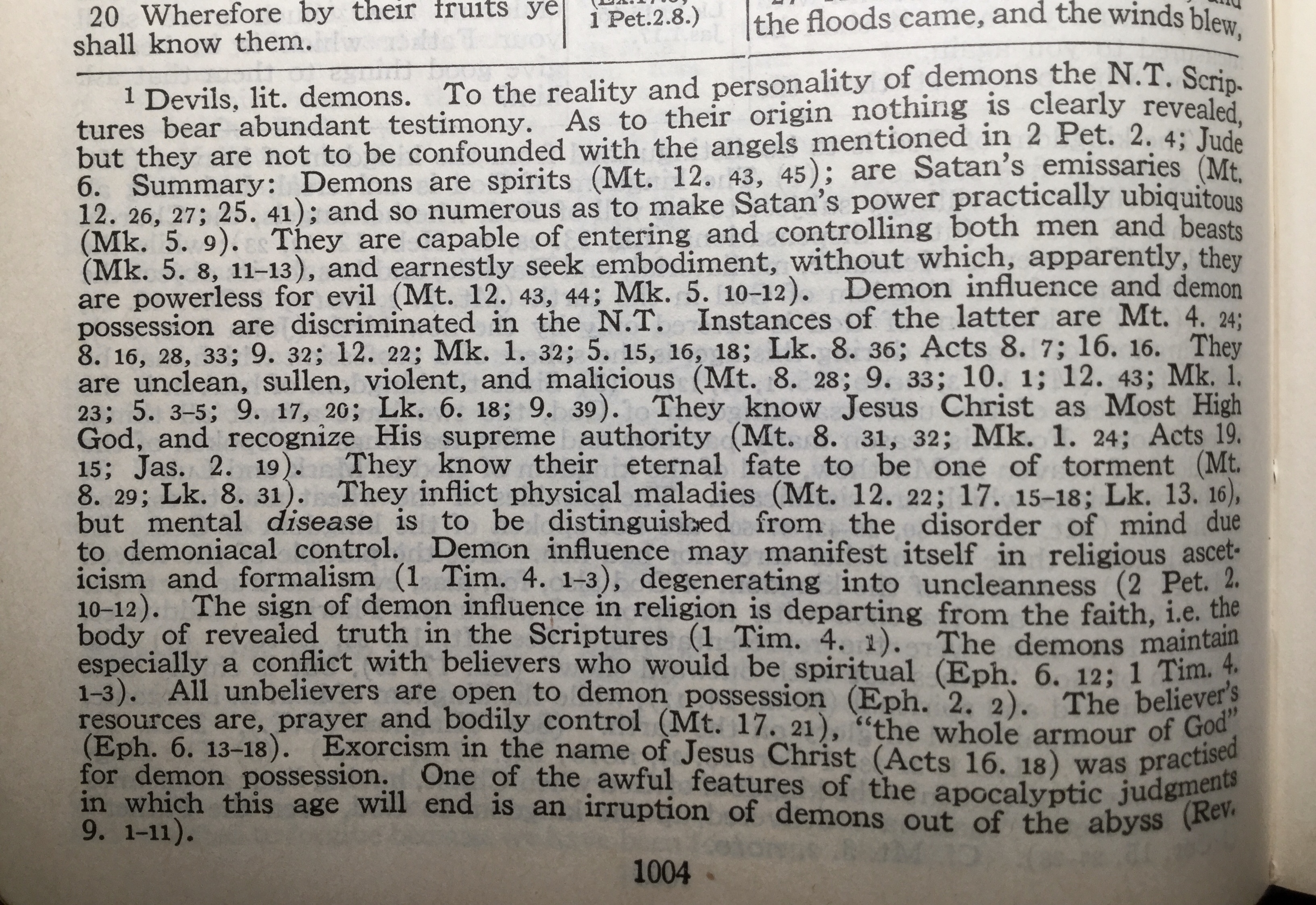
Notes in the 1917 Scofield Bible

The 1917 Scofield Reference Bible notes are now in the public domain, and the 1917 edition is "consistently the best selling edition of the Scofield Bible" in the United Kingdom and Ireland. In 1967, Oxford University Press published a revision of the Scofield Bible. It contained a slightly modernized KJV text, and a muting of some of the tenets of Scofield's theology. Recent editions of the KJV Scofield Study Bible have moved the textual changes made in 1967 to the margin. The Press continues to issue editions under the title Oxford Scofield Study Bible, and there are translations into French, German, Spanish, and Portuguese. For instance, the French edition published by the Geneva Bible Society is printed with a revised version of the Louis Segond translation that includes additional notes by a Francophone committee.

In the 21st century, Oxford University Press published Scofield notes to accompany six additional English translations.

== Criticism ==
Opponents of biblical fundamentalism have criticized the Scofield Bible for its air of total authority in biblical interpretation, for what they consider its glossing over of biblical contradictions and for its focus on eschatology.

== Legacy ==
The first edition of the Scofield Bible was published in 1909. The post-World War II era witnessed the creation of a homeland for Jews in Palestine. Thus, Scofield's premillennialism seemed prophetic. "At the popular level, especially, many people came to regard the dispensationalist scheme as completely vindicated." Sales of the Reference Bible exceeded two million copies by the end of World War II.

The Scofield Reference Bible promotes dispensationalism, the belief that between creation and the final judgement there would be seven distinct eras of God's dealing with man and that these eras are a framework for synthesizing the message of the Bible. Largely through the influence of Scofield's notes, many fundamentalist Christians in the United States adopted a dispensational theology. Scofield's notes on the Book of Revelation are a major source for the various timetables, judgments, and plagues elaborated on by popular religious writers such as Hal Lindsey, Edgar C. Whisenant, and Tim LaHaye; and in part because of the success of the Scofield Reference Bible, 20th-century American fundamentalists placed greater emphasis on eschatological speculation.

The Scofield Bible significantly influenced the Christian Zionist movement. The 1967 revision of the Scofield Bible has been noted for spreading anti-Arab sentiment among the Christian evangelical movement. Referring to Scofield's interpretation of Genesis 12:3 ("I will bless them that bless thee and curse him that curseth thee"), John Hagee, the founder of Christians United for Israel (CUFI), argues "The man or nation that lifts a voice or hand against Israel invites the wrath of God."
