= Dispensationalism =

Biblical interpretation

Dispensationalism is a Christian theological framework for interpreting the Christian Bible which maintains that history is divided into multiple ages called dispensations in which God interacts with his chosen people in different ways. It is often distinguished from covenant theology, the traditional Reformed view of reading the Bible. These are two competing frameworks of biblical theology that attempt to explain overall continuity in the Bible. The coining of the term "dispensationalism" has been attributed to Philip Mauro, a critic of the system's teachings, in his 1928 book The Gospel of the Kingdom.

Dispensationalists use a literal interpretation of the Christian Bible and believe that divine revelation unfolds throughout its narrative. They believe that there is a distinction between Israel and the Church, and that Christians are not bound by the Mosaic Law. They maintain beliefs in premillennialism, Christian Zionism, and a rapture of Christians before the expected Second Coming of Jesus, whom Christians believe to be the Messiah, generally before the Great Tribulation.

Although similar views were held by earlier authors such as Pierre Poiret (1646–1719), dispensationalist theology was primarily systematized and promoted by John Nelson Darby (1800–1882) and the Plymouth Brethren in the mid-19th century. It began its spread in the United States during the late 19th century through the efforts of evangelists such as James Inglis, James Hall Brookes, and Dwight L. Moody, the programs of the Niagara Bible Conference, and the establishment of Bible institutes. With the dawn of the 20th century, C. I. Scofield introduced the Scofield Reference Bible, which crystallized dispensationalism in the United States.

Dispensationalism has become popular within U.S. evangelicalism, Latin American evangelicalism, and in the Faroe Islands, where they form the largest non-Lutheran Christian group in the country. In addition to the Plymouth Brethren, dispensationalism is commonly found in non-denominational Protestant churches such as Bible churches, as well as among Baptist, Pentecostal, and Charismatic groups, with traditional forms of the theology being especially prevalent in churches that uphold Free Grace theology. Protestant denominations that embrace covenant theology, such as the Reformed churches, tend to reject dispensationalism.

== Overview ==
Dispensationalism is a Christian theological framework that views history as divided into distinct periods in which God interacts with mankind in specific ways. Scofield, in his Scofield Reference Bible, defined a dispensation as "a period of time during which man is tested in respect of obedience to some specific revelation of the will of God".

Dispensationalist chart of world history

Charles Ryrie took issue with Scofield's definition as too simple, stating that such a definition opened the system to attack from nondispensationalists. Ryrie separates the term age from dispensation, stating that the two terms are not synonymous in meaning while defining a dispensation as "a distinguishable economy in the outworking of God's purpose". He further suggests that the defining characteristics of a dispensation are the distinct governing relationship in which God interacts with mankind during that period, and the resulting responsibility placed upon mankind in that period.

Evangelical Christians generally agree that there are distinct periods in God's plan for humanity. Dispensationalist theologians tend to hold "a particular view of the parallel-but-separate roles and destinies of Israel and the [Christian] church", with a "careful separation ... between what is addressed to Israel and what is addressed to the church. What is addressed to Israel is 'earthly' in character and is to be interpreted 'literally'."

This view is distinct from covenant theology, which holds that rather than having separate plans, "God has one people, one people of God throughout redemptive history, called 'Israel' under the Old Testament, and called 'the church' under the New."

Philip Mauro, a critic of the system's teachings in his 1928 book The Gospel of the Kingdom, is considered to be the first to coin the term "dispensationalism" to describe the theological framework that had made inroads into fundamentalism, calling it "a subtle form of modernism".

=== Typical divisions ===
The number of dispensations may vary from three to eight, but the typical seven-dispensation scheme is as follows:

- Innocence – Adam under probation prior to the Fall of Man. Ends with expulsion from the Garden of Eden in Genesis 3. Some refer to this period as the Adamic period or the dispensation of the Adamic covenant or Adamic law.
- Conscience – From the Fall to the Great Flood. Ends with the worldwide deluge.
- Human or Civil Government – After the Great Flood, humanity is responsible to enact the death penalty, and has the authority to govern. Ends with the dispersion at the Tower of Babel. Some use the term "Noahide law" in reference to this period of dispensation.
- Promise or Patriarchal Rule – From Abraham to Moses. Ends with the refusal to enter Canaan and the 40 years of unbelief in the wilderness. Some use the terms "Abrahamic law" or "Abrahamic covenant" in reference to this period of dispensation.
- Law – From Moses to the crucifixion of Jesus Christ. Ends with the scattering of Israel in AD 70. Some use the term "Mosaic law" in reference to this period of dispensation.
- Grace – From the cross to the rapture of the church seen by some groups as being described in 1 Thessalonians and the Book of Revelation. The rapture is followed by the wrath of God, constituting the Great Tribulation. Some use the term "Age of Grace" or "the Church Age" for this dispensation.
- Millennial Kingdom – A literal 1000-year reign of Christ on earth (Revelation 20:1–6), centered in Jerusalem, ending with God's judgment on the final rebellion.

Dispensational schemes	Bible chapters							
Dispensational schemes	Genesis 1–3	Genesis 3–8	Genesis 9–11	Genesis 12 – Exodus 19	Exodus 20 – Birth of the Church	Church Age – Rapture	Revelation 20:4–6	Revelation 20–22
7 or 8 step	Innocence or Edenic	Conscience or Antediluvian	Civil Government	Patriarchal or Promise	Mosaic or Law	Grace or Church	Millennial Kingdom	Eternal State or Final
4 step	Patriarchal				Mosaic	Ecclesial	Zionic	
3 step (minimalist)	Law					Grace	Kingdom	

=== Variants ===
- Classic dispensationalism
- Ultradispensationalism (Bullingerism)
- Hyperdispensationalism (Mid-Acts dispensationalism)
- Revised dispensationalism
- Progressive dispensationalism

== Theology ==
=== Purpose of God in the world ===
According to John Walvoord, God's purpose in the world is to manifest his glory. Charles Ryrie writes that dispensational soteriology focuses on man's salvation as the means God uses to glorify himself.

=== Biblical literalism ===
A key element of dispensationalism is its use of the historical-grammatical hermeneutic to obtain a consistent, literal interpretation of the text. In this method, scripture is to be interpreted according to the normal rules of human language in its entirety. This leads dispensationalists to take eschatological passages in the Bible literally. Charles Ryrie suggests that a non-literal hermeneutic is the reason amillennialists apply Old Testament promises made to Israel "spiritually" to the church, and covenant premillennialists see some prophecies as fulfilled and others as not. This approach does not rule out the usage of figures of speech or symbols within the text of the Bible, but it does resist reading passages concerning Israel as spiritualizations rather than as dealing with national Israel.

=== Progressive revelation ===
Progressive revelation is the doctrine that each successive book of the Bible provides further revelation of God and his program. Theologian Charles Hodge wrote that the progressive character of divine revelation is gradually unfolded until the fullness of truth is revealed. Charles Ryrie wrote that the Bible is not viewed as a textbook on theology, but rather as a continually unfolding revelation of God through successive ages where there are distinguishable stages in which God introduces mankind to new responsibilities.

Covenant theology and dispensationalist theology disagree regarding the meaning of revelation. Covenant theology views the New Testament as the key to interpreting the Old Testament. For dispensationalists, the Old Testament is interpreted on its own and the New Testament contains new information which can build on the Old Testament but cannot change its meaning. Each stands alone, rather than the Old Testament being reread through the lens of the New Testament.

=== Distinction between Israel and the Church ===
Dispensationalists see a historic and demographic distinction between Israel and the Church. For them, Israel is an ethnic nation consisting of Hebrews (Israelites), beginning with Abraham. Believing that the Old Testament promises to Israel await fulfillment, dispensationists link biblical Israel to the modern state of Israel, viewing its establishment as fulfillment of biblical prophecies concerning Israel. Christian Zionism has made evangelical Christians some of the most ardent supporters of the State of Israel in American politics.

The Church, on the other hand, consists of all saved individuals from the "birth of the Church" in the book of Acts until the time of the rapture. Classic dispensationalists refer to this period as a "parenthesis", a temporary interlude in the progress of Israel's prophesied history when God has paused his dealing with Israel and is dealing with his Church.

There are differing views within dispensationalism as to when the church age began. Classic dispensationalism considers Pentecost in Acts 2 to be the beginning of the Church as distinct from Israel. Charles Finney wrote in 1839 that Pentecost was "the commencement of a new dispensation", emphasizing the role of the Holy Spirit as a distinction. Cyrus Scofield did not make Pentecost itself the turning point, but did emphasize its role in dividing the dispensations of "Law" and "Grace". In contrast, hyperdispensationalists suggest that the church started later in Acts ("Mid-Acts") with the ministry of Paul, identifying the start of the church as occurring between the salvation of Saul in Acts 9 and the Holy Spirit's commissioning of Paul in Acts 13. E. W. Bullinger and the ultradispensationalists taught that the church began in Acts 28. According to progressive dispensationalism, the distinction between Israel and the Church is not mutually exclusive, as there is a recognized overlap between the two. The overlap includes Jewish Christians, such as James, brother of Jesus, who likely aimed to integrate Jesus's teachings with the Second Temple Judaism practiced in Jerusalem during their historical context. Additionally, there were Christians of Jewish ethnicity, like Peter and Paul the Apostle, who had differing opinions about Jewish and gentile adherence to Mosaic law. Progressive dispensationalism "softens" the Church/Israel distinction by seeing some Old Testament promises as expanded by the New Testament to include the Church without replacing the promises to its original audience, Israel.

Dispensationalists thus do not view passages such as Romans 9:6 as teaching that the Church is the "New Israel", but rather arguing that it creates a distinction within the nation of Israel, distinguishing the whole from the believing remnant within Israel.

=== The Law ===
Dispensationalists believe that Christ abolished the Mosaic law, and thus it does not apply to the Christian. Instead, the Christian is under the Law of Christ, which embodies moral principles from God that are in both codes. In this view, although many commandments of the Old Testament are re-established in the New Testament, only the commandments explicitly affirmed there are to be kept; this excludes the ceremonial and civil aspects of the Mosaic law.

=== Eschatology ===
Dispensationalism teaches an eschatology that is explicitly premillennial, in that it affirms the return of Christ prior to a literal 1,000-year reign of Jesus Christ on earth as the fulfillment of Old Testament prophecies. This millennial kingdom will be theocratic in nature, and not mainly soteriological in the way George Eldon Ladd and others with a non-dispensational form of premillennialism have viewed it. It will be distinctly Jewish, with the throne of David restored.

The majority of dispensationalists profess a pretribulation rapture. Midtribulation and posttribulation rapture are minority views. Pretribulational rapture doctrine is what separates dispensationalism from other forms of premillennialism and other millennial views. In this view, the rapture is viewed as imminent, and thus could happen at any moment, without any necessary preceding signs for it.

Dispensational eschatology was popularized in Hal Lindsey's book, The Late Great Planet Earth (1970). In Lindsey's version, the unfolding of events includes the establishment of modern Israel in 1948, Jews regaining control of Jerusalem's sacred sites in the 1967 Arab-Israeli War, a rebuilding of the Temple which has yet to occur, an Antichrist who will come to power, Christians to be removed from the earth in a rapture of the Church, and seven years of tribulation (Daniel's seventieth week) culminating in a great battle of Armageddon in which Christ will triumph over evil and establish a literal 1,000 year reign of his kingdom on earth. Israel and the Church being distinct in this view, the rapture must remove the Church before remnant Israel can be gathered.

=== The Davidic throne ===
Dispensationalism in its classical form denies that Christ today is reigning in the throne of David, which kingdom however was offered to Israel during the ministry of Christ. This kingdom is viewed as entirely distinct from the universal kingdom of God, which is the general rule of God over the earth. However, unlike classical dispensationalists, progressive dispensationalists affirm nevertheless that the Davidic kingdom is operative today.

== History ==
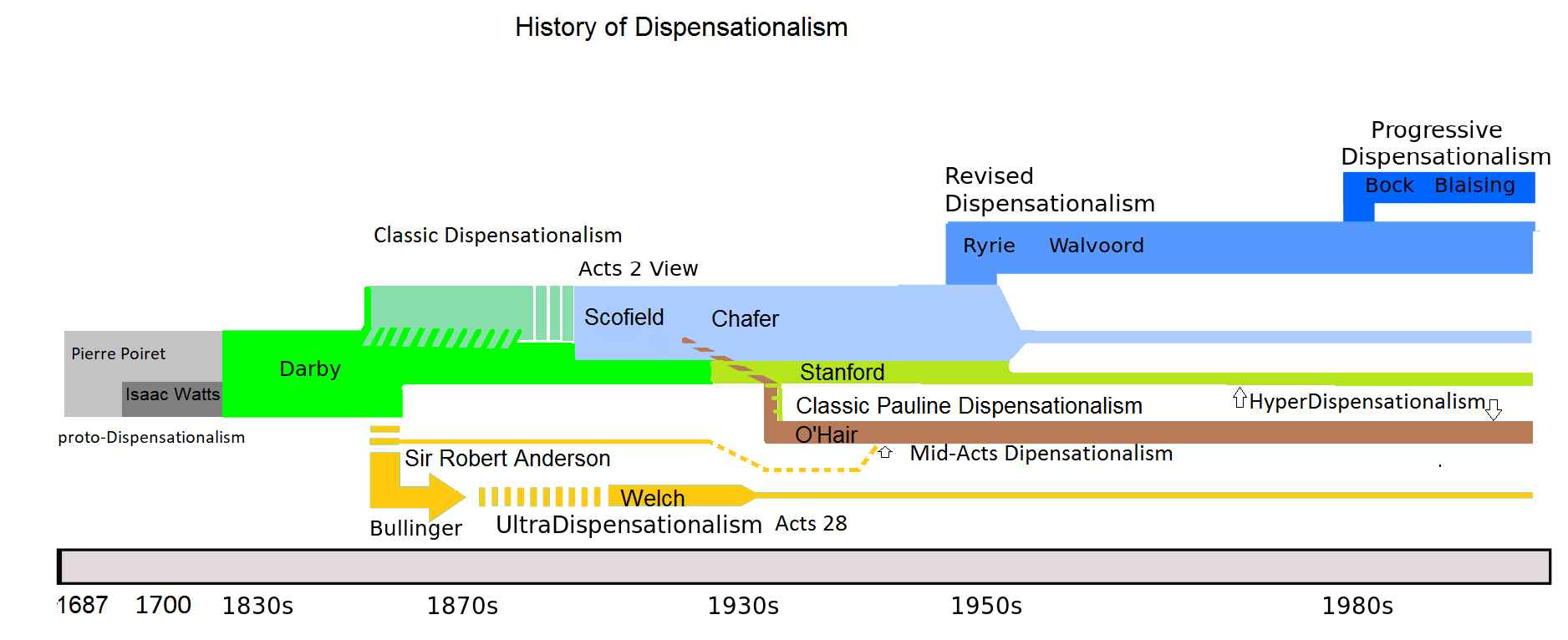
Timeline of the history of dispensationalism, showing the development of various streams of thought

=== Proto-dispensationalism ===
Advocates of dispensationalism have sought to find similar views of dispensations in Church history, referencing theologians or groups such as Francisco Ribera, the Taborites, Joachim of Fiore, Denis the Carthusian and others. Joachim's theory of three stages of human history has been argued to have anticipated the later dispensationalist view of organizing history into different dispensations. Joachim's stages were divided into the "Age of the Father" which was under the Law, the "Age of the Son" which was a period of tribulation, and the "Age of the Spirit" which was a period of bliss on earth.

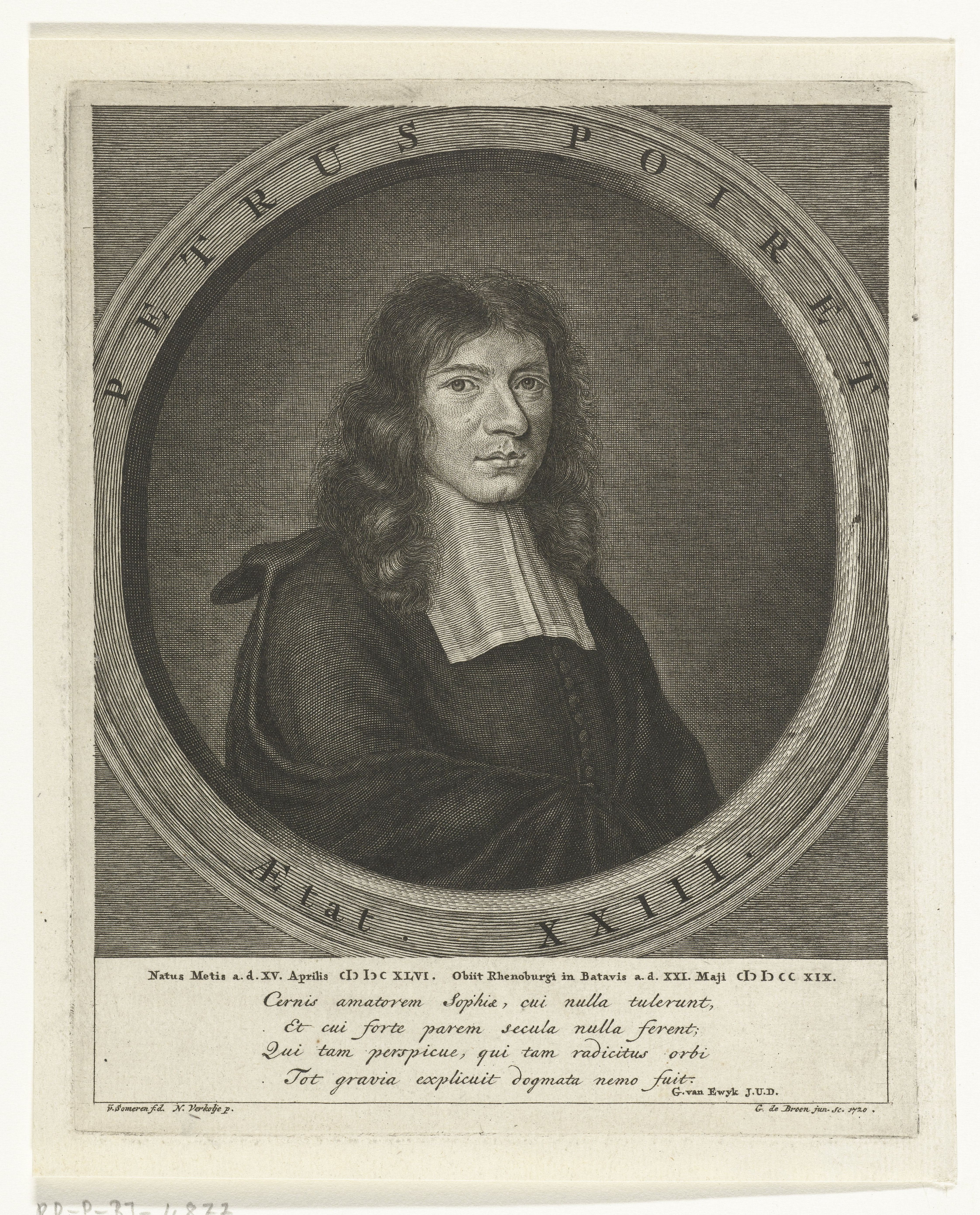
Pierre Poiret is seen as a forerunner of Dispensationalism.

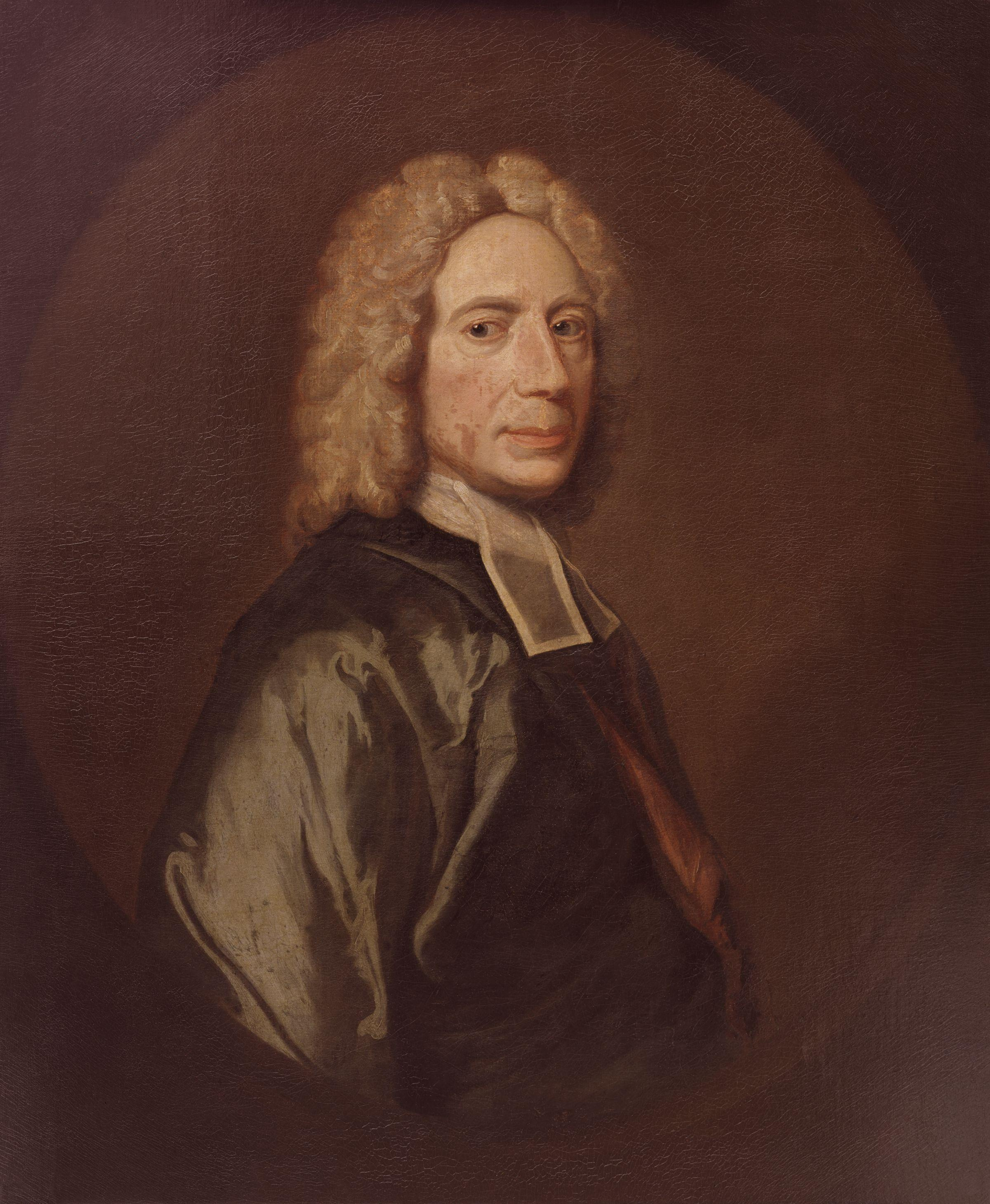
Scofield followed Isaac Watts's (1674–1748) divisions of the dispensations.

Fra Dolcino (c. 1250 – 1307) taught Joachim's theory of the stages of history, and dispensationalists Mark Hitchcock and Thomas Ice have suggested that Dolcino's teaching was of a pretribulational rapture. The relevant teaching was that when Antichrist appears, Dolcino and his followers would be taken away and preserved from Antichrist, and that following the death of Antichrist, Dolcino and his followers would return to Earth to convert those then living to the true faith. However, the source is an anonymous 1316 Latin text titled The History of Brother Dolcino, so it is uncertain whether Dolcino actually taught it.

William C. Watson has argued that multiple 17th century Puritan theologians anticipated dispensational views. In his book Dispensationalism Before Darby (2015), he argues that Ephraim Huit (1595–1644) and John Birchensa (in his book The History of Scripture published in 1660) taught that God has differing plans for Jews and Gentiles. Watson also argues that Nathaniel Holmes (1599–1678) taught a pretribulational rapture.

Christian mystic and philosopher Pierre Poiret (1646–1719) is said by some to have been the first theologian to develop a dispensationalist system, writing a book titled The Divine Economy. Poiret taught that history should be organized into multiple dispensations in which God works with humans in different ways, including the millennium as a future dispensation. Poiret's eschatology includes a belief in two resurrections, the rise of the Antichrist, and the nation of Israel being regathered, restored and converted. Poiret divided history into seven dispensations: early childhood (ended in the Flood), childhood (ended in Moses's ministry), boyhood (ended in Malachi), youth (ended in Christ), manhood (most of the Church era), old age ("human decay", meaning the last hour of the Church), and the restoration of all things (the Millennium, including a literal earthly reign of Christ with Israel restored).

Isaac Watts (1674–1748) presented a dispensational view in The Harmony of All the Religions Which God Ever Prescribed, Containing A Brief Survey of the Several Publick Dispensations of God Toward Man. Charles Ryrie states that Scofield's outline of dispensationalism, with the exception of the millennium, is exactly that of Watts, and not Darby.

Edward Irving (1792–1834) in some ways anticipated dispensationalism. He used a literal approach to prophetic interpretation, he believed in a restoration of Israel as a nation, and he believed there would be a great apostasy and Christ would return to establish a literal earthly kingdom. But he also preached that Christ had a fallen nature, which led to him being defrocked by the Scots Presbyterians.

=== Formalization by Darby ===
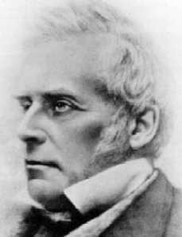
John Nelson Darby systematized and promoted dispensationalism.

Dispensationalism developed as a system from the teachings of John Nelson Darby (1800–1882), considered by many to be the father of dispensationalism. Darby strongly influenced the Plymouth Brethren of the 1830s in Ireland and England. The original concept came when Darby considered the implications of Isaiah 32 for Israel. He concluded that prophecy required a future fulfillment and realization of Israel's kingdom. He saw the New Testament church as a separate program not related to that kingdom. Thus arose a prophetic earthly kingdom program for Israel and a separate "mystery" heavenly program for the church. In order to not conflate the two programs, the prophetic program had to be put on hold to allow for the church to come into existence. Then the church would need to be raptured away before prophecy could resume its earthly program for Israel.

In Darby's conception, dispensations relate exclusively to the divine government of the earth. The Mosaic dispensation continues as a divine administration over Earth up until the return of Christ, and the church, being a heavenly designated assembly, is not associated with any dispensations.

Darby's Brethren ecclesiology failed to catch on in America, but his eschatological doctrine became widely popular, especially among Baptists and Old School Presbyterians.

=== Expansion and growth ===
James Inglis (1813–1872) introduced dispensationalism to North America through the monthly magazine Waymarks in the Wilderness, published intermittently between 1854 and 1872. In 1866, Inglis organized the Believers' Meeting for Bible Study, which introduced dispensationalist ideas to a small but influential circle of American evangelicals. They were disturbed by the growth of religious liberalism and saw premillennialism as an answer. Dispensationalism was introduced as a premillennial position, and it took over the evangelical movement in the course of several decades. The American church denominations rejected Darby's ecclesiology but accepted his eschatology. Many of these churches were Baptist and Old School Presbyterian; they retained Darby's Calvinistic soteriology.

After Inglis's death, James H. Brookes (1830–1898), pastor of Walnut Street Presbyterian Church in St. Louis, Missouri, organized the Niagara Bible Conference (1876–1897) to continue dissemination of dispensationalist ideas. Brookes was well known within millenarian circles, both as a prominent speaker at the Believers' Meeting for Bible Study conferences and for having written articles published in Inglis's Waymarks in the Wilderness.

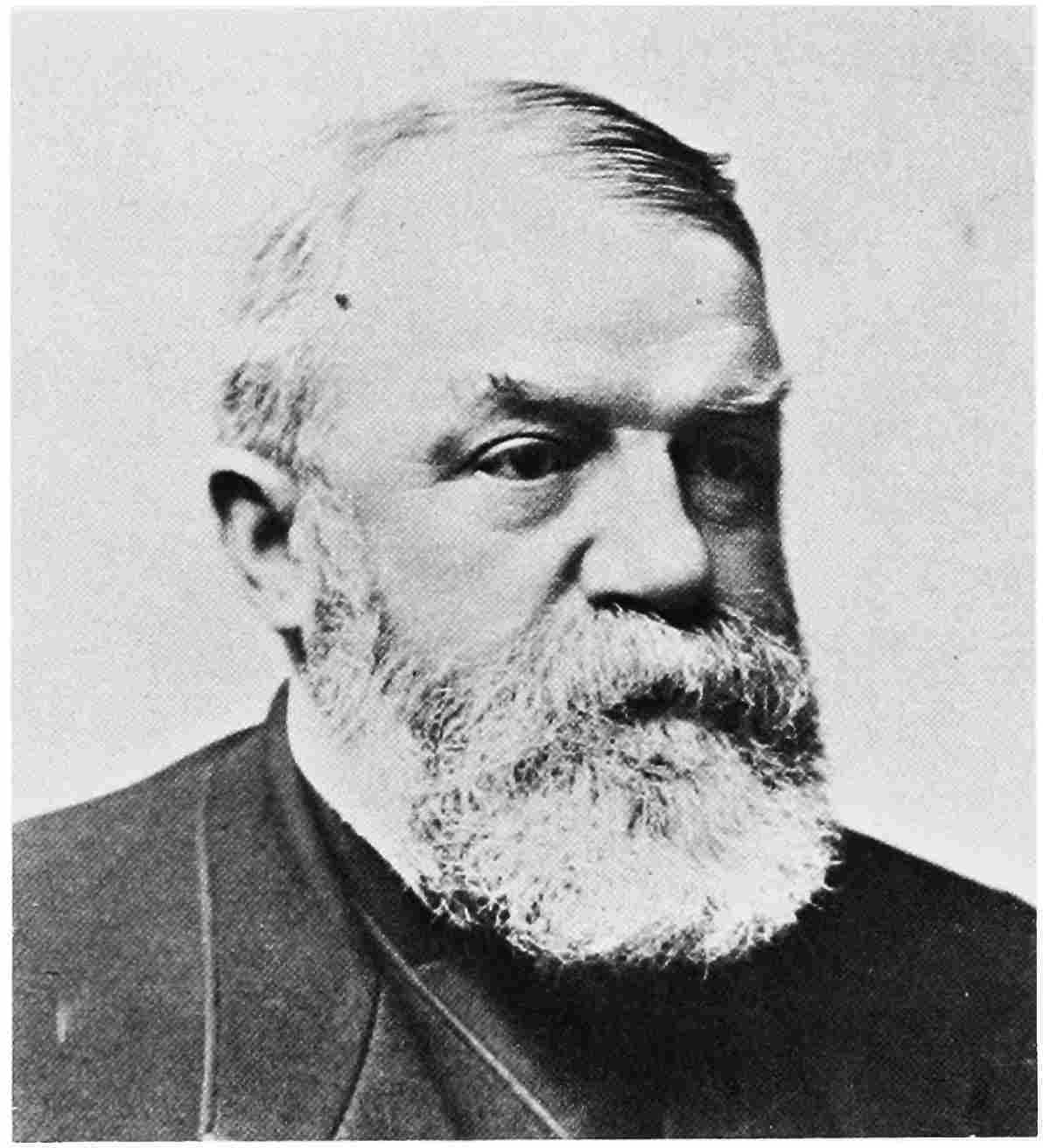
D. L. Moody

Brethren theologian C. H. Mackintosh (1820–1896) had a profound influence on American evangelist Dwight L. Moody (1837–1899), who reached very large audiences with his powerful preaching in the latter half of the 19th century. Moody worked with Brookes and other dispensationalists, and encouraged the spread of dispensationalism. It was during this time that dispensational doctrine became widely accepted among American evangelicals. It also marked a shift in dispensational theology under evangelists like Moody, from Darby's Calvinism and doctrinal rigor to a non-Calvinist view of human freedom in personal salvation.

Other prominent dispensationalists in this period include Reuben Archer Torrey (1856–1928), James M. Gray (1851–1925), William J. Erdman (1833–1923), A. C. Dixon (1854–1925), A. J. Gordon (1836–1895), and William Eugene Blackstone (1841–1935). These men were active evangelists who promoted a host of Bible conferences and other missionary and evangelistic efforts. They also gave the dispensationalist philosophy institutional permanence by assuming leadership of new independent Bible institutes, such as the Moody Bible Institute in 1886, the Bible Institute of Los Angeles (now Biola University) in 1908, and Philadelphia College of Bible (now Cairn University, formerly Philadelphia Biblical University) in 1913. The network of related institutes that soon developed became the nucleus for the spread of American dispensationalism. When the Bible Institute of the Chicago Evangelization Society (now Moody Bible Institute) formally opened in 1889, Torrey served as its first superintendent.

Revivalist evangelicals such as Moody and Torrey did not believe the gift of tongues continued past the Apostolic age, but their emphasis on the baptism of the Holy Spirit merged well with holiness ideas. This encouraged the spread of dispensationalism within the Pentecostal movement.

During this time, Anglican clergyman E. W. Bullinger (1837–1913) began teaching what became known as "ultradispensationalism" or "Bullingerism". Bullinger taught that the Church did not begin until Acts 28, that the Lord's Supper and water baptism were for Jewish believers, and that Paul's epistles were written to the Jews.

=== Scofield and his influence ===
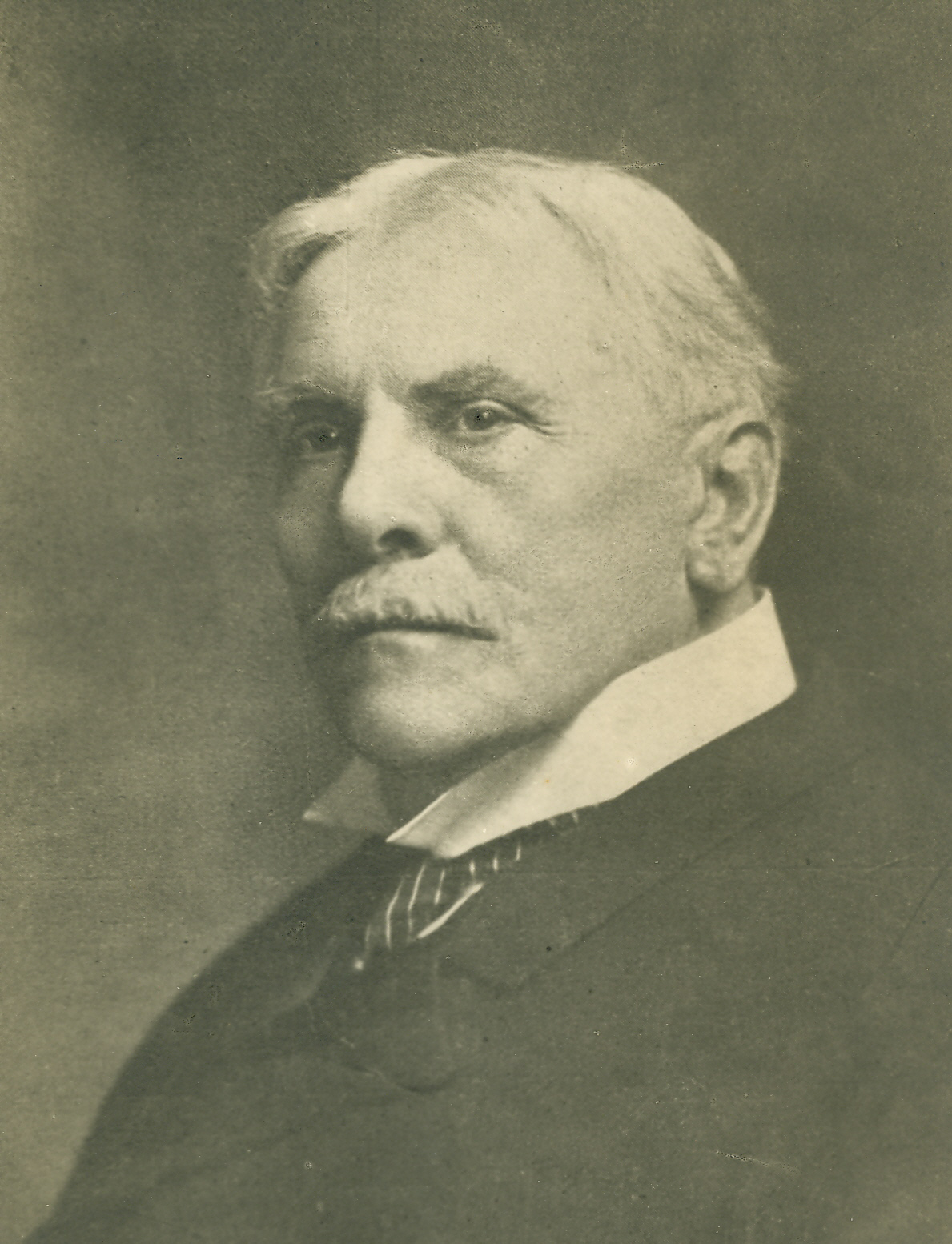
Cyrus Scofield

A disciple of James Brookes, Cyrus Scofield (1843–1921), began attending the Niagara conferences and became an advocate of premillennialism, specifically pre-tribulationism. After several years of work, Scofield introduced dispensationalism to a wider audience in America through his Scofield Reference Bible. Published in 1909 by the Oxford University Press, the Scofield Reference Bible was the first Bible to display overtly dispensationalist notes on the same pages as the biblical text. Use of the Scofield Bible became popular among independent Evangelicals in the United States. Its premillennialism led to a pessimistic social view within evangelicalism, to "not polish the brass rails on the sinking social ship", so that evangelism came to be focused on saving the lost rather than expanding Christendom.

The Scofield Reference Bible came out at the peak of Bullinger's influence. Scofield's Bible confronted some of the ultradispensationalists' (Bullingerites') positions, including their divisions of dispensational time. As the Scofield Bible became popular among dispensationalists, it marginalized the hyperdispensationalist position in the United States.

Influenced by Scofield, evangelist and Bible teacher Lewis Sperry Chafer (1871–1952) and his brother Rollin Chafer founded Evangelical Theological College in 1924. The school would eventually become Dallas Theological Seminary, the main dispensationalist institution in America.

The Baptist Bible Seminary now located in Clarks Summit, Pennsylvania, became another dispensationalist school.

=== The Fundamentals ===
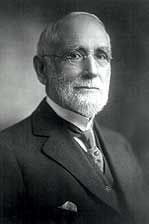
Lyman Stewart, co-founder of Union Oil

In the 1910s, another publication took hold within American evangelicalism. Known as The Fundamentals, its twelve volumes were published in quarterly installments between 1910 and 1915 by the Testimony Publishing Company. Funded by Union Oil co-founder Lyman Stewart (1840–1923) and managed by an executive committee of dispensationalists that included Clarence Dixon and Reuben Torrey, The Fundamentals helped solidify dispensationalist views within American Christian fundamentalism and the evangelical movement.

The Scopes trial in 1925 served to unify fundamentalists, but the movement began to decline soon after the trial. Scopes trial prosecutor and public face of the fundamentalist movement William Jennings Bryan died a week after the verdict, and journalist H. L. Mencken portrayed supporters of that anti-evolution verdict as uneducated and ignorant. The fundamentalist movement began to decentralize after it lost Bryan. Dispensationalism's fate was tied to that breakdown.

In 1928, Philip Mauro, seeking to re-invigorate the fundamentalist movement, pointed a finger at dispensationalism and in the process coined the term. Singling it out as the source of division within the larger fundamentalist movement, he wrote that the dispensationalist view was more recent than Darwinism and it eroded fundamental truths of scripture.

In 1934, Evangelical Theological College acquired the venerable theological journal Bibliotheca Sacra (first published in 1844). Lewis Chafer's first public declaration that he was a dispensationalist appeared in that journal's pages. In 1936, he published a 60-page response to criticism from Mauro and other fundamentalists, entitled "Dispensationalism". That same year, Chafer renamed his school Dallas Theological Seminary.

The conflict between dispensationalists and covenantalists continued through the 1930s and 1940s, leading to permanent divisions that shaped the fundamentalist movement.

=== Influence of Dallas Theological Seminary ===
By the mid 20th century, evangelicals such as Charles Feinberg, J. Dwight Pentecost, Herman Hoyt, Charles Ryrie, and John Walvoord were promoting dispensationalism. All five of these men either studied or taught at Dallas Theological Seminary (DTS). Pentecost taught there for more than 60 years, and published an influential work on dispensational eschatology, Things to Come (1956). A decade later, Ryrie published Dispensationalism Today (1965), which has become the primary introduction to dispensational theology.

Furthering the rift with covenant theology, Ryrie wrote in Bibliotheca Sacra in 1957 that dispensationalism is "the only valid system of Biblical interpretation". In 1959, Walvoord stated that no non-dispensationalists (including Catholics and mainline Protestants) offered any defense against modernism, and that they were all under the influence of hermeneutical and theological errors.

Dallas Theological Seminary's influence grew as other schools and seminaries hired its graduates as faculty. In 1970, DTS graduate Hal Lindsey published The Late Great Planet Earth, which launched dispensationalist eschatology into pop culture. His book sold 10 million copies and made rapture and the tribulation household words.

=== Pop prophecy ===
The commercial success of The Late Great Planet Earth triggered a flood of books that featured dispensationalism's rapture theology. Lindsey published Satan is Alive and Well on Planet Earth (1972), There's a New World Coming (1973), and The Liberation of Planet Earth (1974). Other books included The Beginning of the End (1972) by Tim LaHaye, and DTS graduate Thomas McCall's Satan in the Sanctuary (1973) and Raptured (1975). In 1972, Iowa filmmakers Russell Doughten and Donald W. Thompson released A Thief in the Night, a fictional film about the aftermath of the rapture that has been seen by an estimated 300 million people. Televangelist Jack Van Impe covered current events in light of Bible prophecy with a dispensational premillennialist spin.

=== Emergence of the Christian Right ===
The late 20th century marked a shift from the separatism practiced earlier in the century to more political engagement. This era saw emergence of the Christian Right, rooted in the dispensational theology that places Israel at the center of God's purpose in the world.

In 1978, dispensationalist television evangelist Jerry Falwell began making trips to Israel that were sponsored by the Israeli government. He became the first major American political figure to insist that the U.S. must support Israel for the fate of the nation. Falwell listed Feinberg, Pentecost, Hoyt, and Walvoord as his most important influences. Falwell and Tim LaHaye founded the Moral Majority in 1979, with its objective to get people saved, baptized, and registered to vote. The Moral Majority also provided a platform for political activism. LaHaye, a lifelong fundamentalist and dispensationalist, became a prominent figure in the Christian Right. He served as head of the Moral Majority for a time, and in the mid-eighties he created the American Coalition for Traditional Values. In 1987, he served as co-chairman of Republican Jack Kemp's presidential campaign, until it was reported that he had called Catholicism "a false religion".

Influenced by dispensational premillennialism, the Moral Majority lobbied for pro-Israel U.S. foreign policy positions, including protection of the Jewish people in Israel and continuing U.S. aid to the state of Israel. Opposed to Jimmy Carter's affirmation of a Palestinian homeland, the Moral Majority endorsed Ronald Reagan for president in 1980. In Reagan, they found a candidate who shared their apocalypticism. Reagan had read Hal Lindsey's The Late Great Planet Earth, and it has been suggested that this eschatological view drove his Middle East policies. In an interview with televangelist Jim Bakker, Reagan said "[w]e may be the generation that sees Armageddon." Dispensational theology affected more than the Reagan administration's Middle East foreign policy. James G. Watt, a member of the Assemblies of God and Reagan's first Secretary of the Interior, told Congress that preservation of the environment was made irrelevant by the imminent return of Christ.

In 1980, Hal Lindsey wrote a follow-up to his book The Late Great Planet Earth. Lindsey had not previously drawn a connection from a Christian's personal obligations to a responsibility for social change, but this changed with his new book, The 1980s: Countdown to Armageddon. He began encouraging his readers to elect moral leaders who would reflect that morality within government, an agenda closely aligned with Ronald Reagan's administration.

=== The megachurch movement ===
The growth of suburbs through the 1960s led to the megachurch movement that began in the 1970s. DTS-trained pastors pioneered the movement, including Chuck Swindoll, Erwin Lutzer, David Jeremiah, Robert Jeffress, Tony Evans, and Andy Stanley. Other megachurches, such as John Hagee's Cornerstone Church in San Antonio, Texas, blended teachings of dispensationalism with the prosperity gospel and New Christian Right activism. Hagee's Christians United for Israel included six Pentecostal megachurch pastors and an executive from the Christian Broadcasting Network, including Jerry Falwell. This group became an example of how megachurch dispensationalism was able to find national influence in US politics and diplomacy.

Despite success through growing megachurches, the movement revealed limits when leaders of two of the United States' largest megachurches, Bill Hybels and Rick Warren, disassociated from the theology of dispensationalism. The revival of reformed theology in the emergence of New Calvinism began in the 1980s. Led by pastors such as John Piper, Tim Keller, Mark Driscoll, Matt Chandler, and Albert Mohler, this spawned a megachurch movement of its own, whose leaders became outspoken critics of dispensationalism.

=== Peak and decline ===
By the 1990s, a younger generation of academics emerged as "progressive dispensationalists", opening a rift within the united front Ryrie had pushed for in Dispensationalism Today (1965). Leaders in this school of thought were Craig A. Blaising, Darrell Bock, Kenneth Barker, and Robert L. Saucy.

Dispensationalism's influence within the New Christian Right grew stronger in the 1990s. Building on the success of Hal Lindsey's The Late Great Planet Earth, the 1995 novel Left Behind pushed pop prophecy to further commercial success. Conceived by Tim LaHaye and written by Jerry B. Jenkins, the book spawned a multimedia franchise of 16 books, plus multiple movies, video games, and other spinoff works. The series brought dispensational premillennialism and its "rapture culture" into plain view.

As with Reagan in the 1980s, the New Christian Right helped elect another 'born again' president, George W. Bush. Like Reagan, Bush spoke in terms of prophecies being fulfilled in a way that had meaning to dispensationalists. He referred to Gog and Magog in the war on terror, and said the confrontation was "willed by God, who wants to use this conflict to erase His people's enemies".

Dispensational ideas were experiencing political and commercial success, but Hal Lindsey and Tim LaHaye, who had become the public standard-bearers of dispensationalism, were different from their academic predecessors John Walvoord, Dwight Pentecost, and Charles Ryrie. By the 2010s, support for dispensational theology had peaked in academia and was largely in decline within academic settings. A 2009 survey of Southern Baptist seminaries showed that the majority view was covenantal, and flagship Southern Baptist Theological Seminary had no dispensationalists on its faculty.

Although dispensationalism had collapsed in academic areas, its cultural influence remained. Dispensationalist ideas have persisted in popular culture. A 2004 Newsweek poll indicated that 55 percent of Americans believe Christians will be taken up in the rapture. By the turn of the 21st century, the term dispensationalism had become synonymous with "sectarian fundamentalism", and had come to be more of a political identity than a theological doctrine.

Dispensationalism, however, remains strong within theological circles which espouse Free Grace theology. The majority of those associated with the Free Grace Alliance support dispensationalism and it is taught by the Grace Evangelical Society.

== Criticism ==
The term dispensationalism originated with Philip Mauro. His critique of the system is found in his 1928 book The Gospel of the Kingdom, in which he wrote that "evangelical Christianity must purge itself of this leaven of dispensationalism". He used the term to group the new premillennialism, the idea of dispensational time, and the Israel–Church distinction into a single bundled idea.

Protestant denominations and movements that embrace covenant theology tend to reject dispensationalism. For example, Presbyterian minister John Wick Bowman has called the Scofield Bible "the most dangerous heresy currently to be found within Christian circles". Dispensational theology ultimately led the Presbyterian Church of America (later the Orthodox Presbyterian Church) to split from Bible Presbyterian Synod, which taught dispensationalism. The Churches of Christ became divided in the 1930s as Robert Henry Boll (who taught a variant of dispensationalism) and Foy E. Wallace (representing the amillennial position) disputed severely over eschatology.

=== Soteriology ===
Some dispensationalist Christian Zionists, such as John Hagee, reject the need for Christians to pursue the conversion of the Jews to Christianity. Presupposing a difference between law and grace leads to the idea that there are multiple forms of salvation.

In what is known as the Lordship salvation controversy, there are criticisms of a lack of understanding what was necessary to be "born again". John MacArthur called the problem "easy-believism", in which the basis of salvation is that one merely needs to claim to follow Jesus. MacArthur identified Dallas Theological Seminary founder Lewis Sperry Chafer as the source of the Free Grace theology. Defense of the dispensational position was led primarily by Charles Ryrie and Zane Hodges.

=== Eschatology ===
The pessimism of premillennial eschatology led dispensationalists to see social reform as wasted effort, so that they focused on converting the lost, with no effort toward the kingdom-building social reform of postmillennialism.

=== Political influence ===
In American Theocracy (2006), political commentator Kevin Phillips wrote that dispensationalists and other fundamentalist Christians, together with the oil lobby, provided political support for the U.S. invasion of Iraq in 2003. He wrote that most theologians acknowledge there is no specific sequence of end-times events in the Bible, and that such a belief is the result of a century of "amplified Darbyism". He quoted theologian Barbara Rossing that such hyper-literalism is a "dangerous and false view".

== See also ==
- Christian eschatology
- Millennial Day Theory
- New Covenant theology
- Supersessionism
- Young Earth creationism
