= James Hall Brookes =

American minister (1830–1897)

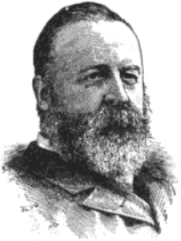
- Born: February 27, 1830; Pulaski, Tennessee
- Died: April 18, 1897 (aged 67); St. Louis, Missouri
- Education: Miami University
- Occupations: Clergyman, writer
- Spouse: Susan Ann Oliver (m. 1854)
- Children: 5

James Hall Brookes (February 27, 1830 – April 18, 1897) was an American Presbyterian pastor, Christian leader and author. Brookes led congregations in Ohio and Missouri during a career spanning 43 years. He became a leader among his peers in the Niagara Bible Conference which led to editing The Truth: or, Testimony for Christ, a periodical. His legacy is also found in the many books, booklets and tracts he produced.

== Early life and education ==
Brookes was born in Pulaski, Tennessee, February 27, 1830, into a family descending on both sides from clergymen. When he was very young, his father, also a Presbyterian minister, died. Brookes made his way to Miami University in Oxford, Ohio, where he graduated in 1853. He had brief studies at the Princeton Theological Seminary where he refused financial assistance. When he "was compelled to stop his theological studies on account of lack of means," he returned to Ohio. After becoming established in Saint Louis, he received the honorary Doctor of Divinity in 1864 from both the University of Missouri and Westminster College.

== Ministry and leadership ==
Soon after returning to Ohio, on April 20, 1854, James Hall Brookes was ordained and installed as the pastor of the First Presbyterian Church in Dayton. Soon he received a call to the Second Presbyterian Church in St. Louis, preaching there for the first time on February 18, 1858. A new congregation was "colonized" in 1864 by members from Second Presbyterian to a location at Walnut & 16th Streets where a new edifice was built. Brookes became the pastor of the resulting Walnut Street Presbyterian Church. This congregation relocated in 1879 to a new church building at the corner of Washington and Compton streets, becoming the Washington and Compton Presbyterian Church, where Brookes remained until his death on Easter Sunday, April 18, 1897.

Brookes had a deep knowledge of the Bible's original languages, an excellent memory, and continually read and studied the Bible. He believed the Bible to be perfect, inerrant, and therefore infallible and immutable. This remarkable knowledge was coupled with his ability to communicate in a highly effective manner. Benjamin B. Warfield, then professor of theology at Princeton Seminary, wrote of Brookes: "Large in figure, commanding in carriage, fluent and forceful in speech, fired with intense convictions, infused with emotion, whether in pulpit or on platform his oratory not only caught the attention but dominated the feelings and controlled the convictions of his audience ... [He had] the voice of a lion and the vehemence of an Elijah ... His was no anæmic Christianity."

== Dispensationalist and premillennialist ==
Brookes was a premillennialist, believing that nowhere in the New Testament is there "so much as a hint of the millennium . . . preceding the personal [Second] coming of Christ." During this thousand year period, Christ will reign and "Israel will see the fulfillment of its covenants that were unconditionally promised in the Old Testament." The millennium will follow the "resurrection and rapture" of believers and a period of "culminating wickedness" before Christ returns with his church to reign over the earth.

James Hall Brookes was considered a "founding father" of dispensationalism in the United States along with men like Dwight L. Moody, Adoniram Judson Gordon, C. I. Scofield, William Eugene Blackstone, and Arno C. Gaebelein. In the foreword to the Dictionary of Premillennial Theology, Mal Couch writes "Not all premillennialists are dispensationalists, but all dispensationalists are premillennialists." Among their beliefs, dispensationalists hold that the Bible is inerrant, verbally inspired, and must be consistently interpreted with a normal literal-grammatical-historical hermeneutic, views that were foundational for Brookes.

Brookes led the Niagara Bible Conference for many years which "helped to spread dispensationalism across America." Premillennial and dispensational beliefs became incorporated in the 1878 confession of faith (Niagara Creed) that was largely written by Brookes and adopted by the Niagara Bible Conference.

== Writings ==
Brookes was a prolific author, writing more than 200 books, booklets, tracts and journal articles. He was a well-known Bible teacher and the editor of The Truth or Testimony for Christ, a periodical which served, along with the journal Watchword, as the official organ of the premillennial movement until his death in 1897. Many of Brookes's writings are available digitally and as reprints. Following is a sample.

- An Outline of the Books of the Bible (n.d.)
- Bible Reading on the Second Coming of Christ (n.d.)
- Chaff and Wheat. A defense of verbal inspiration (1891)
- Did Jesus Rise? A book written to aid honest skeptics (n.d.)
- From Death Unto Life; or, The Sinner Saved (n.d.)
- God Spake All These Words (1895)
- Gospel Hymns (1871)
- He Is Not Here: the Resurrection of Christ (1896)
- How to be Saved: or, The sinner directed to the Saviour (1864)
- "I Am Coming" (1895)
- In Memoriam: Hamilton Rowan Gamble, Governor of Missouri (1864)
- Is the Bible Inspired? (n.d.)
- Is the Bible True? (1877)
- Israel and the Church, the terms distinguished as found in the word of God (n.d.)
- Life through the Living One (1891)
- May Christians Dance? (1869)
- Maranatha: or The Lord Commeth (1889)
- Present Truth: being the testimony of the Holy Ghost on the second coming of the Lord, the divinity of Christ and the personality of the Holy Ghost (1877)
- The Bible Under Fire
- The Christ (1893)
- The Holy Spirit (n.d.)
- The Mystery of Suffering (1890)
- The Way Made Plain (n.d.)
- Till he Come (1891)

== Family ==
In 1854, after returning from his brief study at Princeton Theological Seminary and accepting the call to ministry at First Presbyterian Church of Dayton, Ohio, Brookes married Susan Ann Oliver. They had five daughters. Etta Oliver Brookes lived from 1856 to 1872. Susan Mary Brookes (1861–1936) married Selden P. Spencer, who became a U.S. Senator. Sarah Lacy Brookes (1864–1886) married Ethelbert Dudley Warfield, who became president of Miami University. Judith Bertha Brookes (1866–1905) married Harry French Knight, a St. Louis financier. Olive J. Brookes (1872–1930) married David Riddle Williams who authored the 1897 James H. Brookes: A Memoir. Olive's second husband was Rev. Harris H. Gregg. Brookes died in 1897 on Easter Sunday; his wife, Susan, died in 1910. Brookes and his wife, along with all of their children except Judith, are buried at Bellefontaine Cemetery, Saint Louis, Missouri.

== Brookes Bible College ==
The Saint Louis Bible Training School for Lay Workers was established in Saint Louis in 1909. Subsequently, the school was renamed in honor of Brookes. It was known as Brookes Bible Institute for many years. Following its accreditation, the name was changed to Brookes Bible College. The college continues to operate today in St. Louis, Missouri.
