= Philip Mauro =

American lawyer and Christian author

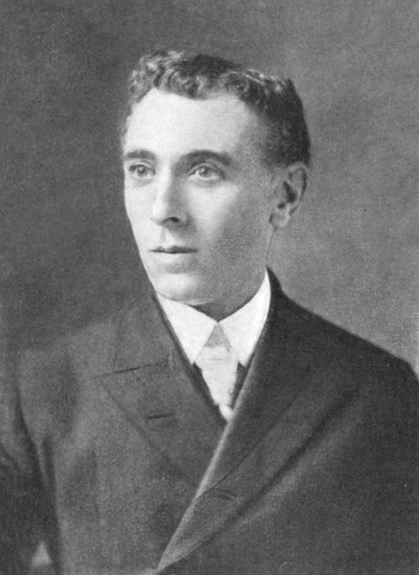
- Born: January 7, 1859; St. Louis, Missouri, US
- Died: April 7, 1952 (aged 93); Staunton, Virginia, US
- Education: Washington University in St. Louis

Philip Mauro (January 7, 1859 – April 7, 1952) was an American lawyer and author.

== Biography ==
Mauro was born in St. Louis, Missouri. He was a lawyer who practiced before the Supreme Court, a patent attorney, and a Christian writer who prepared briefs for the Scopes Trial.

His works include God's Pilgrims, Life in the Word, The Church, The Churches and the Kingdom, The Hope of Israel, Ruth, The Satisfied Stranger, The Wonders of Bible Chronology, The World and its God, The Last Call to the Godly Remnant, More Than a Prophet, Dispensationalism Justifies the Crucifixion, Evolution at the Bar and Of Things Which Soon Must Come to Pass.

Mauro was a creationist and authored an anti-evolution book entitled Evolution at the Bar (1922).

In his 1921 work, The Seventy Weeks: And the Great Tribulation, Mauro argued that Herod the Great was the "wilful king" of Daniel 11:36.

Mauro was a dispensationalist and first coined the term "dispensationalism", however, in his 1928 book The Gospel of the Kingdom, he criticized dispensational theology.

He married Emily Johnston Rockwood in 1882 and had two daughters, Margaret Frances Mauro (1882–1948) and Isabel Rockwood Mauro (later Mrs. Charles Stratton French). Together with his daughter Margaret, Mauro was a passenger on the British ocean liner RMS Carpathia when it rescued the passengers of the Titanic in April 1912.

Philip Mauro died in Staunton, Virginia on April 7, 1952, and was buried at Masonic Cemetery in Culpeper.
