= Rolf Forsberg =

American dramatist

- Born: July 12, 1925; Chicago, Illinois, U.S.
- Died: February 16, 2017 (aged 91)
- Occupations: Producer, Director, Writer, Playwright

Rolf Forsberg (July 12, 1925 – February 16, 2017) was an American playwright, film and theater director.

== Biography ==
Forsberg and his wife, Josephine Forsberg, were founding members of the highly influential Playwrights Theatre Club in Chicago's Hyde Park. Forsberg is known for directing films such as The Late Great Planet Earth and Parable, a film produced for the 1964 New York World's Fair.

Parable portrayed humanity as a traveling circus and Jesus Christ as a circus clown. This marked a new depiction of Christ and inspired the musical Godspell. Parable went on to be honored at Cannes, the Edinburgh Film Festival and Venice Film Festival.

On June 8, 2013, the UCLA Film and Television Archive offered a retrospective of the works of Rolf Forsberg titled The Outre World of Rolf Forsberg. He died in February 2017 at the age of 92.

== Filmography ==
- Sacagawea – on PBS, (2003)
- Tecumseh – History Channel (1997)
- Seven Signs of Christ's Return (2002)
- Where Jesus Walked – starring Barbara Harris (1995)
- Touring Civil War Battlefields (1992)
- Seven Wonders of the Ancient World – narrated by Pierce Brosnan (1990)
- Beyond The Next Mountain – starring Saeed Jaffery and Barry Foster (1987)
- The Late Great Planet Earth – starring Orson Welles (1979)
- Mother Tiger Mother Tiger (1976)
- Peace Child (1974)
- Nail (1974)
- And There Was Morning (1973)
- One Friday (1973)
- King of the Hill (1972)
- Ark (1970)
- Stalked – starring Jack Hawkins(1968)
- Awareness (1968)
- Antkeeper – narrated by Fred Gwynne (1966)
- Parable (1964)
- Light Time for PBS (1960)

== Stage-ography ==
- A Tenth of an Inch Makes The Difference – performer's Arena, Chicago (1984)
- Revival – Pasadena Playhouse Studio (1973)
- The Dybbuk Between Two Worlds – Court Theatre (Chicago) (1962)
- A Tenth of an Inch makes the Difference – New York (1961)
- The Tempest- off-Broadway (1959)
- The Tempest – San Francisco Shakespeare Festival (1958)
- Oedipus Rex – Court Theatre (Chicago) (1960)
- Round Dance – Playwrights, Chicago (1955)
- Shakuntala – Playwrights, Chicago (1954)
- The Trojan Women by Euripides – Court Theatre (Chicago) (1956)
- Rashomon – Chicago (1953)
- Moods From Shakespeare, USA Tour (1944–1953)
