= Abigail Scofield Kellogg =

American librarian

Abigail Scofield Kellogg (July 13, 1867 - February 27, 1958) was the San Luis Obispo City Librarian. She was one of the most popular residents of the community. She was a member of the American Library Association, California Library Association, and San Luis Obispo Monday Club, Book Club.

== Early life ==
Abigail Leontine Terese Scofield was born on July 13, 1870, in St. Joseph, Missouri, the daughter of Cyrus Ingerson Scofield, theologian and minister, author of the Scofield interpretative edition of the Bible, and Mary Leontine LeBeau Cerrè, a member of a prominent French Catholic family in St. Louis. She had one sister, Helen Marie Scofield Barlow. A brother, Guy Sylvester Scofield, died as a child. Mr. Scofield abandoned his wife and daughters and Leontine Cerrè Scofield divorced him on grounds of desertion in 1883 and moved with her daughters to Atchison, Kansas. Leontine Scofield was librarian of the Atchison public library for many years.

C.I. Scofield remarried to Hettie Hall von Wartz, and had a son, Noel Paul Scofield. Even after Mr. Scofield’s omission of his daughters from his 1920 biography, Kellogg continued to correspond with him. Despite this, Mr. Scofield’s will made no mention of either Abigail or Helen but left his entire estate, including the substantial royalty payments from Oxford University Press, to his wife Hettie Scofield and his son Noel Paul Scofield.

Kellogg graduated from the Atchison High School and taught in the elementary schools of Atchison for many years.

== Personal life ==
On June 23, 1902, Abigail Scofield married Dr. Edward Lincoln Kellogg, a dentist in Atchison and a prominent member of the Trinity Episcopal church. To improve her husband‘s health, they moved first to West Plains, Missouri and then to California in 1913 and lived at 1356 Higuera Street, San Luis Obispo, California.

After the death of both her husband and her brother-in-law, she went back to Atchison to live with her sister. She died on February 27, 1958, in Atchison, Kansas, and was buried in the Mt. Calvary cemetery.
