= James Inglis (evangelist) =

American preacher

James Inglis (1813–1872) was an American preacher and editor who was one of the earliest advocates of dispensational premillennialism in the United States.

Inglis was born in Scotland and immigrated to the United States in 1848, settling in Michigan. In Adrian, Michigan he was converted to the Baptist faith, and shortly after that became pastor of the First Baptist Church in Detroit, Michigan. In 1864 he began to publish Waymarks in the Wilderness. In this publication he admitted to drawing on the teaching of John Nelson Darby and the Plymouth Brethren in advocating the secret coming of Jesus Christ and the rapture, which is more commonly known as dispensational futurism. It teaches the secret coming and the removal for a time of the faithful, however not the view that there are different dispensations of the gospel, that distinguishes it from other forms of premillennialism.

Inglis would later move to Saint Louis, Missouri and eventually New York City and would continue to publish Waymarks in the Wilderness sporadically until his death.

== Sources ==
- Ernest R. Sandeen (2008) [1970]. The Roots of Fundamentalism: British and American Millenarianism, 1800-1930. University of Chicago Press. ISBN 978-0-226-73468-2. Pages 100-101

== Bibliography ==
- The Bible Text Cyclopedia: A Complete Classification of Scripture Texts in the Form of an Alphabetical List of Subjects
- The Sabbath School and Bible Teaching
- James Inglis (1864). Waymarks in the Wilderness and Scriptural Guide. Volume II, Nos. 1-6
- James Inglis (1867). Waymarks in the Wilderness, and Scriptural Guide. Volume V, No.4, and Volume VIII, No. 2
