= Jimmy Inglis (footballer, born 1951) =

Scottish footballer

Personal information
- Full name: James George Inglis
- Date of birth: 11 July 1951 (age 75)
- Place of birth: Hillhead, Scotland
- Position: Outside right

Senior career*
Years	Team	Apps	(Gls)
- Weir's Recreation
1973–1975	Queen's Park	39	(4)

International career
1974	Scotland Amateurs	3	(0)
- * Club domestic league appearances and goals

James George Inglis (born 11 July 1951) is a Scottish former amateur football outside right who played in the Scottish League for Queen's Park. He was capped by Scotland at amateur level.
