= Court Theatre (Chicago) =

Theatre in Illinois

Coordinates: 41.7940°N 87.6009°W

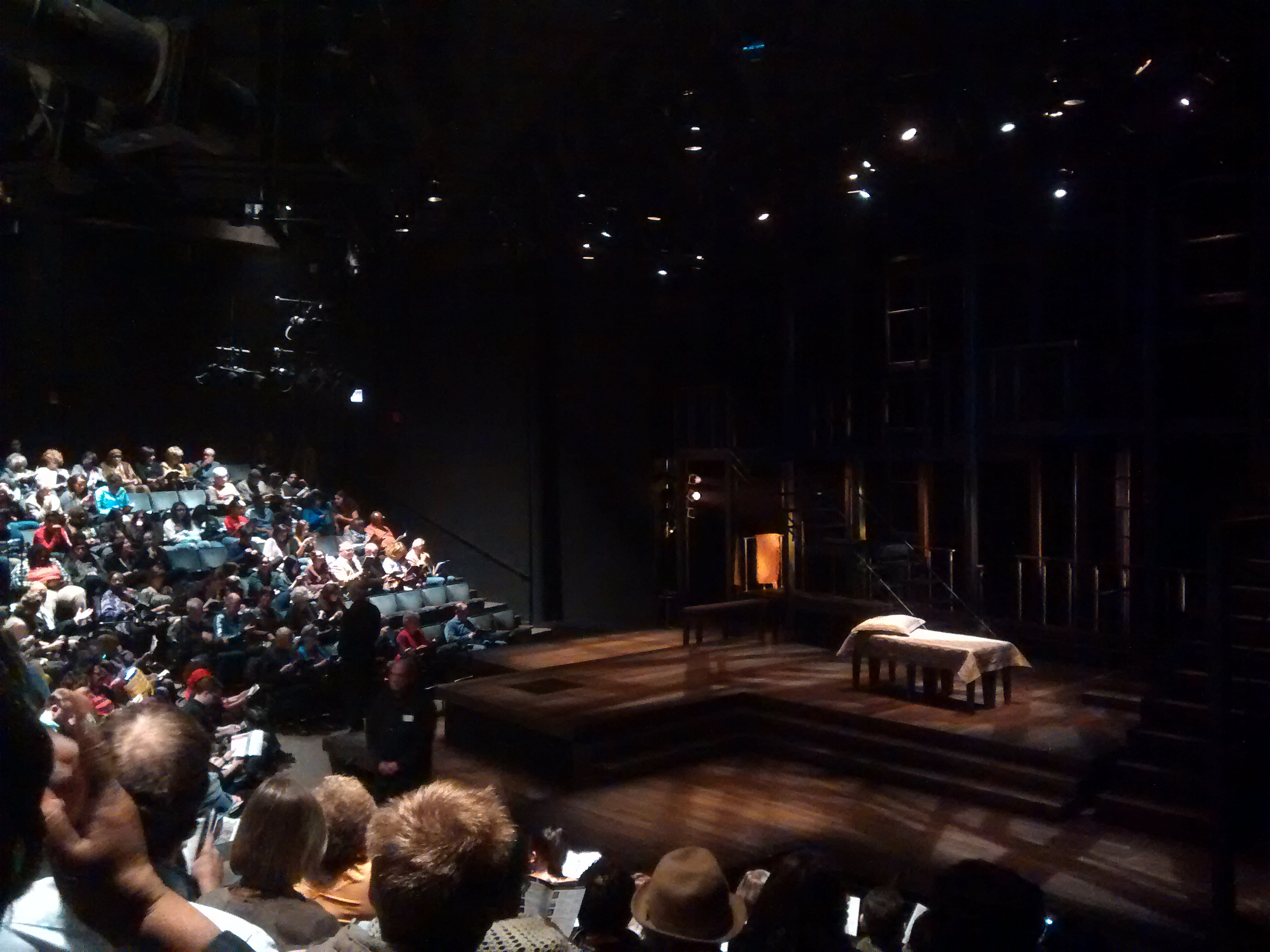

Court Theatre is a Tony Award-winning professional theatre company located in the Hyde Park neighborhood of Chicago, Illinois, where it was established in 1955. Court Theatre is affiliated with the University of Chicago, receiving in-kind support from the University and operating within the larger University umbrella. Court Theatre puts on four plays per season, which are attended by over 35,000 people each year, in addition to various other events throughout Chicago, such as staged readings, post-show discussions, film screenings, and book clubs.

== History ==
As of 2026, Avery Willis Hoffman is the Marilyn F. Vitale Artistic Director of Court Theatre. Past artistic directors include founding artistic director Nicholas Ruddall (1970-1994) and Charles Newell (1994-2024). In 2018, Angel Ysaguirre joined Court Theatre's leadership as Executive Director.

In 2010, Court Theatre established itself as the Center for Classic Theatre at the University of Chicago. As explained on the theatre's website, Court Theatre is dedicated to reimagining classic theatre to illuminate current times. Court Theatre has used the University as a resource in many ways, including through the development of new translations and adaptations of classic texts, receiving dramaturgical assistance from expert faculty, and hosting events related to the theatre's programming throughout the University's campus and the greater Hyde Park area. Court Theatre also provides resources for the University by providing exclusive internships to University of Chicago students, as well as maintaining a number of University affiliates on its Board of Trustees.

On June 12, 2022 Charles Newell, Marilyn F. Vitale Artistic Director, and Executive Director Angel Ysaguirre accepted the 2022 Regional Theatre Tony Award on behalf of Court Theatre at Radio City Music Hall.

== Current Season ==
Court Theatre's 72nd season is an exploration of Life, Liberty, and the Pursuit. According to its website, the 2026/27 season is an opportunity to "reexamine our systems and very ways of being, [challenge] long-held beliefs, and [ask] urgent questions" as America marks 250 years.

The 2026/27 season includes:

- Tituba, performed at the University of Chicago's Rockefeller Memorial Chapel
- Joe Turner's Come and Gone, directed by Resident Artist Ron OJ Parson and concluding August Wilson's American Century Cycle
- Mojada, co-directed by Wendy Matteo and Denise Yvette Serna and produced in partnership with Teatro Vista Productions
- safronia, a new opera from inaugural Chicago Poet Laureate avery r. young, directed by Timothy Douglas

== Additional Programming ==
Court Theatre offers robust educational programming for students across Chicagoland through its Student Matinees and teaching artist residencies. It also offers professional development programming for educators, empowering them to use theatrical practices as educational tools.

Each season features engagement programming, intended to foster conversation and connection between community members, artists, activists, and creatives. The most popular engagement program offered by Court Theatre is the Spotlight Reading Series, celebrating underproduced playwrights of color. The 2026 Spotlight Reading Series will celebrate the tenth anniversary of this acclaimed program.

== Notable productions ==
In 2025, Court Theatre received 21 Jeff Award nominations, the greatest number in its history. Of the 21 nominations, it won nine awards, the most of any other theatre company in the 2024/25 season. Court has won over 80 Jeff Awards in total, including awards for Best Production for the following shows:

The Tempest (play) (1978), directed by Robert Falls

The Triumph of Love (play) (1994), directed by Charles Newell

Putting It Together (musical) (1998), directed by Gary Griffin

Man of La Mancha (musical) (2006), directed by Charles Newell

Fences (play) (2006), directed by Ron OJ Parson

Caroline, or Change (musical) (2009), directed by Charles Newell

Blues for an Alabama Sky (play) (2017), directed by Ron OJ Parson

King Hedley II (play) (2020), directed by Ron OJ Parson

Berlin (2025), directed by Charles Newell
