= The Late Great Planet Earth =

1970 nonfiction book by Hal Lindsey and Carole C. Carlson

- Cover
- Authors: Hal Lindsey; Carole C. Carlson
- Language: English
- Subject: Eschatology
- Publisher: Zondervan
- Publication date: 1970
- Publication place: United States
- Media type: Print (Hardback and paperback)
- Pages: 242

The Late Great Planet Earth is a 1970 book by the American evangelical writer Hal Lindsey, with contributions by the American ghostwriter Carole C. Carlson, first published by Zondervan. The book analyzes Biblical passages which are compared to contemporary events of the late 1960s to make a case for the prophesied Christian end-times being likely to occur soon after publication.

The New York Times declared it to be the bestselling nonfiction book of the 1970s. Over 28 million copies have been sold and the book has been translated into 54 languages.

The book was first featured on a primetime television special featuring Hal Lindsey in 1974 and 1975 with an audience of 17 million and produced by Alan Hauge of GMT Productions. It was adapted by Rolf Forsberg and Robert Amram into a 1978 film narrated by Orson Welles and released by Pacific International Enterprises. Religion historian Crawford Gribben states that The Late Great Planet Earth "set a pattern for the shape of the political re-engagement of American evangelicals in the final third of the twentieth century" and "exercised enormous influence" in the Presidency of Ronald Reagan.

== Description ==
The Late Great Planet Earth is a treatment of dispensational premillennialism. As such, it compared end-time prophecies in the Bible with then-current events in an attempt to predict future scenarios resulting in the rapture of believers before the Great Tribulation and Second Coming of Jesus to establish his thousand-year (i.e. millennial) kingdom on Earth. Emphasizing various passages in the books of Daniel, Ezekiel and Revelation, Lindsey originally suggested the possibility that these climactic events might occur during the 1980s, which he interpreted as one generation from the foundation of modern Israel during 1948, a major event according to some dispensationalist evangelical schools of eschatological thought. Cover art of the Bantam edition suggested that the 1970s were the "era of the Antichrist as foretold by Moses and Jesus," and termed the book "a penetrating look at incredible ancient prophecies involving this generation." Descriptions of alleged "fulfilled" prophecy were offered as proof of the infallibility of God's word, and evidence that "unfulfilled" prophecies would soon find their denouement in God's plan for the planet.

He cited an increase in the frequency of famines, wars and earthquakes, as major events just prior to the end of the world. He also foretold a Soviet invasion of Israel (War of Gog and Magog). Lindsey also predicted that the European Economic Community, which preceded the European Union, was destined (according to Biblical prophecy) to become a "United States of Europe", which in turn he says is destined to become a "Revived Roman Empire" ruled by the Antichrist. Lindsey wrote that he had concluded, since there was no apparent mention of America in the books of Daniel or Revelation, that America would not be a major geopolitical power by the time the tribulations of the end times arrived. He found little in the Bible that could represent the U.S., but he suggested that Ezekiel 38:13 could be speaking of the U.S. in part.

Although Lindsey did not claim to know the dates of future events with any certainty, he suggested that Matthew 24:32-34 indicated that Jesus' return might be within "one generation" of the rebirth of the state of Israel, and the rebuilding of the Jewish Temple, and Lindsey asserted that "in the Bible" one generation is forty years. Some readers accepted this as an indication that the Tribulation or the Rapture would occur no later than 1988. In his 1980 work The 1980s: Countdown to Armageddon, Lindsey predicted that "the decade of the 1980s could very well be the last decade of history as we know it".

The Late Great Planet Earth was the first Christian prophecy book to be published by a secular publisher (Bantam, 1973) and sell many copies. Twenty-eight million copies had sold by 1990.

== Film adaptation ==
The book was adapted to film by Rolf Forsberg and Robert Amram. The film was narrated by Orson Welles and released in theaters in January 1978.

Welles opens by providing background information on the importance of prophets such as Jeremiah, Isaiah, Ezekiel and Amos in foretelling the arrival of Jesus as the Messiah. He also describes the visions of John of Patmos.

Hal Lindsey makes multiple appearances providing Biblical context to historical and then-current events, linking them to Biblical prophecy. He focuses on three key events prior to the arrival of the Antichrist:

1. The establishment of Israel in 1948.
2. Jerusalem's return to Israeli hands in 1967.
3. The restoration of the Temple of Solomon at some point in the near future.

Additional interviewees detail then-current and anticipated future crises facing humanity:

International relations
Aurelio Pecci; President, The Club of Rome
George Wald; Scientist, Nobel Prize winner
Norman Borlaug; Nobel Peace Prize winner
Emile Benoit; Economist, Columbia University
Desmond Morris; author of The Naked Ape

Natural disasters
John Gribbin; author of The Jupiter Effect
Paul Ehrlich; author of The Population Bomb
William Paddock; author of Famine 1975!

Nuclear war (international and via terrorism)
Joseph Waggoner, Jr.; US Congressman
George Kistiakowsky; Atomic scientist, Harvard University
George Rathjens; Professor of Political Science, MIT
Chaim Herzog; Israeli ambassador to the UN

Pollution, genetic engineering, plague
Jacques Piccard; Institut International d'Ecologie
Albert Rosenfield; author of The Second Genesis

New Age/alternative religions
Babetta; witch
Erin Cameron; astrologer
Tal Brooke; author of Lord of the Air
Maharishi Mahesh Yogi

Civil unrest
Robert Nisbet; Sociologist, Columbia University

Computers/"Mark of the Beast"
Peter Hamilton; computer security expert

Warfare
Elmo Zumwalt; Former Chief of Naval Operations

== Reception of the film ==
=== Critical ===
People magazine said, "Lindsey splices Bible prophecies of doom with contemporary signs. For instance, he says the Bible pinpoints Israel's rebirth as a nation as the catalyst to Judgment Day, which will probably occur by 1988. The intervening years will see the emergence of a 10-nation confederacy (prophet Daniel's dreadful 10-horned beast) or, as Lindsey sees it, the European Common Market. Eventually Russia (biblical Magog) will attack Israel and precipitate a global nuclear war. Only Jesus' followers will be spared. Hence, Lindsey advises, "the only thing you need to understand is that God offers you in Jesus Christ a full pardon."

Marc Jacobson wrote in The Village Voice, "Therein lies the major fault of The Late Great Planet Earth. To me, the Apocalypse is an intensely personal thing. I really don't need some self-help creep handing out a cover version. Every thinking human can and should conjure up his own version of doom, just like the graybeards in the Bible did. Screw ecologists. I stand with Carl Sandburg—a factory is as beautiful as a tree. Nuclear power doesn't scare me either. Not at all. I like watching slow-motion films of mushroom clouds; they have a restful, narcotic effect on me. Some day I hope to watch a four-hour VTR tape of A-bomb explosions on a seven-foot TV screen as I drink beer. In fact, I think it's fair to say I have a love-hate relationship with nuclear holocaust."

Gene Siskel gave the film a negative review in the Chicago Tribune. In his review, he gave it one star and called it a "chance to pay $3.50 to be told, unconvincingly, that 'The End is Near'." He also said that Welles' narration was "as entertaining as his Paul Masson Wine promise".

=== Box office ===
Franklin Harris of Splice Today wrote, "Coming nine years after Lindsey's book, the movie version of The Late Great Planet Earth was late to its own party". The Omen had already turned the Apocalypse into big-budget summer spectacle in 1976, and the steam was running out of the pseudo-historical documentary genre pioneered by Sunn Classic Pictures, which released In Search of Noah's Ark, The Bermuda Triangle, and The Lincoln Conspiracy. But The Omen was the No. 4 movie at the domestic box office in 1976, raking in $60.1 million. The No. 5 movie was, improbably, In Search of Noah's Ark, with a domestic tally of $55.7 million. So, the producers of The Late Great Planet Earth figured there was still money to be made. There was, although not nearly as much: in 1978, The Late Great Planet Earth grossed $19.5 million domestically against an estimated budget of $11 million." Another account said it made $5.25 million.

The New York Times noted, "The efficacy of the film's scare tactics is minimized by its applying biblical predictions too generally, and almost cavalierly at times – the most memorable sequence shows a computer conducting a numerological analysis of various politicians' names, to figure out if Jimmy Carter, Ronald Reagan or Ted Kennedy is the Antichrist. And Hal Lindsey, who co-wrote the book upon which the film is based and who appears with Mr. Welles as a co-narrator, speaks coolly, almost enthusiastically, about the prospect of worldwide destruction."

== Legacy ==
Religion historian Crawford Gribben states that the book "set a pattern for the shape of the political re-engagement of American evangelicals in the final third of the twentieth century." Gribben argues the book was hugely influential on US President Ronald Reagan's administration:

The Late Great Planet Earth exercised enormous influence inside Reagan's White House, and a number of cabinet members, including Attorney General Ed Meese, Secretary of Defense Caspar Weinberger, and Secretary of the Interior James Watt, shared the president’s dispensational views. Significantly, it was in a speech to the National Association of Evangelicals (1983) that Reagan made his apocalyptic reference to the 'evil empire' of the USSR. And The Late Great Planet Earth was central to this emerging political–theological platform. Lindsey appears to have briefed staff at the Pentagon, as well as military intelligence committees and staff at the State Department and the American Air War College, and there is evidence that some in the military elite were attracted to his analyses.

The book was an influence on the depiction of the Rapture in 1970s evangelical horror film A Thief in the Night, which became influential in its own right.

== See also ==
- 2012 phenomenon
- Apocalyptic literature
- Bible prophecy
- Death from the Skies, book
- Left Behind
- Human extinction
- The Last Days of the Late, Great State of California, a 1968 novel
- Unfulfilled Christian religious predictions
