= James Inglis (rugby union) =

English rugby union player

James Inglis (born 26 August 1986, Croydon, England) is a former rugby union player for Harlequins in the Guinness Premiership. He also went on loan to National League 1 team Esher. He played as a second-row.
