= Niagara Bible Conference =

Held annually from 1875 to 1897, with the exception of 1884

Believers' Meeting for Bible Study
- Nickname: Niagara Bible Conference
- Frequency: annual
- Locations: Queen's Royal Hotel, Niagara-on-the-Lake, Ontario (1883- )
- Years active: 1875-1897
- Major events: Bible study
- Leader: James H. Brookes
- Topics: Christian missions; prophecy; premillennialism; dispensationalism

The Niagara Bible Conference, officially called the Believers' Meeting for Bible Study, was held annually from 1875 to 1897, with the exception of 1884, in Niagara-on-the-Lake, Ontario, Canada.

== History ==
The Conference was founded as the Believers' Meeting for Bible Study in 1875 by evangelical pastors in the United States. The driving force behind the meeting was James H. Brookes, a Presbyterian minister from St. Louis. Brookes publicized the meeting through his magazine Truth, and devoted substantial space to summaries of the speeches.

Most of the speakers were dispensationalists, and the Niagara Conference introduced many evangelical Protestants to dispensationalist teaching. The messages generally centered on the doctrines of Christ, the Holy Spirit, the Bible, missions and prophecy. Premillennialism and dispensationalism were defended and taught.

In 1878, 14 fundamental creeds were established by evangelical pastors. The Niagara Creed does not explicitly affirm dispensationalism, but it refers to several key dispensationalist beliefs, including the reality of the millennium, the restoration of Israel, and the distinction between the judgment of the saved and the damned.

Starting in 1883, it was held in Niagara-on-the-Lake, Ontario at the Queen's Royal Hotel and its pavilion. In 1890, the Niagara Creed was officially adopted.
