= Hal Lindsey =

American evangelist and Christian writer (1929–2024)

- Born: Harold Lee Lindsey; November 23, 1929; Houston, Texas, U.S.
- Died: November 25, 2024 (aged 95); Tulsa, Oklahoma, U.S.
- Education: Dallas Theological Seminary
- Occupations: Writer, evangelist
- Spouses: Rose (first wife, divorced); Jan Houghton (second wife, divorced); Kim (third wife, divorced); JoLyn (fourth wife)
- Children: 3
- Website: hallindsey.com

Harold Lee Lindsey (November 23, 1929 – November 25, 2024) was an American evangelical writer and television host. He wrote a series of popular apocalyptic books – beginning with The Late Great Planet Earth (1970) – asserting that the Apocalypse or end time (including the rapture) was imminent because current events were fulfilling Bible prophecy. He was a Christian Zionist and dispensationalist.

== Biography ==
Lindsey was born in Houston on November 23, 1929. He enrolled at the University of Houston and served in the United States Coast Guard during the Korean War. He graduated from Dallas Theological Seminary in 1962 with a Master of Theology degree, majoring in the New Testament and early Greek literature.

With his second wife, Jan, he worked with Campus Crusade for Christ and continued with them until 1969. He then helped a mission in Southern California which continued until 1976. He was also a frequent speaker and Sunday School teacher at Melodyland Christian Center in Anaheim, California. During 1969, he wrote his first, and best-known book, The Late Great Planet Earth. Published during 1970 by Zondervan, this book became a bestseller. Coming on the heels of the Six-Day War, the book fueled the popularity of dispensationalism and its support of ethnic Jews as the "chosen people of God". Many of Lindsey's later writings are sequels or revisions and extensions of his first book. In 1994, he earned his Doctorate of Theology from the California Graduate School of Theology.

Lindsey hosted International Intelligence Briefing on the Trinity Broadcasting Network and served on the executive board of Christian Voice. International Intelligence Briefing was eliminated from broadcasting by TBN for the entire month of December 2005. Lindsey claimed that this was because "some at the network apparently feel that [his] message is too pro-Israel and too anti-Muslim." TBN owner Paul Crouch, however, contended that "TBN has never been and is not now against Israel and the Jewish people." Crouch said that Lindsey's show was pre-empted for Christmas programming.

Lindsey resigned from TBN on January 1, 2006, and indicated that he would pursue another television ministry. His next program, The Hal Lindsey Report, emphasized biblical prophecy and current events, and is broadcast by the Angel One and DayStar networks. During January 2007, Lindsey announced that he would be returning to the TBN network.

Lindsey was married four times and had three children from his second marriage. His second wife was Jan Houghton, and his fourth wife, to whom he was married at the time of his death, was named JoLyn. He lived in Tulsa, Oklahoma, and died at home on November 25, 2024, two days after his 95th birthday.

== Biblical interpretations ==
Lindsey's claims were based on a dispensationalist interpretation of the Old and New Testament. Lindsey claimed from the Bible that Jesus Christ will return from heaven to earth someday and establish eternal peace and harmony among all people.

Lindsey claimed the Bible contains numerous prophecies that foretell of certain conditions and events that will occur in the world prior to Christ's return and that as these things occur, they are to serve as signs and reminders that we are in the era that the Bible calls the end times or last days. Lindsey believed a prophetic event that officially begins the end times is the regathering of the Jewish people to their ancient homeland to form an independent nation after a prolonged worldwide dispersion. He claimed that the establishment of the State of Israel in May 1948 is the fulfillment of this major prophecy.

Like others in the American Christian right such as Pat Robertson, Lindsey was concerned with the New World Order (NWO), perceived to be "animated by a small number of overlapping philosophies, including, for example, socialism, feminism, and environmentalism", all falling under the label of globalism used by the Christian right. The NWO is believed to be created by globalists at organizations such as the World Trade Organization (WTO), the European Union (EU), and the United Nations (UN), and at odds with Christianity.

In The Late Great Planet Earth, Lindsey wrote that the biblical prophets identified certain nations that would ally with other countries to form "four major spheres of political power" during the same era that Israel would be reestablished as a nation. Lindsey wrote that these nations and their allies can be identified as: (1) Russia with its allies, (2) China with other nations of the Orient, (3) Egypt with other Middle East countries, and (4) an alliance of Western European nations.

According to Lindsey, the alliance of Western European nations is a revived form of the ancient Roman Empire, predicted in the books of Daniel and Revelation symbolically as ten horns and ten kings. In The Late Great Planet Earth, Lindsey quotes from a 1969 Time magazine article that the goal of the European Economic Community, which preceded the European Union, was to establish a ten-nation economic community. Lindsey concludes, based on this and other sources, that this alliance will help cause the fulfillment of this prophecy and will ultimately be ruled by the Antichrist.

Lindsey noted that the prophets did not refer to the United States directly or indirectly. He concluded that this is an indication that the U.S. will no longer be a great geo-political power by the time the Tribulation of the end times arrives.

In a later book, titled The 1980s: Countdown to Armageddon, he indicated that he believed it was possible that the battle of Armageddon could occur in the not too distant future, stating, "the decade of the 1980s could very well be the last decade of history as we know it." He noted again that there is no reference to the U.S. in Bible prophecy. He listed a few scenarios that seemed plausible to him at the time: (1) A takeover by communists, (2) destruction by a surprise Soviet nuclear attack, or (3) becoming a dependent of the 10-nation European community. The book was on the New York Times bestseller list for 20 weeks.

His 1994 book Planet Earth 2000 A.D.: Will Mankind Survive?, while still emphasizing the EU, shifted its focus of concern towards the UN. Lindsey believed the UN used its massive influence to promote paganism, idol worship, globalism, and a one-world government. His 1998 Planet Earth: The Final Chapter, however, describes the UN's power as waning.

== Influence ==
In The Dominance of Evangelical Millennialism, 1970–2000, religion historian Crawford Gribben states that Lindsey and The Late Great Planet Earth had a significant impact on the administration of US President Ronald Reagan:

The Late Great Planet Earth exercised enormous influence inside Reagan's White House, and a number of cabinet members, including Attorney General Ed Meese, Secretary of Defense Caspar Weinberger, and Secretary of the Interior James G. Watt, shared the president’s dispensational views. Significantly, it was in a speech to the National Association of Evangelicals (1983) that Reagan made his apocalyptic reference to the 'evil empire' of the USSR. And The Late Great Planet Earth was central to this emerging political–theological platform. Lindsey appears to have briefed staff at the Pentagon, as well as military intelligence committees and staff at the State Department and the American Air War College, and there is evidence that some in the military elite were attracted to his analyses.

== Works ==
=== Books ===
- The Late Great Planet Earth (1970) w/ C.C. Carlson
- Homo Sapiens: Extinction or Evacuation (1971)
  - Reprint as World's Final Hour: Evacuation or Extinction (1976)
- Satan Is Alive and Well on Planet Earth (1972) w/ Carole C. Carlson
- The Late Great Planet Earth Song Book (1972), w/ Fred Bock
- The Guilt Trip: How to Realize God's Forgiving Love (1972)
- How to Prepare for Armageddon (1972, multiple authors)
- The Liberation of Planet Earth (1974)
- The Promise (1974)
- Hal Lindsey's There's a New World Coming (1974, comic book)
- When is Jesus Coming Again (1974, multiple authors)
- There's a New World Coming: An In-Depth Analysis of the Book of Revelation (1975, 1984)
- Hope for the Terminal Generation (1976)
- The Events That Changed My Life (1977)
- The 1980's: Countdown to Armageddon (1980)
- The Rapture: Truth or Consequences (1983)
- Prophetical Walk Through the Holy Land (1983)
- Combat Faith (1986)
- The Road to Holocaust (1990)
- Israel and the Last Days (1991)
- The Rise of Babylon and the Persian Gulf Crisis: A Special Report (1991) w/ Chuck Missler
- Planet Earth 2000 A.D.: Will Mankind Survive? (1994)
- The Final Battle (1995)
- Amazing Grace (1995)
- Steeling the Mind of America (1995, multiple authors)
- Blood Moon (1996)
- The Messiah (1996)
- Apocalypse Code (1997)
- Planet Earth: The Final Chapter (1999)
- Vanished into Thin Air: The Hope of Every Believer (1999)
- Combat Faith: Unshakable Faith for Every Day (1999)
- The Greatest Gift: God's Amazing Grace (1999)
- Facing Millennium Midnight (1999) w/ Cliff Ford
- The Promise of Bible Prophecy (2000)
- Why Do We Have Trials? (2001)
- The Everlasting Hatred: The Roots of Jihad (2002)
- Faith for Earth's Final Hour (2003)

=== Foreword by Hal Lindsey ===
- Birth of the Body: Acts 1-12 (1974) by Ray C. Stedman
- The Coming Russian Invasion of Israel (1974) by Thomas McCall and Zola Levitt
- The Beautiful Side of Evil (1982) by Johanna Michaelsen
- Like Lambs to the Slaughter (1989) by Johanna Michaelsen
- The Magog Invasion (1995) by Chuck Missler
- Happy Days and Dark Nights (1996) by Jerry and Susanne McClain with Marsha Gallardo
- The Shadow of the Apocalypse: When All Hell Breaks Loose (2004) by Paul Crouch
- Personal Revival: Come Near, Come Now, Come Alive (2007) by Gary Galbraith
- America's Coming Judgment: Where is Our Hope? (2017) by Thomas J. Hughes

== See also ==
- Christian eschatology
- Christian Voice (United States)
- Millennialism
- Summary of Christian eschatological differences
