= Christianity and Judaism =

Christianity and Judaism are the largest and twelfth-largest religions in the world, with approximately 2.5 billion and 14 million adherents, respectively. Both are monotheistic Abrahamic religions that originated in the Middle East.

Christianity began as a movement within Second Temple Judaism, and the two religions gradually diverged over the first few centuries of the Christian era. Today, both religions have denominational differences, but the main distinction is that Christianity recognizes Jesus as the Messiah foretold in the Hebrew Bible, whereas Judaism maintains that the Messiah has not yet arrived and that the era of prophecy concluded early in the Second Temple period.

Early Christianity distinguished itself by determining that observance of Jewish law (Hebrew: הֲלָכָה, romanized: Hălāḵā, lit. 'the Way')—at least in Pauline Christianity—was unnecessary for non-Jewish converts to Christianity. Another fundamental difference is the two religions' conceptions of God. Most Christian denominations believe in a triune God—its members being known as the Father, Son, and Holy Spirit—with the doctrine of the incarnation of the Son in Jesus being of special importance. In contrast, Judaism believes in and emphasizes the oneness of God and rejects the Christian concept of God in human form, let alone a divided one.

Christianity recognizes the Hebrew Bible (referred to as the Old Testament by Christians) as part of its scriptural canon while Judaism does not recognize the Christian New Testament as scripture. Judaism is also heavily informed by the Talmud, which, though not scripture, is still considered foundational to normative Judaism.

The relative importance of 'correct belief' (orthodoxy) versus 'correct practice' (orthopraxy) constitutes another important area of difference. Most forms of Christianity emphasize orthodoxy, focusing on the so-called New Covenant as mediated by Jesus, the Christ, as described in the New Testament. Judaism has traditionally been thought to emphasize orthopraxy, stressing the immutability of the covenants made between God and the Jewish people and the ongoing dialogue between Jews and God through the prophets.

In Christianity, good works would naturally follow from a person's correct belief, but do not contribute to a person's salvation. Some Catholic traditions, such as those of the Franciscans and liberation theology, explicitly value orthopraxy, and praxis is also of central importance in Eastern Christianity, with Maximus the Confessor going so far as to say that "theology without action is the theology of demons."

Christian conceptions of orthopraxy vary (e.g., Catholic social teaching and its preferential option for the poor; the Eastern Orthodox Church's practices of fasting, hesychasm, and asceticism; and the Protestant work ethic of Calvinists and others) but differ from Judaism in that they are not based on Halakha or interpretations of God's dialogue with the Jewish people.

While more liberal Jewish movements may not mandate observance of Halakha, Jewish life remains centered on individual and collective participation in an eternal dialogue with God through tradition, rituals, daily prayer, and ethical actions.

== Jewish self-identification ==
Judaism's purpose, found primarily in the books of Exodus, Leviticus, Numbers, and Deuteronomy, is to carry out the Mosaic covenant made between God and the Jewish people and its proselytes (גֵּרֵי צֶדֶק, gréi ṣedek, 'righteous converts'). The Torah (תּוֹרָה, 'Teaching')—comprising the Written Torah (תּוֹרָה שֶׁבִּכְתָב, Tōrā šebbīḵṯāv) and Oral Torah (תּוֹרָה שֶׁבְּעַל־פֶּה, Tōrā šebbəʿal-pe)—tells the story of this covenant and provides Jews with the terms of the covenant.

The Oral Torah contains the primary and maturing guide for Jews to live out the covenant, as expressed, for example, by Rabbi Yohanan in tractate Gittin 60b:6 in the Talmud. (Note: Rabbi Yohanan says: The Holy One, Blessed be He, made a covenant with the Jewish people only for the sake of the matters that were transmitted orally (be'al peh), as it is stated: "For on the basis of (al pi) these matters I have made a covenant with you and with Israel" (Exodus 34:27).) Thus, the Oral Torah is intended to guide Jews toward living holy and godly lives, and to bring holiness, peace and love into the world and into every part of life, so that life may be elevated to a high level of kedusha, originally through study and practice of the Torah, and since the destruction of the Second Temple, through prayer as expressed in tractate Sotah 49a: "Since the destruction of the Temple, every day is more cursed than the preceding one; and the existence of the world is assured only by the kedusha...and the words spoken after the study of Torah."

Since the adoption of the Amidah, the acknowledgement of God through the declaration from Isaiah 6:3: "Kadosh [holy], kadosh, kadosh, is HaShem, Master of Legions; the whole world is filled with His glory" as a replacement for the study of Torah, which is a daily obligation for Jews, and sanctifies God in itself. This allows the Jewish people as a community to strive and, over the course of history, fulfill the prophecy "I, the Lord, have called you in righteousness, and will hold your hand and keep you. And I will establish you as a covenant of the people, for a light unto the nations." It additionally allows them to fulfill a part of the divine intent of bringing about an age of peace and sanctity where ideally a faithful life and good deeds should be ends in themselves, not means (see also Jewish principles of faith).

According to Christian theologian Alister McGrath, the Jewish Christians affirmed every aspect of then-contemporary Second Temple Judaism with the addition of the belief that Jesus was the Messiah, with Isaiah 49:6, "an explicit parallel to 42:6" quoted by Paul the Apostle in Acts 13:47 and reinterpreted by Justin Martyr. According to Christian writers, most notably Paul, the Bible teaches that people are, in their current state, sinful, and the New Testament reveals that Jesus is both the Son of man and the Son of God, united in the hypostatic union, God the Son, God made incarnate; that Jesus' death by crucifixion was a sacrifice to atone for all of humanity's sins, and that acceptance of Jesus as Savior and Lord saves one from Divine Judgment, giving Eternal life. Jesus is the mediator of the New Covenant. His Sermon on the Mount is considered by some Christian scholars to be the proclamation of the New Covenant ethics, in contrast to the Mosaic Covenant of Moses from Mount Sinai.

Some scholars, like Margaret Barker, propose that early Christianity has roots in First Temple Israelite religion, which is dubbed the "Temple Theology". Barker's work has been criticized for engaging in parallelomania and failing to engage in the broader scholarly literature, but it has gained some religious and academic support.

== Sacred texts ==
The Hebrew Bible is composed of three parts: the Torah ('instruction'; the Septuagint translated the Hebrew to nomos or Law), the Nevi'im (Prophets) and the Ketuvim (Writings). Collectively, these are known as the Tanakh. According to Rabbinic Judaism the Torah was revealed by God to Moses; within it, Jews find 613 mitzvot (commandments).

Rabbinic tradition asserts that God revealed two Torahs to Moses, one that was written down, and one that was transmitted orally. Whereas the written Torah has a fixed form, the Oral Torah is a living tradition that includes not only specific supplements to the written Torah (for instance, what is the proper manner of shechita and what is meant by "Frontlets" in the Shema), but also procedures for understanding and talking about the written Torah (thus, the Oral Torah revealed at Sinai includes debates among rabbis who lived long after Moses). The Oral Law elaborations of narratives in the Bible and stories about the rabbis are referred to as aggadah. It also includes elaboration of the 613 commandments in the form of laws referred to as halakha. Elements of the Oral Torah were committed to writing and edited by Judah HaNasi in the Mishnah in 200 CE; much more of the Oral Torah were committed to writing in the Babylonian and Jerusalem Talmuds, which were edited around 600 CE and 450 CE, respectively. The Talmuds are notable for the way they combine law and lore, for their explication of the midrashic method of interpreting texts, and for their accounts of debates among rabbis, which preserve divergent and conflicting interpretations of the Bible and legal rulings.

Since the transcription of the Talmud, notable rabbis have compiled law codes that are generally held in high regard: the Mishneh Torah, the Tur, and the Shulchan Aruch. The latter, which was based on earlier codes and supplemented by the commentary by Moshe Isserles that notes other practices and customs practiced by Jews in different communities, especially among Ashkenazim, is generally held to be authoritative by Orthodox Jews. The Zohar, which was written in the 13th century, is generally held as the most important esoteric treatise of the Jews.

All contemporary Jewish movements consider the Tanakh, and the Oral Torah in the form of the Mishnah and Talmuds as sacred, although movements are divided as to claims concerning their divine revelation, and also their authority. For Jews, the Torah—written and oral—is the primary guide to the relationship between God and man, a living document that has unfolded and will continue to unfold whole new insights over the generations and millennia. A saying that captures this goes, "Turn it [the Torah's words] over and over again, for everything is in it."

Christians accept the Written Torah and other books of the Hebrew Bible (alternatively called Old Testament) as Scripture, although they generally give readings from the Koine Greek Septuagint translation instead of the Biblical Hebrew/Biblical Aramaic Masoretic Text. Two notable examples are:

- Isaiah 7:14 – "virgin" instead of "young woman"
- Psalm 22:16 – "they have pierced my hands and feet" instead of "like a lion, (they are at) my hands and feet"

Instead of the traditional Jewish order and names for the books, Christians organize and name the books closer to that found in the Septuagint. Some Christian denominations (such as Anglican, Roman Catholic, and Eastern Orthodox), include a number of books that are not in the Hebrew Bible (the biblical apocrypha or deuterocanonical books or Anagignoskomena, see Development of the Old Testament canon) in their biblical canon that are not in today's Jewish canon, although they were included in the Septuagint. Christians reject the Jewish Oral Torah, which was still in oral, and therefore unwritten, form in the time of Jesus.

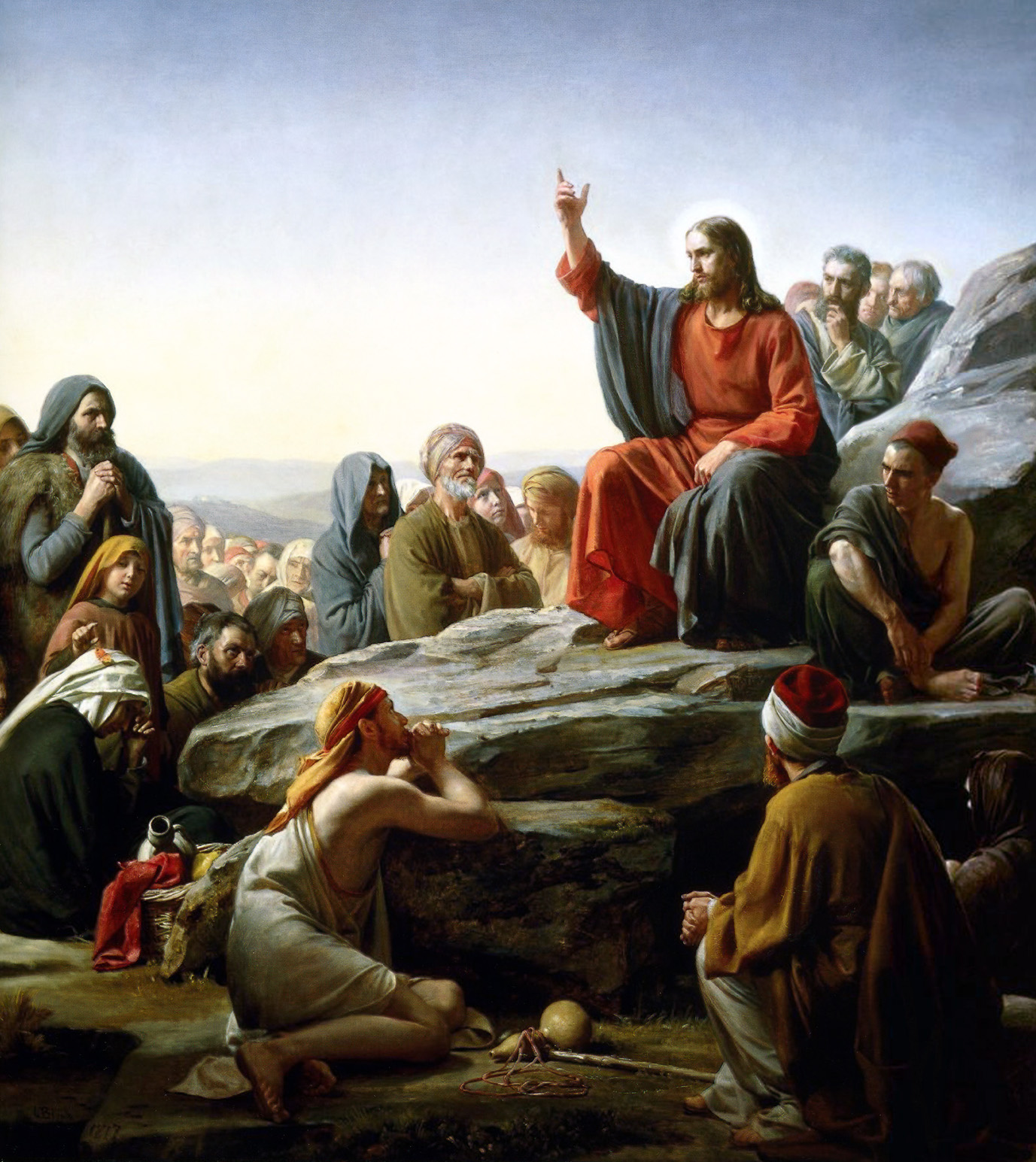
Jesus depicted delivering the Sermon on the Mount which included commentary on the Old Covenant. Some scholars consider this to be an antitype of the proclamation of the Ten Commandments or Mosaic Covenant by Moses from the Biblical Mount Sinai.

== Covenant theology ==
Christians believe that God has established a New Covenant with people through Jesus, as recorded in the Gospels, Acts of the Apostles, Epistles, and other books collectively called the New Testament (the word testament attributed to Tertullian is commonly interchanged with the word covenant). For some Christians, such as Roman Catholics and Orthodox Christians, this New Covenant includes authoritative sacred traditions and canon law. Others, especially Protestants, reject the authority of such traditions and instead hold to the principle of sola scriptura, which accepts only the Bible itself as the final rule of faith and practice. Anglicans do not believe in sola scriptura. For them, scripture is the longest leg of a 3-legged stool: scripture, tradition, and reason. Scripture cannot stand on its own since it must be interpreted in the light of the Church's patristic teaching and ecumenical creeds. Additionally, some denominations include the "oral teachings of Jesus to the Apostles", which they believe have been handed down to this day by apostolic succession.

Christians refer to the canonized books about Jesus as the New Testament and to the canon of the Hebrew Bible as the Old Testament. Judaism does not accept the retronymic labelling of its sacred texts as the "Old Testament", and some Jews refer to the New Testament as the Christian Testament or Christian Bible. Judaism rejects all claims that the Christian New Covenant supersedes, abrogates, fulfils, or is the unfolding or consummation of the covenant expressed in the Written and Oral Torahs. Therefore, just as Christianity does not accept that Mosaic law has any authority over Christians, Judaism does not accept that the New Testament has any religious authority over Jews.

== Law ==
Many Jews view Christians as having quite an ambivalent view of the Torah and the laws contained in it: on one hand, Christians speak of it as God's absolute word, but on the other, they apply its commandments with a certain selectivity. Some Jews contend that Christians cite commandments from the Hebrew Bible to support one point of view but then ignore other commandments of a similar class and equal weight. Examples of this are certain commandments that God states explicitly to be a "lasting covenant." Some translate the Hebrew as a "perpetual covenant."

Christians explain that such selectivity is based on rulings made by early Jewish Christians in the Book of Acts, at the Council of Jerusalem, that, while believing gentiles did not need to convert to Judaism fully, they should follow some aspects of Torah like avoiding idolatry, fornication, and blood. This view is also reflected by modern Judaism, in that righteous gentiles need not convert to Judaism and need to observe only the Noahide laws, which also contain prohibitions against idolatry and fornication and blood.

Some Christians agree that Jews who accept Jesus should still observe all of the Torah—see, for example dual-covenant theology—based on warnings by Jesus to Jews not to use him as an excuse to disregard it, and they support efforts of those such as Messianic Jews (Messianic Judaism is considered by most Christians and Jews to be a form of Christianity) to do that, but some Protestant forms of Christianity oppose all observance of the Mosaic law, even by Jews, which Luther criticised as antinomianism.

A minority view in Christianity, known as Christian Torah-submission, holds that the Mosaic law as it is written is binding on all followers of God under the New Covenant, even for gentiles, because it views God's commands as "everlasting" and "good."

== Concepts of God ==
Traditionally, both Judaism and Christianity believe in the God of Abraham, Isaac, and Jacob: for Jews, the God of the Tanakh, and for Christians, the God of the Old Testament. Judaism and major sects of Christianity reject the view that God is entirely immanent and within the world as a physical presence (although Christians believe in the incarnation of God). Both religions reject the view that God is entirely transcendent, and thus separate from the world, as was the pre-Christian Greek Unknown God mentioned in the New Testament. Both religions reject atheism on one hand and pure polytheism on the other.

Both religions agree that God shares both transcendent and immanent qualities. These religions differ in how they resolve this issue. Christianity posits that God exists as a Trinity; in this view, God exists as three distinct persons who share a single divine essence or substance. In those three, there is one God; in that one, there are three. The one God is indivisible, while the three persons are distinct and unconfused (God the Father, God the Son, and God the Holy Spirit). Christianity teaches that God became especially immanent in corporeal form through the incarnation of God the Son as Jesus of Nazareth, who is believed to be fully God and fully human. Some Christian denominations and movements question the Trinity and incarnation, including those holding to nontrinitarianism.

By contrast, Judaism teaches that God is an uncompromised and singular entity, viewing trinitarianism as both incomprehensible and a violation of the Hebrew Bible's theology of God-as-one. It rejects the notion that Jesus or any other object or living being could be 'God', that God could have a literal 'son' in physical form or be divisible in any way, and that God could or would join the material world in such fashion. Although Judaism has labels for God's transcendence (Ein Sof 'without end') and immanence (Shekhinah 'in-dwelling'), they are understood to be human experiences of God's being, not ontological realities.

=== Shituf ===
A minority Jewish view maintains that while Christian worship is polytheistic (due to the multiplicity of the Trinity), it is permissible for Christians to swear in God's name as they are referring to the one God. This theology is referred to in Hebrew as Shituf (literally "partnership" or "association"). Although worship of a trinity is considered to be no different from any other form of idolatry, it may be an acceptable religion for non-Jews (according to the ruling of some Rabbinic authorities).

== Right action ==
=== Faith versus good deeds ===
Judaism teaches that the purpose of the Torah is to teach us how to act correctly. God's existence is a given in Judaism, and not something that most authorities see as a matter of required belief. Although some authorities see the Torah as commanding Jews to believe in God, Jews see belief in God as a necessary, but not sufficient, condition for a Jewish life. The quintessential verbal expression of Judaism is the Shema Yisrael, the statement that the God of the Bible is their God, and that this God is unique and one. The quintessential physical expression of Judaism is behaving in accordance with the 613 Mitzvot (the commandments specified in the Torah), and thus live one's life in God's ways.

Thus fundamentally in Judaism, one is enjoined to bring holiness into life (with the guidance of God's laws), rather than removing oneself from life to be holy.

Much of Christianity also teaches that God wants people to perform good works, but all branches hold that good works alone will not lead to salvation, which is called Legalism, the exception being dual-covenant theology. Some Christian denominations hold that salvation depends upon transformational faith in Jesus, which expresses itself in good works as a testament (or witness) to one's faith for others to see (primarily Eastern Orthodox Christianity and Roman Catholicism), while others (including most Protestants) hold that faith alone is necessary for salvation. Some argue that the difference is not as great as it seems, because it really hinges on the definition of "faith" used. The first group generally uses the term "faith" to mean "intellectual and heartfelt assent and submission". Such a faith will not be salvific until a person has allowed it to effect a life transforming conversion (turning towards God) in their being (see Ontotheology). The Christians that hold to "salvation by faith alone" (also called by its Latin name "sola fide") define faith as being implicitly ontological—mere intellectual assent is not termed "faith" by these groups. Faith, then, is life-transforming by definition.

=== Sin ===
In both religions, offenses against the will of God are called sin. These sins can be thoughts, words, or actions.

Catholicism categorizes sins into various groups. A wounding of the relationship with God is often called venial sin; a complete rupture of the relationship with God is often called a mortal sin. Without salvation from sin (see below), a person's separation from God is permanent, causing such a person to enter Hell in the afterlife. Both the Catholic Church and the Orthodox Church define sin more or less as a "macula", a spiritual stain or uncleanliness that constitutes damage to man's image and likeness of God.

Hebrew has several words for sin, each with its own specific meaning. The word pesha, or "trespass", means a sin done out of rebelliousness. The word aveira means "transgression". And the word avone, or "iniquity", means a sin done out of moral failing. The word most commonly translated simply as "sin", het, literally means "to go astray". Just as Jewish law, halakha provides the proper "way" (or path) to live, sin involves straying from that path. Judaism teaches that humans are born with free will, and morally neutral, with both a yetzer hatov, (literally, "the good inclination", in some views, a tendency towards goodness, in others, a tendency towards having a productive life and a tendency to be concerned with others) and a yetzer hara, (literally "the evil inclination", in some views, a tendency towards evil, and in others, a tendency towards base or animal behavior and a tendency to be selfish). In Judaism all human beings are believed to have free will and can choose the path in life that they will take. It does not teach that choosing good is impossible—only at times more difficult. There is almost always a "way back" if a person wills it. (Although texts mention certain categories for whom the way back will be exceedingly hard, such as the slanderer, the habitual gossip, and the malicious person)

The rabbis recognize a positive value to the yetzer hara: one tradition identifies it with the observation on the last day of creation that God's accomplishment was "very good" (God's work on the preceding days was just described as "good") and explain that without the yetzer ha'ra there would be no marriage, children, commerce or other fruits of human labor; the implication is that yetzer ha'tov and yetzer ha'ra are best understood not as moral categories of good and evil but as selfless versus selfish orientations, either of which used rightly can serve God's will.

In contrast to the Jewish view of being morally balanced, Original Sin refers to the idea that the sin of Adam and Eve's disobedience (sin "at the origin") has passed on a spiritual heritage, so to speak. Christians teach that human beings inherit a corrupted or damaged human nature in which the tendency to do bad is greater than it would have been otherwise, so much so that human nature would not be capable now of participating in the afterlife with God. This is not a matter of being "guilty" of anything; each person is only personally guilty of their own actual sins. However, this understanding of original sin is what lies behind the Christian emphasis on the need for spiritual salvation from a spiritual Savior, who can forgive and set aside sin even though humans are not inherently pure and worthy of such salvation. Paul the Apostle in Romans and I Corinthians placed special emphasis on this doctrine, and stressed that belief in Jesus would allow Christians to overcome death and attain salvation in the hereafter.

Roman Catholics, Eastern Orthodox Christians, and some Protestants, namely Lutherans and some segments of Anglicanism, teach the Sacrament of Baptism is the means by which each person's damaged human nature is healed and sanctifying grace (capacity to enjoy and participate in the spiritual life of God) is restored. This is referred to as "being born of water and the Spirit", following the terminology in the Gospel of St. John. Most Protestants believe this salvific grace comes about at the moment of personal decision to follow Jesus, and that baptism is a symbol of the grace already received.

=== Love ===
The Hebrew word for "love", ahavah (אהבה), is used to describe intimate or romantic feelings or relationships, such as the love between parent and child in Genesis 22:2; 25: 28; 37:3; the love between close friends in I Samuel 18:2, 20:17; or the love between a young man and young woman in Song of Songs. Christians will often use the Greek of the Septuagint to make distinctions between the types of love: philia for brotherly, eros for romantic and agape for self-sacrificing love.

Like many Jewish scholars and theologians, literary critic Harold Bloom understands Judaism as fundamentally a religion of love. But he argues that one can understand the Hebrew conception of love only by looking at one of the core commandments of Judaism, Leviticus 19:18, "Love your neighbor as yourself", also called the second Great Commandment. Talmudic sages Hillel and Rabbi Akiva commented that this is a major element of the Jewish religion. Also, this commandment is arguably at the center of the Jewish faith. As the third book of the Torah, Leviticus is literally the central book. Historically, Jews have considered it of central importance: traditionally, children began their study of the Torah with Leviticus, and the midrashic literature on Leviticus is among the longest and most detailed of midrashic literature. Bernard Jacob Bamberger considers Leviticus 19, beginning with God's commandment in verse 3—"You shall be holy, for I the Lord your God, am holy"—to be "the climactic chapter of the book, the one most often read and quoted" (1981:889). Leviticus 19:18 is itself the climax of this chapter.

=== Abortion ===
The only statements in the Tanakh about the status of a fetus state that killing an unborn infant does not have the same status as killing a born human being, and mandates a much lesser penalty. (Although this interpretation is disputed, with many contemporary biblical scholars stating that the passage could refer to an injury to a woman that causes a premature, live birth).

The Talmud states that the fetus is not yet a full human being until it has been born (either the head or the body is mostly outside of the woman), therefore killing a fetus is not murder, and abortion—in restricted circumstances—has always been legal under Jewish law. Rashi, the 11th-century commentator on the Bible and Talmud, states clearly of the fetus lav nefesh hu: "it is not a person". The Talmud contains the expression ubar yerech imo—the fetus is as the thigh of its mother,' i.e., the fetus is deemed to be part and parcel of the pregnant woman's body. The Babylonian Talmud Yevamot 69b states that: "the embryo is considered to be mere water until the fortieth day." Afterwards, it is considered subhuman until it is born. Christians who agree with these views may refer to this idea as abortion before the quickening of the fetus.

Jewish law requires abortion if doctors believe that it is necessary to save the life of the woman. Many rabbinic authorities allow abortions on the grounds of gross genetic imperfections of the fetus. They also allow abortion if the woman were suicidal because of such defects. However, Judaism holds that abortion is impermissible for family planning or convenience reasons. Each case must be decided individually, however, and the decision should lie with the pregnant woman, the man who impregnated her, and their Rabbi.

=== War, violence and pacifism ===
Jews and Christians accept as valid and binding many of the same moral principles taught in the Torah. There is a great deal of overlap between the ethical systems of these two faiths. Nonetheless, there are some highly significant doctrinal differences.

Judaism has many teachings about peace and compromise, and its teachings make physical violence the last possible option. Nonetheless, the Talmud teaches that "If someone comes with the intention to murder you, then one is obligated to kill in self-defense [rather than be killed]". The clear implication is that to bare one's throat would be tantamount to suicide (which Jewish law forbids) and it would also be considered helping a murderer kill someone and thus would "place an obstacle in front of a blind man" (i.e., makes it easier for another person to falter in their ways). The tension between the laws dealing with peace, and the obligation to self-defense, has led to a set of Jewish teachings that have been described as tactical-pacifism. This is the avoidance of force and violence whenever possible, but the use of force when necessary to save the lives of one's self and one's people.

Although killing oneself is forbidden under normal Jewish law as being a denial of God's goodness in the world, under extreme circumstances when there has seemed no choice but to either be killed or forced to betray their religion, Jews have committed suicide or mass suicide (see Masada, First French persecution of the Jews, and York Castle for examples). As a grim reminder of those times, there is even a prayer in the Jewish liturgy for "when the knife is at the throat", for those dying "to sanctify God's Name". These acts have received mixed responses by Jewish authorities. Where some Jews regard them as examples of heroic martyrdom, but others saying that while Jews should always be willing to face martyrdom if necessary, it was wrong for them to take their own lives.

Because Judaism focuses on this life, many questions to do with survival and conflict (such as the classic moral dilemma of two people in a desert with only enough water for one to survive) were analyzed in great depth by the rabbis within the Talmud, in the attempt to understand the principles a godly person should draw upon in such a circumstance.

The Sermon on the Mount records that Jesus taught that if someone comes to harm you, then one must turn the other cheek. This has led four Protestant Christian denominations to develop a theology of pacifism, the avoidance of force and violence at all times. They are known historically as the peace churches, and have incorporated Christ's teachings on nonviolence into their theology so as to apply it to participation in the use of violent force; those denominations are the Quakers, Mennonites, Amish, and the Church of the Brethren. Many other churches have people who hold to the doctrine without making it a part of their doctrines, or who apply it to individuals but not to governments, see also Evangelical counsels. The vast majority of Christian nations and groups have not adopted this theology, nor have they followed it in practice. See also But to bring a sword.

=== Capital punishment ===
Although the Hebrew Bible has many references to capital punishment, the Jewish sages used their authority to make it nearly impossible for a Jewish court to impose a death sentence. Even when such a sentence might have been imposed, the Cities of Refuge and other sanctuaries, were at hand for those unintentionally guilty of capital offences. It was said in the Mishna about the death penalty in Judaism, that if a court killed more than one person in seventy years, it was a barbarous (or "bloody") court and should be condemned as such.

Christianity usually reserved the death penalty for heresy, the rejection of orthodox doctrine, and witchcraft or similar non-Christian practices. For example, in Spain, unrepentant Jews were exiled, and it was only those crypto-Jews who had accepted baptism under pressure but retained Jewish customs in private, who were punished in this way. It is presently acknowledged by most of Christianity that these uses of capital punishment were deeply immoral.

=== Taboo food and drink ===
Orthodox Jews, unlike most Christians, still practice a restrictive diet that has many rules. Most Christians believe that the kosher food laws have been superseded. For example, they cite what Jesus taught in Mark 7: what you eat doesn't make you unclean but what comes out of a man's heart makes him unclean—although Roman Catholicism and Eastern Orthodoxy have their own set of dietary observances. Eastern Orthodoxy, in particular has very elaborate and strict rules of fasting, and continues to observe the Council of Jerusalem's apostolic decree of Acts 15.

Some Christian denominations observe some biblical food laws, for example, the practice of Ital in Rastafari. Jehovah's Witnesses do not eat blood products and are known for their refusal to accept blood transfusions based on not "eating blood".

== Salvation ==
Judaism does not see human beings as inherently flawed or sinful and needful of being saved from it, but rather capable with a free will of being righteous, and unlike Christianity does not closely associate ideas of "salvation" with a New Covenant delivered by a Jewish messiah, although in Judaism Jewish people will have a renewed national commitment of observing God's commandments under the New Covenant, and the Jewish Messiah will also be ruling at a time of global peace and acceptance of God by all people.

Judaism holds instead that proper living is accomplished through good works and heartfelt prayer, as well as a strong faith in God. Judaism also teaches that gentiles can receive a share in "the world to come". This is codified in the Mishna Avot 4:29, the Babylonian Talmud in tractates Avodah Zarah 10b, and Ketubot 111b, and in Maimonides's 12th century law code, the Mishneh Torah, in Hilkhot Melachim (Laws of Kings) 8.11.

The Protestant view is that every human is a sinner, and being saved by God's grace, not simply by the merit of one's own actions, pardons a damnatory sentence to Hell.

=== Forgiveness ===
In Judaism, one must go to those he has harmed to be entitled to forgiveness. This means that in Judaism a person cannot obtain forgiveness from God for wrongs the person has done to other people. This also means that, unless the victim forgave the perpetrator before he died, murder is unforgivable in Judaism, and they will answer to God for it, though the victims' family and friends can forgive the murderer for the grief they caused them.

Thus the "reward" for forgiving others is not God's forgiveness for wrongs done to others, but rather help in obtaining forgiveness from the other person.

Jonathan Sacks, then Chief Rabbi of the United Hebrew Congregations of the Commonwealth, summarized: "it is not that God forgives, while human beings do not. To the contrary, we believe that just as only God can forgive sins against God, so only human beings can forgive sins against human beings."

=== Judgment ===
Both Christianity and Judaism believe in some form of judgement. Most Christians (the exception is Full Preterism) believe in the future Second Coming of Jesus, which includes the Resurrection of the Dead and the Last Judgment. Those who have accepted Jesus as their personal saviour will be saved and live in God's presence in the Kingdom of Heaven, those who have not accepted Jesus as their saviour, will be cast into the Lake of fire (eternal torment, finite torment, or simply annihilated), see for example The Sheep and the Goats.

In Jewish liturgy there is significant prayer and talk of a "book of life" that one is written into, indicating that God judges each person each year even after death. This annual judgment process begins on Rosh Hashanah and ends with Yom Kippur. Additionally, God sits daily in judgment concerning a person's daily activities. Upon the anticipated arrival of the Messiah, God will judge the nations for their persecution of Israel during the exile. Later, God will also judge the Jews over their observance of the Torah.

=== Heaven and Hell ===
There is little Jewish literature on heaven or hell as actual places, and there are few references to the afterlife in the Hebrew Bible. One is the ghostly apparition of Samuel, called up by the Witch of Endor at King Saul's command. Another is a mention by the Prophet Daniel of those who sleep in the earth rising to either everlasting life or everlasting abhorrence.

Early Hebrew views were more concerned with the fate of the nation of Israel as a whole, rather than with individual immortality. A stronger belief in an afterlife for each person developed during the Second Temple period but was contested by various Jewish sects. Pharisees believed that in death, people rest in their graves until they are physically resurrected with the coming of the Messiah, and within that resurrected body the soul would exist eternally. Maimonides also included the concept of resurrection in his Thirteen Principles of Faith.

Judaism's view is summed up by a biblical observation about the Torah: in the beginning God clothes the naked (Adam), and at the end God buries the dead (Moses). The Children of Israel mourned for 40 days, then got on with their lives.

In Judaism, Heaven is sometimes described as a place where God debates Talmudic law with the angels, and where Jews spend eternity studying the Written and Oral Torah. Jews do not believe in "Hell" as a place of eternal torment. Gehenna is a place or condition of purgatory where Jews spend up to twelve months purifying to get into heaven, depending on how sinful they have been, although some suggest that certain types of sinners can never be purified enough to go to heaven and rather than facing eternal torment, simply cease to exist. Therefore, some violations like suicide would be punished by separation from the community, such as not being buried in a Jewish cemetery (in practice, rabbis often rule suicides to be mentally incompetent and thus not responsible for their actions). Judaism also does not have a notion of hell as a place ruled by Satan since God's dominion is total and Satan is only one of God's angels.

Catholics also believe in a purgatory for those who are going to heaven, but Christians in general believe that Hell is a fiery place of torment that never ceases, called the Lake of Fire. A small minority believe this is not permanent, and that those who go there will eventually either be saved or cease to exist. Heaven for Christians is depicted in various ways. As the Kingdom of God described in the New Testament and particularly the Book of Revelation, Heaven is a new or restored earth, a World to Come, free of sin and death, with a New Jerusalem led by God, Jesus, and the most righteous of believers starting with 144,000 Israelites from every tribe, and all others who received salvation living peacefully and making pilgrimages to give glory to the city.

In Christianity, promises of Heaven and Hell as rewards and punishments are often used to motivate good and bad behavior, as threats of disaster were used by prophets like Jeremiah to motivate the Israelites. Modern Judaism generally rejects this form of motivation, instead teaching to do the right thing because it's the right thing to do. As Maimonides wrote:

"A man should not say: I shall carry out the precepts of the Torah and study her wisdom in order to receive all the blessings written therein or in order to merit the life of the World to Come and I shall keep away from the sins forbidden by the Torah in order to be spared the curses mentioned in the Torah or in order not to be cut off from the life of the World to Come. It is not proper to serve God in this fashion. For one who serves thus serves out of fear. Such a way is not that of the prophets and sages. Only the ignorant, and the women and children serve God in this way. These are trained to serve out of fear until they obtain sufficient knowledge to serve out of love. One who serves God out of love studies the Torah and practices the precepts and walks in the way of wisdom for no ulterior motive at all, neither out of fear of evil nor in order to acquire the good, but follows the truth because it is true and the good will follow the merit of attaining to it. It is the stage of Abraham our father whom the Holy One, blessed be God, called "My friend" (Isaiah 41:8 – ohavi = the one who loves me) because he served out of love alone. It is regarding this stage that the Holy One, Blessed be God, commanded us through Moses, as it is said: "You shall love the Lord your God" (Deuteronomy 6:5). When man loves God with a love that is fitting he automatically carries out all the precepts of love.

(Maimonides Yad Chapter 10, quoted in Jacobs 1973: 159)

=== The Messiah ===
Jews believe that a descendant of King David will one day appear to restore the Kingdom of Israel and usher in an era of peace, prosperity, and spiritual understanding for Israel and all the nations of the world. Jews refer to this person as Moshiach or "anointed one", translated as messiah in English. The traditional Jewish understanding of the messiah is that he is fully human and born of human parents without any supernatural element. The messiah is expected to have a relationship with God similar to that of the prophets of the Tanakh. In the Mishneh Torah (Hilkhot Melakhim 11), Maimonides (Rabbi Moshe ben Maimon) wrote:

All of the people Israel will come back to Torah; The people of Israel will be gathered back to the land of Israel; The Temple in Jerusalem will be rebuilt; Israel will live among the nations as an equal, and will be strong enough to defend herself; Eventually, war, hatred and famine will end, and an era of peace and prosperity will come upon the Earth.

He adds:

"And if a king shall stand up from among the House of David, studying Torah and indulging in commandments like his father David, according to the written and oral Torah, and he will coerce all Israel to follow it and to strengthen its weak points, and will fight The Lord's wars, this one is to be treated as if he were the anointed one. If he succeeded [and won all nations surrounding him. Old prints and mss.] and built a Holy Temple in its proper place and gathered the strayed ones of Israel together, this is indeed the anointed one for certain, and he will mend the entire world to worship the Lord together ... But if he did not succeed until now, or if he was killed, it becomes known that he is not this one of whom the Torah had promised us, and he is indeed like all [other] proper and wholesome kings of the House of David who died."

He also clarified the nature of the Messiah:

"Do not imagine that the anointed King must perform miracles and signs and create new things in the world or resurrect the dead and so on. The matter is not so: For Rabbi Akiba was a great scholar of the sages of the Mishnah, and he was the assistant-warrior of the king Ben Coziba Simon bar Kokhba... He and all the Sages of his generation deemed him the anointed king, until he was killed by sins; only since he was killed, they knew that he was not. The Sages asked him neither a miracle nor a sign..."

The Christian view of Jesus as Messiah goes beyond such claims and is the fulfillment and union of three anointed offices; a prophet like Moses who delivers God's commands and covenant and frees people from bondage, a High Priest in the order of Melchizedek overshadowing the Levite priesthood and a king like King David ruling over Jews, and like God ruling over the whole world and coming from the line of David.

For Christians, Jesus is also fully human and fully divine as the Word of God who sacrifices himself so that humans can receive salvation. Jesus sits in Heaven at the Right Hand of God and will judge humanity in the end times when he returns to earth.

Christian readings of the Hebrew Bible find many references to Jesus. This can take the form of specific prophesy, and in other cases of foreshadowing by types or forerunners. Traditionally, most Christian readings of the Bible maintained that almost every prophecy was actually about the coming of Jesus, and that the entire Old Testament of the Bible is a prophecy about the coming of Jesus.

==== Catholic views ====
Catholicism teaches Extra Ecclesiam Nulla Salus ("Outside the Church there is no salvation"), which some, like Fr. Leonard Feeney, interpreted as limiting salvation to Catholics only. At the same time, it does not deny the possibility that those not visibly members of the Church may attain salvation as well. In recent times, its teaching has been most notably expressed in the Vatican II council documents Unitatis Redintegratio (1964), Lumen gentium (1964), Nostra aetate (1965), an encyclical issued by Pope John Paul II: Ut unum sint (1995), and in a document issued by the Congregation for the Doctrine of the Faith, Dominus Iesus in 2000. The latter document has been criticised for claiming that non-Christians are in a "gravely deficient situation" as compared to Catholics, but also adds that "for those who are not formally and visibly members of the Church, salvation in Christ is accessible by virtue of a grace which, while having a mysterious relationship to the Church, does not make them formally part of the Church, but enlightens them in a way which is accommodated to their spiritual and material situation."

Pope John Paul II on 2 October 2000 emphasized that this document did not say that non-Christians were actively denied salvation: "...this confession does not deny salvation to non-Christians, but points to its ultimate source in Christ, in whom man and God are united". On 6 December the Pope issued a statement to further emphasize that the Church continued to support its traditional stance that salvation was available to believers of other faiths: "The gospel teaches us that those who live in accordance with the Beatitudes—the poor in spirit, the pure of heart, those who bear lovingly the sufferings of life—will enter God's kingdom." He further added, "All who seek God with a sincere heart, including those who do not know Christ and his church, contribute under the influence of Grace to the building of this Kingdom." On 13 August 2002 American Catholic bishops issued a joint statement with leaders of Reform and Conservative Judaism, called "Reflections on Covenant and Mission", which affirmed that Christians should not target Jews for conversion. The document stated: "Jews already dwell in a saving covenant with God" and "Jews are also called by God to prepare the world for God's Kingdom." However, many Christian denominations still believe it is their duty to reach out to "unbelieving" Jews.

In December 2015, the Vatican released a 10,000-word document that, among other things, stated that Jews do not need to be converted to find salvation, and that Catholics should work with Jews to fight antisemitism.

==== Eastern Orthodox views ====
Eastern Orthodox Christianity emphasizes a continuing life of repentance or metanoia, which includes an increasing improvement in thought, belief and action. Regarding the salvation of Jews, Muslims, and other non-Christians, the Orthodox have traditionally taught that there is no salvation outside the church. Orthodoxy recognizes that other religions may contain truth, to the extent that they are in agreement with Christianity.

God is thought to be good, just, and merciful; it would not seem just to condemn someone because they never heard the Gospel message, or were taught a distorted version of the Gospel by heretics. Therefore, the reasoning goes, they must at some point have an opportunity to make a genuine informed decision. Ultimately, those who persist in rejecting God condemn themselves, by cutting themselves off from the ultimate source of all Life, and from the God who is Love embodied. Jews, Muslims, and members of other faiths, then, are expected to convert to Christianity in the afterlife.

=== Proselytizing ===
Judaism is not a proselytizing religion. Orthodox Judaism deliberately makes it very difficult to convert and become a Jew, and requires a significant and full-time effort in living, study, righteousness, and conduct over several years. The final decision is by no means a foregone conclusion. A person cannot become Jewish by marrying a Jew, or by joining a synagogue, nor by any degree of involvement in the community or religion, but only by explicitly undertaking intense, formal, and supervised work over years aimed towards that goal. Many progressive and liberal branches of Judaism have made this process somewhat easier, but it is still far from common.

In the past, scholars understood Judaism to have an evangelistic drive, but today's scholars are inclined to the view that it was often more akin just to "greater openness to converts" rather than active soliciting of conversions. Since Jews believe that one need not be a Jew to approach God, there is no religious pressure to convert non-Jews to their faith. Indeed, Scholars have revisited the traditional claims about Jewish proselytizing and have brought forward a variety of new insights. McKnight and Goodman have argued persuasively that a distinction ought to be made between the passive reception of converts or interested Pagans, and an active desire or intent to convert the non-Jewish world to Judaism.

The Chabad-Lubavitch branch of Hasidic Judaism has been an exception to this non-proselytizing standard, since in recent decades it has been actively promoting Noahide Laws for gentiles as an alternative to Christianity.

By contrast, Christianity is an explicitly evangelistic religion. Christians are commanded by Jesus to "Therefore, go and make disciples of all nations". Historically, evangelism has on rare occasions led to forced conversion under threat of death or mass expulsion.

== Mutual views ==
=== Common Jewish views of Christianity ===
Jews view Jesus as one in a long list of failed Jewish claimants to be the Messiah, none of whom fulfilled the tests of a prophet specified in the Law of Moses. Others see Jesus as a teacher who worked with the gentiles and ascribe the messianic claims that Jews find objectionable to his later followers. Because much physical and spiritual violence was done to Jews in the name of Jesus and his followers, and because evangelism is still an active aspect of many churches' activities, many Jews are uncomfortable with discussing Jesus and treat him as a non-person. In answering the question "What do Jews think of Jesus", philosopher Milton Steinberg claims, for Jews, Jesus cannot be accepted as anything more than a teacher. "In only a few respects did Jesus deviate from the Tradition," Steinberg concludes, "and in all of them, Jews believe, he blundered."

Judaism does not believe that God requires the sacrifice of any human. This is emphasized in Jewish traditions concerning the story of the Akedah, the binding of Isaac. In the Jewish explanation, this is a story in the Torah whereby God wanted to test Abraham's faith and willingness, and Isaac was never going to be actually sacrificed. Thus, Judaism rejects the notion that anyone can or should die for anyone else's sin. Judaism is more focused on the practicalities of understanding how one may live a sacred life in the world according to God's will, rather than a hope of a future one. Judaism does not believe in the Christian concept of hell but does have a punishment stage in the afterlife (i.e. Gehenna, a term that also appears in the New Testament and translated as hell) as well as a Heaven (Gan Eden), but the religion does not intend it as a focus.

Judaism views the worship of Jesus as inherently polytheistic, and rejects the Christian attempts to explain the Trinity as a complex monotheism. Christian festivals have no religious significance in Judaism and are not celebrated, but some secular Jews in the West treat Christmas as a secular holiday.

=== Common Christian views of Judaism ===
Christians believe that Christianity is the fulfillment and successor of Judaism, retaining much of its doctrine and many of its practices including monotheism, the belief in a Messiah, and certain forms of worship like prayer and reading from religious texts. Christians believe that Judaism requires blood sacrifice to atone for sins, and believe that Judaism has abandoned this since the destruction of the Second Temple. Most Christians consider the Mosaic Law to have been a necessary intermediate stage, but that once the crucifixion of Jesus occurred, adherence to civil and ceremonial Law was superseded by the New Covenant.

Some Christians, most notably certain Baptist and Reformed Baptist denominations, adhere to New Covenant theology, which states that with the arrival of his New Covenant, Jews have ceased being blessed under his Mosaic covenant. This position has been softened or disputed by other Christians, including Presbyterians and Dispensionalists, where Jews are recognized to have a special status under the Abrahamic covenant. New Covenant theology is thus in contrast to dual-covenant theology.

Some minor Christian groups, such as the Hebrew Roots movement, view the Jewish people as close to God as a way of understanding and incorporating elements of Jewish understanding or perspective into their beliefs to respect their "parent" religion of Judaism, or to more fully seek out and return to their Christian roots. Christians embracing aspects of Judaism are sometimes criticized as Biblical Judaizers by Christians when they pressure gentile Christians to observe Mosaic teachings rejected by most modern Christians.

Commonwealth Theology (CT) asserts that Judeo-Christian tensions were exacerbated in the fall of Jerusalem and by the subsequent Jewish Revolt. As a result, early Christian theologies formulated in the Roman capitals of Rome and Constantinople began to include antisemitic attitudes, which have been carried forward and embraced by the Protestant Reformers. Dispensation Theology, formalized in the 1830s by John Darby, holds that "God has not rejected His people whom He foreknew." Dispensationalism, however, maintains that God's special dealings with Israel have been interrupted by the Church Age. Commonwealth Theology, on the other hand, recognizes the continuity of God's "congregation in the wilderness" as presently consisting of the Jews (house of Judah) and the Nations (Gentiles), among whom are abiding the historically scattered Northern Kingdom (house of Israel). Commonwealth Theology views the Jews as already included in Commonwealth of Israel even while in unbelief, but nevertheless unsaved in their unbelieving state. CT recognizes that both the reconciliation of the Jewish house and the reconciliation of the estranged house of Israel (among the Gentiles) was accomplished by the cross; and that the salvation of "All Israel" is a process that began on the Day of Pentecost. The full realization of the "one new man" created through the peace (between the Jews and "you Gentiles") made by his cross will take place in Ezekiel's two sticks made one, when both houses of Israel will be united under the Kingdom of David.

=== Jewish Christians ===
Some scholars have found evidence of continuous interactions between Jewish-Christian and rabbinic movements from the mid- to late second century CE to the fourth century CE. Of particular importance is the figure of James the brother of Jesus, the leader of the Christian Church in Jerusalem until he was killed in the year 62, who was known for his righteous behavior as a Jew, and set the terms of the relationship between Jewish Christians and Gentile Christians in dialogue with Paul. To him is attributed a letter which emphasizes the view that faith must be expressed in works. The neglect of this mediating figure has often damaged Christian–Jewish relations. Modern scholarship is engaged in an ongoing debate over which term should be used as the proper designation for Jesus' first followers. Many scholars believe that the term Jewish Christians is anachronistic given the fact that there is no consensus on the date of the birth of Christianity. The very concepts of Christianity and Judaism can be seen as essentializing, since these are changing and plural traditions. Clearly, the first Christians would not have believed that they were exchanging one religion for another, because they believed that the resurrection of Jesus was the fulfillment of Jewish prophecies, and they believed that the mission to the gentiles which was initiated by Saul (Paul of Tarsus) was a secondary activity. Some modern scholars have suggested that the designations "Jewish believers in Jesus" and "Jewish followers of Jesus" better reflect the original context.

== Inter-faith relationship ==
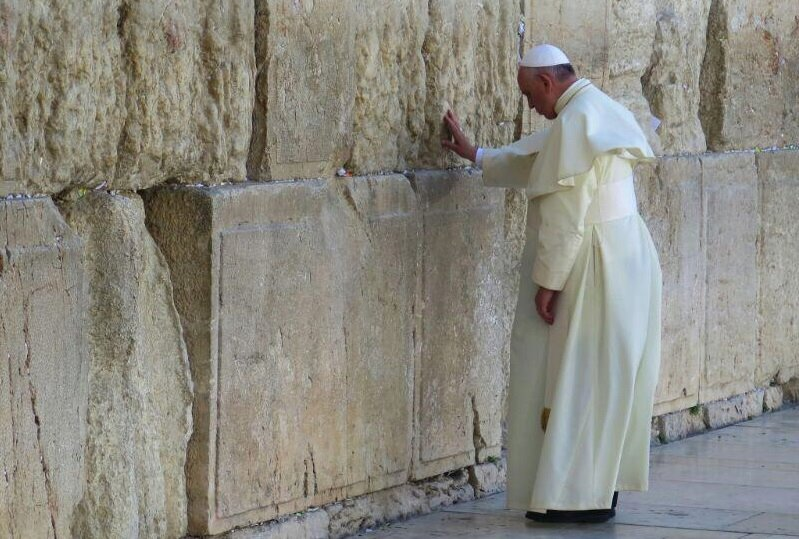
Pope Francis praying at the Western Wall in Jerusalem on his 2014 visit to the Holy Land

In addition to Christianity and Judaism's varying views on each other as religions, there has also been a long history of conflict, persecution and at times, tolerance, reconciliation, between the two religions, which have influenced their mutual views of their relationship with each other over time. Since the end of the Second World War and The Holocaust, Christianity has embarked on a process of introspection with regard to its Jewish roots and its attitudes toward Judaism. The eradication of the anti-Jewish tendencies is but one dimension of this ongoing Christian introspection, that attempts to engage a variety of legacies that disturb modern believers (Antisemitism, slavery, racial and ethnic prejudice, colonialism, sexism, homophobia and religious persecution).

According to Anna Sapir Abulafia, most scholars agree that Jews and Christians in Latin Christendom lived in relative peace with one another until the 13th century. Since the Middle Ages, the Catholic Church upheld Constitutio pro Judæis (Formal Statement on the Jews), which stated:

We decree that no Christian shall use violence to force them to be baptized, so long as they are unwilling and refuse. ... Without the judgment of the political authority of the land, no Christian shall presume to wound them or kill them or rob them of their money or change the good customs that they have thus far enjoyed in the place where they live.

Persecution, forcible conversion, and forcible displacement of Jews (i.e. hate crimes) occurred for many centuries, along with occasional gestures at reconciliation which also occurred from time to time. Pogroms were a common occurrence throughout Christian Europe, including organized violence, restrictions on land ownership and professional lives, forcible relocation and ghettoization, mandatory dress codes, and at times, humiliating actions and torture. All of these actions and restrictions had major effects on Jewish cultures. From the fifth century onward, Church councils imposed ever-increasing burdens and limitations on the Jews. Among the decrees:

- marriages between a Jew and a Christian were forbidden (Orleans, 533 and 538; Clermont, 535; Toledo, 589 and 633).
- Jews and Christians were forbidden to eat together (Vannes, 465; Agde, 506; Epaone, 517; Orleans, 538; Macon, 583; Clichy, 626–7)
- Jews were banned from public office (Clermont, 535; Toledo, 589; Paris, 614–5; Clichy, 626–7; Toledo, 633).
- Jews were forbidden to appear in public during Easter (Orleans, 538; Macon, 583) and to work on Sunday (Narbonne, 589).

By the end of the first millennium, the Jewish population in the Christian lands had been decimated, expelled, forced into conversion or worse. Only a few small and scattered communities survived. Another such historian is Ivan Marcus. The section of his book Cultures of the Jews, "Jewish-Christian Symbiosis" deals with the relationship between Christians and Ashkenazi Jews. Marcus claims that the time is written off as a time of intolerance against Jews living in Europe. For Marcus times of persecution were rarities and few and far between. The two communities lived amongst each other and interacted socially on an everyday basis. They interacted at such a personal level both Christian and Jewish leaders thought that the other group would heavily influence their respective faiths. When persecution did occur however it was only the more drastic measures that stopped the close interactions between the two groups. Had the intense violence described in other sources been the standard for living condition of the Askkenazi Jews then they would not have survived the era let alone their culture which is the roots for many Jews today.

There have also been non-coercive outreach and missionary efforts such as the Church of England's Ministry Among Jewish People, founded in 1809.

For Martin Buber, Judaism and Christianity were variations on the same theme of messianism. Buber made this theme the basis of a famous definition of the tension between Judaism and Christianity:

Pre-messianically, our destinies are divided. Now to the Christian, the Jew is the incomprehensibly obdurate man who declines to see what has happened; and to the Jew, the Christian is the incomprehensibly daring man who affirms in an unredeemed world that its redemption has been accomplished. This is a gulf which no human power can bridge.

The Nazi Party was known for its persecution of Christian Churches; many of them, such as the Protestant Confessing Church and the Catholic Church, as well as Quakers and Jehovah's Witnesses, aided and rescued Jews who were being targeted by the régime.

Following the Holocaust, attempts have been made to construct a new Jewish-Christian relationship of mutual respect for differences, through the inauguration of the interfaith body the Council of Christians and Jews in 1942 and International Council of Christians and Jews. The Seelisberg Conference in 1947 established 10 points relating to the sources of Christian antisemitism. The ICCJ's "Twelve points of Berlin" sixty years later aim to reflect a recommitment to interreligious dialogue between the two communities.

Pope Paul VI wrote that "the Jewish people, who still retain the religion of the Old Testament, ... are indeed worthy of our respect and love". Pope John Paul II and the Catholic Church have "upheld the Church's acceptance of the continuing and permanent election of the Jewish people" as well as a reaffirmation of the covenant between God and the Jews. In December 2015, the Vatican released a 10,000-word document which, among other things, stated that Catholics should work with Jews to fight antisemitism.

=== Orthodox Rabbinic Statement on Christianity ===
In 2012, the book Kosher Jesus by Orthodox Rabbi Shmuley Boteach was published. In it, he takes the position that Jesus was a wise and learned Torah-observant Jewish rabbi. Boteach says he was a beloved member of the Jewish community. At the same time, Jesus is said to have despised the Romans for their cruelty, and fought them courageously. The book states that the Jews had nothing whatsoever to do with the murder of Jesus, but rather that blame for his trial and killing lies with the Romans and Pontius Pilate. Boteach states clearly that he does not believe in Jesus as the Jewish Messiah. At the same time, Boteach argues that "Jews have much to learn from Jesus—and from Christianity as a whole—without accepting Jesus' divinity. There are many reasons for accepting Jesus as a man of great wisdom, beautiful ethical teachings, and profound Jewish patriotism." He concludes by writing, as to Judeo-Christian values, that "the hyphen between Jewish and Christian values is Jesus himself."

On 3 December 2015, the Center for Jewish–Christian Understanding and Cooperation (CJCUC) spearheaded a petition of Orthodox rabbis from around the world calling for increased partnership between Jews and Christians. The unprecedented Orthodox Rabbinic Statement on Christianity, entitled "To Do the Will of Our Father in Heaven: Toward a Partnership between Jews and Christians", was initially signed by over 25 prominent Orthodox rabbis in Israel, the United States, and Europe, and as of 2016 had over 60 signatories.

=== Between Jerusalem and Rome ===
On 31 August 2017, representatives of the Conference of European Rabbis, the Rabbinical Council of America, and the Commission of the Chief Rabbinate of Israel issued and presented the Holy See with a statement entitled Between Jerusalem and Rome. The document pays particular tribute to the Second Vatican Council's Declaration Nostra Aetate, whose fourth chapter represents the "Magna Carta" of the Holy See's dialogue with the Jewish world. The Statement Between Jerusalem and Rome does not hide the theological differences that exist between the two faith traditions while all the same it expresses a firm resolve to collaborate more closely, now and in the future.

== See also ==
- Anabaptist–Jewish relations
- Antisemitism in Christianity
- Christianity and other religions
- Christian–Jewish reconciliation
- Christian Zionism
- Jesus in Christianity
- Roman Catholicism and Judaism
- Judaism and Mormonism
- Protestantism and Judaism
