= Commonwealth Theology =

Christian theology

Christianity
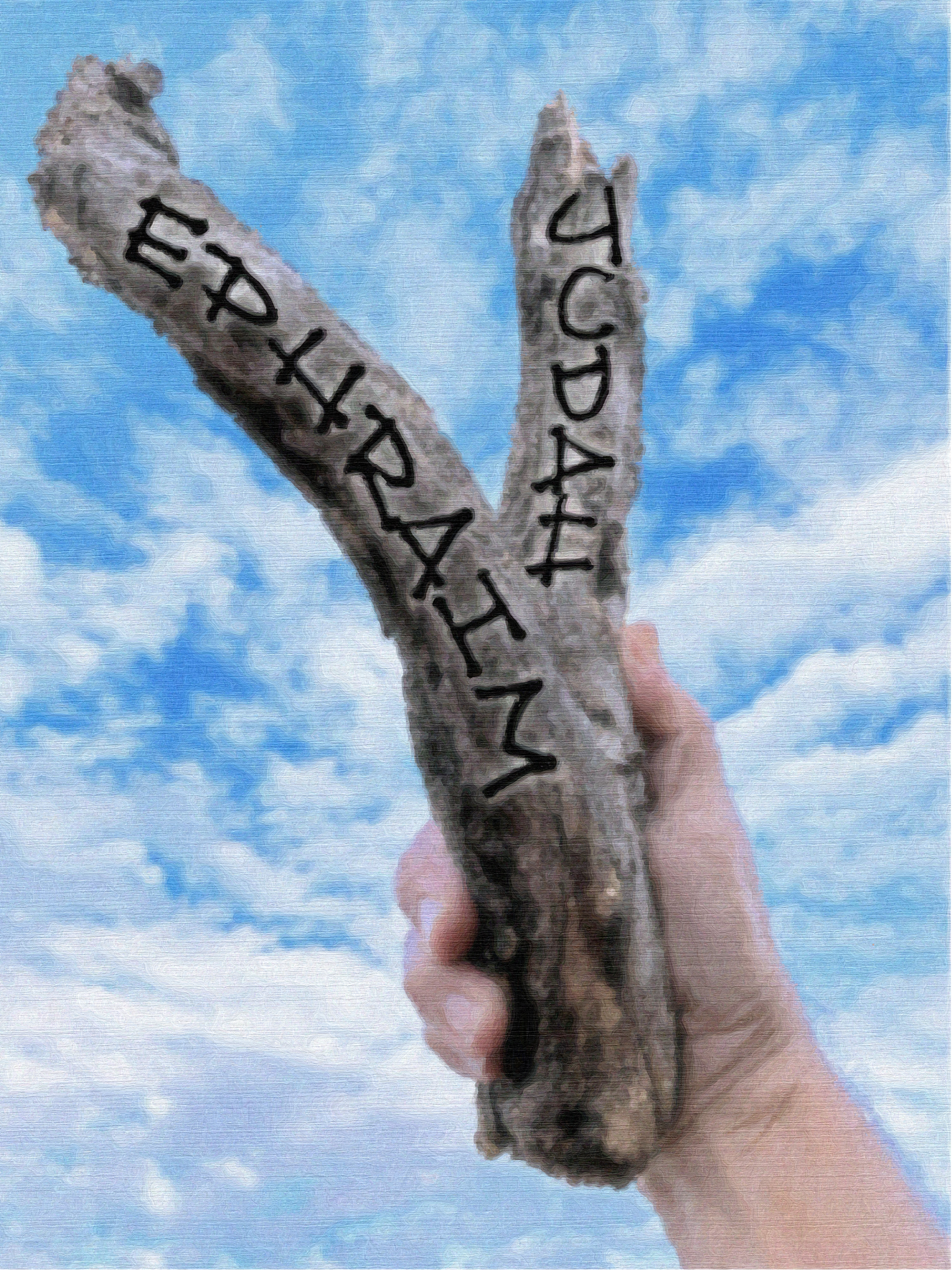
- Ezekiel 37 Two Sticks prophecy

Scriptures
- Bible, TaNaKh
- Yes Distinction. No Separation.

Commonwealth Theology describes itself as a consolidation of mainstream Christian theologies that better conforms the relationship between the Christian Church and today's Israel to the relationship prophesied in the Old Testament and confirmed by the writings of the Apostolic Age Church. Commonwealth Theology derives its name from the Commonwealth of Israel (Eph. 2:12), which describes a commonwealth inhabited by "one new man." This corporate body with its citizens is understood to represent both a present reality achieved by Christ's atoning sacrifice and a yet-to-be-realized future united community of believers, known as the Commonwealth of Israel, who hail the Jewish House (Judah). From the House of Joseph—i.e., Ephraim (a/k/a Jezreel, Samaria, Israel)— the Ten Lost Tribes" were swallowed up" by the nations/Gentiles (Hosea 8:7-9), bringing the "rest of mankind" (Acts 15:17) with them into the United Kingdom of David.

Similar to previous Two House theologies, Commonwealth Theology looks to the Ezekiel 37 prophecy of the two sticks made one as the ultimate fulfillment upon which God "will take the children of Israel from among the nations, wherever they have gone, and will gather them from every side and bring them into their land; and I will make them one nation in the land, on the mountains of Israel; and one king shall be king over them all; they shall no longer be two nations, nor shall they ever be divided into two kingdoms again" (Ezek. 37:21–22 NKJV).

== Israel and the Church ==
Advocates of Commonwealth Theology distinguish their position on the Church and the Jews from Supersessionism (Replacement Theology) and Dispensationalism with the phrase, "Yes Distinction; No Separation." The Commonwealth Theology view is that Replacement Theology makes no distinction and no separation between the Church and the Jews based on Supersessionism's premise that the Church has subsumed the legacy of Old Testament Israel to become today, in totality, the "Israel of God" (Gal. 6:16), wherein at the cross the Jews were disinherited, with all promises and covenants made to them forfeited as a result of the New Covenant inaugurated by Jesus. As the Jews rejected Jesus, Jesus, through the Church, has rejected the Jews.

Dispensationalism makes a distinction between the Church and the Jews but separates them:two ages, two gospels, two brides. The notion that the Jews are a "this-worldly" people and the Christians an "other-worldly" people is another form of separation that is antithetical from Commonwealth of Israel Theology, which asserts that the Church and the Jews remain distinct, as represented by the 12 gates bearing the names of the 12 Tribes of Israel (Rev. 21:12) and the foundations of the Holy City bearing the names of the 12 apostles of the Lamb (Rev. 21:14)—One Holy City (Rev. 21:2), Two Branches yet One Olive Tree/Root (Rom. 11:16–24); Two Houses, yet One Prince (Isa. 9:6), One King David shall reign over them both (Ezek. 37). Commonwealth Theology acknowledges the difference between the "believers among the nations" (gentiles) and the Jews in the same manner, as Paul stated, "there is neither male nor female (Gal. 3:28)," not a separate species but still recognizably distinct.

== Commonwealth Theology vs. Messianic Judaism ==
Proponents of Commonwealth Theology distinguish themselves from previous Messianic Two-House theologies, which have promoted the doctrine that traceable ancestry is required to show descent from the House of Israel. Commonwealth Theology advocates also distance themselves from prior Ephraimite (Lost Tribes) cultic practices (e.g., Mormonism, Armstrongism, British Israelism) that have insinuated superiority and tend to be suspect by mainline evangelicalism. Commonwealth Theology avoids these controversies by taking the Scripture literally that the House of Israel was "swallowed up...among the nations" so that the Lost Tribes of the Northern Kingdom and the gentiles remain somewhat indistinguishable as a "mixed multitude" (Exod. 12:38). Commonwealth Theology upholds the traditional Christian emphasis on faith (adoption by faith into the rights of inheritance) while respecting those of traceable genetic descent. Nevertheless, the Bible prophesied the "New Covenant with the House of Israel and with the House of Judah" (Jer. 31:31) but also included the gentiles: "I will also give you as a light to the gentiles" (Isa. 49:6). See also Rom. 15:8–9; Eph. 2:22.

== Two-House Theology ==
=== Objections ===
Some among the Messianic community, such as TorahResource, have initially distanced themselves from the two-house aspect of Commonwealth Theology (see video: "The Two House Theory.") In response, proponents have asserted a fundamental misunderstanding of the nature of Ephraim and Edom—"the rest of mankind." Advocates of Commonwealth Theology note that both traditional ethnic Jews and Messianic Jews are reticent to allow gentiles to be identified with Ephraim (a/k/a the Lost Tribes/House of Israel), although they allow gentile believers in Yeshua to identify outwardly as Jews regarding feast days, dress, diet, Torah, etc. Messianic Jews tend to include the rest of the ten tribes, making them all Jews, whereas these Ten Tribes of Israel were swallowed up among the nations (Hosea 8:7–9); given a writ of divorce (Jer. 3:8); and become Lo-Ami—no longer His beloved, "for you are not My people, and I will not be your God"—Hosea 1:9; and "made nigh" by the blood of the everlasting covenant in Christ Jesus although far off (Eph. 2:13, 17; Heb. 13:20).

Two-House Theology and the notion that the Church is the reconstituted House of Israel have both been challenged by John J. Parsons in his article "Two House Theology: Are Christians the 'Lost Tribes' of Israel?" Parsons articulates his understanding of the two-house system as well as the intuitive conclusion of Commonwealth Theology, that by faith, the Gentile Church has been adopted/grafted in as the bona fide House of Israel. After questioning the relevance of the Bible's two-house narrative to traditional Christian theology, the article concludes with skepticism as to whether a Christian's identification with ethnic Israel could enhance a believer's "daily walk of faith." Without considering the impact of Commonwealth Theology and Two-House Theology on present-day relations between Christians and Jews, Parsons concedes the potential benefits of "identifying with Israel and her destiny," a "sense of belonging and inheritance," and a "deeper appreciation for God's sovereign plans for the nation of Israel."

=== Significance ===
Deportation of the Northern Kingdom of Israel by the Assyrian Empire: Assyrian captivity

Commonwealth Theology theologians point out that the New Covenant of Jeremiah 31:31 is a direct response to the Breach of Jeroboam and the resulting desolation of the land brought about by the sins of both houses divided kingdom.

The Commonwealth of Israel, mentioned in Ephesians Ch. 2, is composed of those near and those far, which, according to Commonwealth Theology, alludes to the House of Judah and the House of Israel, respectively. The near/far connection is substantiated by the fact that this same language was used in the Book of Daniel, associating "near" with Judah and "far" with those driven (scattered), that is, "Israel": "O Lord, righteousness belongs to You, but us the shame of face, as it is this day—to the men of Judah, to the inhabitants of Jerusalem and all Israel, those near and those far off in all the countries to which You have driven them, because of the unfaithfulness which they have committed against You" (Dan. 9:7). (See "Assyrian captivity"). The House of Israel remained scattered at the time Second Kings was written—"there was none left but the tribe of Judah alone...So Israel was carried away from their land to Assyria, as it is to this day (Cir. 550 BC.)" (2 Kings 17:18–23)–and the Northern Tribes were scattered at the time of the writing of Daniel.

The diaspora of the House of Israel among the nations (gentiles) resulted in the partial fulfillment of Hosea's prophecy: "For I will no longer have mercy on the house of Israel, but I will utterly take them away." "Yet the number of the children of Israel shall be as the sand of the sea, which cannot be measured or numbered." "Then the children of Judah and the children of Israel shall be gathered together..." (Hos. 1:6,10,11). Commonwealth Theology addresses the mystery of how the Northern Kingdom (Ephraim) could be scattered, "lost," "mixed with the peoples," "not a people," and yet could re-assume its identity and be reunited with Judah, whereas mainline Christian theologies either assess the Bible's many references to the two houses as trivial information or else suppose that the Northern Kingdom had already reassembled before the time of Christ. At issue is the relationship between the Church and the Jews due to Christ's first coming and a fuller understanding of the gathering at Christ's second coming.

=== The Two Houses and the marriage covenant ===
Commonwealth theologians propose that Paul's reference to the institution of marriage as representing Christ and the Church (Eph. 5:32) points to Old Testament allusions to God's divorce and remarriage with Israel; for instance, the New Covenant passage in Jeremiah 31, "though I [God] was a husband to them."

In the third chapter of One in Messiah, Douglas Hamp points to other verses that speak of God's divorce and provision for future reunification, as well as mentioning the Old Testament stipulation prohibiting return to a former spouse after unfaithfulness. "Then her former husband [Yahweh] who divorced her [Israel] must not take her [Israel] back to be his wife after she has been defiled; for that is an abomination before Yahweh." (Deut. 24:4a). Hamp suggests that the death and resurrection of Yeshua resolved the legal dilemma so that a new marriage covenant could be established between the same parties. Hamp also maintains a difference between the Law of the Marriage Covenant and God's instructions (the Law–Torah) that was also given at Mount Sinai.

== Law and Grace ==
Commonwealth Theology does not view Law and Grace to be mutually exclusive "dispensations" of God's work among humankind. Commonwealth Theology asserts the word Law (Torah) in the Old Testament means "God's instructions," which continue to be good and beneficial (Rom. 7:12; 1 Tim. 1:8). Commonwealth theologians reject the interpretation that the Law has been done away with and view such a doctrine as a dangerous and slippery slope that has led Western societies to distance themselves from the Ten Commandments and propelled the Church toward the anomie of the evangelical left.

=== Observance of the Law ===
Despite their opposition to lawlessness, promoters of Commonwealth Theology hold differing opinions on how and to what extent the Old Testament laws are observed. This ambiguity stems from the fact that the movement includes Torah-observant Messianic-style members (such as The Way Congregation) and evangelical Christian affiliates (One Body Life). Nevertheless, these divergences are negotiated among these groups by recognizing the New Testament's dual mandate regarding keeping "the Law." (documented as follows by Commonwealth Theology proponents Douglas Hamp and C. W. Steinle):

On the one hand: Speaking against those who choose to observe the Law is discouraged by Jesus' directive: "Whoever therefore breaks one of the least of these commandments, and teaches men so, shall be called least in the kingdom of heaven; but whoever does and teaches them, he shall be called great in the kingdom of heaven." (Matthew 5:19). On the other hand: Romans Ch. 14 discourages judging how Christ's servants keep the law: "Who are you to judge another's servant?... One person esteems one day above another; another esteems every day alike. Let each be fully convinced in his own mind. He who observes the day, observes it to the Lord; and he who does not observe the day, to the Lord he does not observe it. He who eats, eats to the Lord, for he gives God thanks; and he who does not eat, to the Lord he does not eat, and gives God thanks...Do you have faith? Have it to yourself before God." (Excerpts Rom. 14:4-22a) Traditional (modern) Christians within Commonwealth Theology adjudge that the Law was fulfilled in Christ—the Law of Christ—and that it is holy and undefiled. Furthermore, the Law was given as our schoolmaster to bring us to Messiah (Gal. 3:24). Something that brings one to the Messiah cannot be onerous or unsanctified. Commonwealth Theology teaches grace to those from among the nations (gentiles) and the Jewish brethren. It affirms the followers of Messiah who are pleasing to Him who have the "commandments of God" but "have the testimony of Jesus" (Rev. 12:17); who "sing the Song of Moses, the servant of God and the Song of the Lamb" (Rev. 15:3).

=== The Breach of Jeroboam ===
Approximate map showing the Kingdoms of Israel (blue) and Judah (orange) in the 9th century BCE.

Based on the biblical and historical record of the Northern Kingdom being swallowed up by the nations (see above), Commonwealth Theology tends to treat the House of Israel and the Gentile Church somewhat homogeneously. This "mixed multitude" then becomes an archetype of rebellion from authority traceable back to Jeroboam's revolt against the Davidic rule of the House of Judah. This "Breach of Jeroboam" is seen by some to be at the root of the Law vs. Grace dichotomy that has recently surfaced in Western Christian thought.

== Previous Commonwealth-of-Israel type organizations ==
Below is a summary of individuals and organizations that have previously concluded that non-Jews might form part of the Ten Tribes:

Yair Davidiy, founder of Britam and author of The Tribes was one of the first to link non-Jews and the Lost Tribes in modern times and has done extensive research on the subject.

Avraham Feld, co-founder of Kol HaTor with OvadYah Avrahami of South Africa, recognized that the Ten Tribes were widely populated by Europeans. Feld and Avrahami (of Judah), along with Stephen Spykerman (of Ephraim) and others, helped to found the Commonwealth of Israel reconciliation effort in the belief that Ephraim's reconciliation with Judah would occur according to the existing halacha—i.e., by conversion to Judaism.

Harry Rozenberg's launch of LostTribes.education and Stat Academy with basketball notable Amar'e Stoudemire aimed to reach many of the lesser-known groups who for generations have maintained a tradition of descent from the Lost Tribes or maintained practices showing such a connection and who wish reconciliation with Israel. Rozenberg and Stoudemire's solution is to help such groups "become Israel" right where they are.

Hanoch Young, co-founder of United 2 Restore, made outreach to existing Ephraimite groups in the United States.

Gidon Ariel and Bob O'dell co-founded Root Source to bring the online relationship between Christians and Jews to center on the Tanakh—the entire collection of Jewish scriptures including the Torah, the Prophets, and the Writings—as the root source of their shared faiths.

Other examples include Yeshiva for the Nations, co-founded by Donna Jollay and Tuly Weisz, and Ten from the Nations, founded by Rivkah Adler.

A hybrid approach has been taken by David Katz, as detailed in his book The World of the Ger, in the belief that non-Jews will begin to come alongside Israel as sojourners (ger), with the requirement that they renounce belief in Yeshua as the Messiah and the Trinity but not full Torah adherence. More stories of Jews and non-Jews meeting through Torah study can be found in Rivkah Adler's book, Ten from the Nations.

== The theological approach to peace ==
Commonwealth Theology endeavors to build on previous reconciliation efforts by offering a complete and systematic theology that more accurately portrays the relationship between Christ's Ecclesia (Congregation) and the saints of old (Congregation in the wilderness). Development and codification of the Commonwealth Theology system have heretofore been represented by Douglas Krieger's initial work Commonwealth Theology; the website, commonwealththeology.com; a non-profit organization engaged in the production of a Commonwealth of Israel reference Bible; and most recently, the Denver Declaration–a formal statement of the essential assertions of Commonwealth Theology.

Advocates of Commonwealth Theology hope to engage Christians and Jews by appealing to the synthesis between the sacred texts revered by both faiths. As noted in the Mission Statement of the Commonwealth of Israel Foundation: "The supernatural concept of "Divine Deliverance"–of "Messiah," the "Deliverer," "Savior"–is embedded in Hebraic and Christian Scriptures and is espoused by both Jewish and Christian theologies."
