= Commonwealth of Israel =

English translation of ancient Greek text

Commonwealth of Israel is the English translation of the Greek πολιτείας του ισραηλ (politeias tou Israēl) mentioned in Ephesians 2:12 in the New Testament. The context of the surrounding verses, Ephesians 2:11-13, implies the uniting of Gentiles with Jews, who had historically been God's heritage, and the object of God's promises:

11 Therefore remember that you, once Gentiles in the flesh—who are called Uncircumcision by what is called the Circumcision made in the flesh by hands— 12 that at that time you were without Christ, being aliens from the commonwealth of Israel and strangers from the covenants of promise, having no hope and without God in the world. 13 But now in Christ Jesus you who once were far off have been brought near by the blood of Christ. (NKJV)

Advocates of Two House theology see in Joseph's blessing over Ephraim and Manasseh evidence that the ten tribes of the Kingdom of Israel became a "multitude of nations". Commonwealth Theology observes many other Bible verses that predict and affirm that the House of Israel was "scattered", swallowed up", and "not a people". This theology takes the view that the Gentiles (nations) "brought near by the blood of Christ" may be indistinguishable from the genetic descendants of the Lost Tribes and identical to the "believers scattered among the nations" (the Church). This connection between the dispersed tribes of Israel and the Gentiles would appear to be substantiated by John 7:35: "Then said the Jews among themselves, Whither will he go, that we shall not find him? will he go unto the dispersed among the Gentiles, and teach the Gentiles?" (KJV)

The Commonwealth Theology position that the Commonwealth of Israel denotes more than merely a restored/united Kingdom of Israel is further substantiated by the verses in Ephesians Ch. 2 which follow Paul's reference to the commonwealth. "For He Himself is our peace, who has made both one, and has broken down the middle wall of separation, having abolished in His flesh the enmity, that is, the law of commandments contained in ordinances, so as to create in Himself one new man from the two, thus making peace, and that He might reconcile them both to God in one body through the cross, thereby putting to death the enmity. And He came and preached peace to you who were afar off and to those who were near. 18 For through Him we both have access by one Spirit to the Father" (Eph. 2:14-18).

"One new man" implies something that did not previously exist, something unique and apart from the United Kingdom under King David and Solomon. In addition, the antecedents of "we both" refer to the Gentiles who were alienated, strangers, far off, and the recipient of the promises which would include both houses of the Divided Kingdom. Once again, this added element of the Gentiles exceeds the original Kingdom consisting only of the Children of Israel and fulfills the prophecy of Isaiah 49:8:

Thus says the Lord:

"In an acceptable time I have heard You, And in the day of salvation I have helped You; I will preserve You and give You As a covenant to the people, To restore the earth,

To cause them to inherit the desolate heritages;"
