= Ephesians 2 =

- ← chapter 1 chapter 3 →
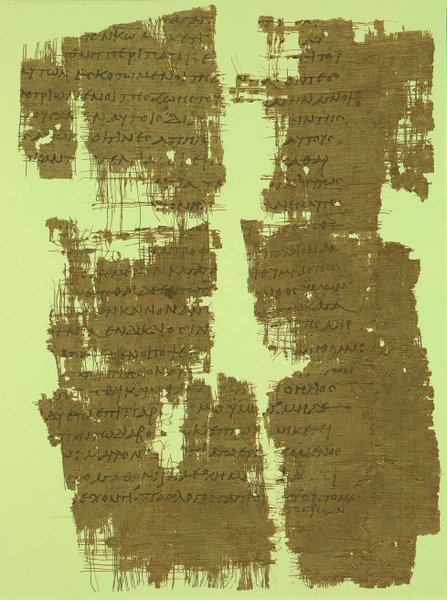
- A fragment showing Ephesians 4:16-29 on recto side of Papyrus 49 from the third century.
- Book: Epistle to the Ephesians
- Category: Pauline epistles
- Christian Bible part: New Testament
- Order in the Christian part: 10

Ephesians 2 is the second chapter of the Epistle to the Ephesians in the New Testament of the Christian Bible. Traditionally, it is believed to have been written by Apostle Paul while he was in prison in Rome (around AD 62), but more recently it has been suggested that it was written between AD 80 and 100 by another writer using Paul's name and style.

The 1599 Geneva Bible summarises the contents of this chapter:

The better to set out the grace of Christ, he (Paul) useth a comparison, calling them to mind, that they were altogether castaways and aliants, that they are saved by grace, and brought near, by reconciliation through Christ, published by the Gospel.

This chapter contains the well-known verse "For it is by grace you have been saved, through faith: and this is not from yourselves, it is the gift of God".

== Text ==
The original text was written in Koine Greek. This chapter is divided into 22 verses.

=== Textual witnesses ===
Some early manuscripts containing the text of this chapter are:

- Papyrus 46 (~AD 200)
- Codex Vaticanus (325-350)
- Codex Sinaiticus (330-360)
- Codex Alexandrinus (400-440)
- Codex Ephraemi Rescriptus (~450; extant verses 19-22)
- Codex Freerianus (~450; extant verses 15-18)
- Codex Claromontanus (~550)

== Reminder of God's Grace (verses 1–10) ==
According to theologian James Dunn, this section contains "one of the most forceful statements in the Bible" about the human condition when separated from God's grace and the work of God's grace for salvation.

=== Verse 1 ===
And you He made alive, who were dead in trespasses and sin.

"And you hath he quickened …" in the King James Version. The verb is missing from the text, supplied by inference from verse 5 ("[he] made us alive"). Some translations decline to add a form of words on mankind being made alive: the New Revised Standard Version, for example, reads:

You were dead through the trespasses and sins in which you once lived.

=== Verse 2 ===
... you once walked according to the course of this world, according to the prince of the power of the air, the spirit who now works in the sons of disobedience.

The metaphor, "the prince of the power of the air" or "the ruler of the power of the air", is not used elsewhere in the New Testament.

- "Prince of the power of the air?" in Mark 4: "The birds fly over the air. They have control over the air." The Bible says Satan is likened to that. So, the atmosphere is Satan’s domain and territory.

Mark 4:4: "And it came to pass, as he sowed, some fell by the way side, and the fowls of the air came and devoured it up."

=== Verse 3 ===
...among whom also we all once conducted ourselves in the lusts of our flesh, fulfilling the desires of the flesh and of the mind, and were by nature children of wrath, just as the others.

The verse describes that before being saved, converts were just as bad as those outside the faith - that they gave in to their baser thoughts and impulses.

There is debate about the phrase "children of wrath". Some writers indicate that it refers to original sin, in which God was angered by Adam and Eve for disobeying him. Others believe it refers to the descendants of Cain, who slew Abel in his anger and brought murder into the world.

=== Verse 8 ===
For by grace you have been saved through faith, and that not of yourselves; it is the gift of God,

- "Gift of God": emphasizing that salvation is completely and solely a 'gift'.

=== Verse 9 ===
... not of works, lest anyone should boast.

- "Works" here means 'any product of human effort'.

=== Verse 10 ===
For we are His workmanship, created in Christ Jesus for good works, which God prepared beforehand that we should walk in them.

- "His workmanship": Not only as human beings, but also as Christians, new creatures; pertaining to the persons described in Ephesians 2:1-3 and include both Jews and Gentiles.
- "Created in Christ Jesus for good works": the grace of God is an act of creation, that is, an infusion of new creatures, which are created in Christ. A person who has become a new creature, is visibly in Christ, ready to perform good works.
- "God prepared beforehand" (KJV: "God has before ordained") or has "before prepared": the preparation of good works to be performed by believers, and the preparation of the believers for performing the works, both are from the Lord. God has appointed good works to be done by his people, but the intention is not that they should be saved by them, but that they should walk in them; and this being God's pre-ordination, as it shows that predestination is not according to good works, since good works are the effects of it.

== The new humanity (verses 11–22) ==
This is another review of the believer's transition from the past life to the "new humanity" (verse 15), from the perspective of the saving work of God through Israel which is now open to all through Christ.

=== Verses 11-12 ===
11 Therefore remember that you, once Gentiles in the flesh—who are called Uncircumcision by what is called the Circumcision made in the flesh by hands— 12 that at that time you were without Christ, being aliens from the commonwealth of Israel and strangers from the covenants of promise, having no hope and without God in the world.

=== Verse 13 ===
But now in Christ Jesus you who once were far off have been brought near by the blood of Christ.

The image of the gentiles as being "far off" and "brought near" is also used in the Acts of the Apostles, where Peter speaks to the Pentecost crowds in Jerusalem saying:

The promise is to you (Jews) and to your children, and to all who are afar off.

The Cambridge Bible for Schools and Colleges notes that "nigh" and "far" were also familiar rabbinical terms in the sense of having or not having part in the covenant. "Johann Jakob Wettstein on this verse quotes, 'inter alia', the following from the Talmud:

A woman came to Rabbi Eliezer, to be made a proselyte; saying to him, "Rabbi, make me nigh". He refused her, and she went to Rabbi Joshua, who received her. The scholars of Rabbi Joshua therefore said, "Did R. Eliezer put her far off, and dost thou make her nigh?"

=== Verses 14–16 ===
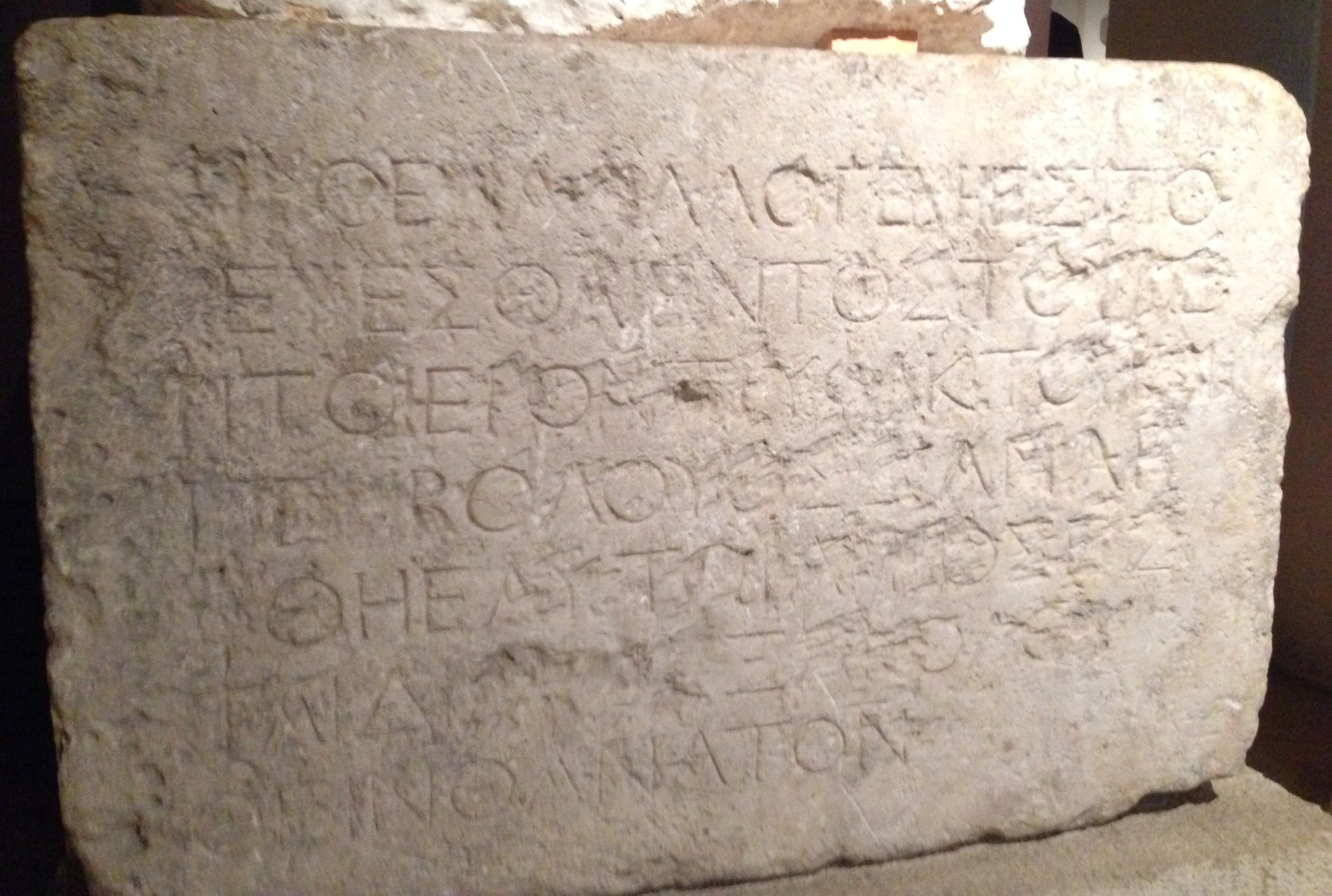
The Temple Warning inscription in the Second Temple in Jerusalem marked a wall beyond which Gentiles were not allowed to enter under penalty of death.

^{14}For He Himself is our peace, who has made both one, and has broken down the middle wall of separation, ^{15}having abolished in His flesh the enmity, that is, the law of commandments contained in ordinances, so as to create in Himself one new man from the two, thus making peace, ^{16}and that He might reconcile them both to God in one body through the cross, thereby putting to death the enmity.

- "[He has] created in Himself one new man from the two": Lutheran theologian George Stoeckhardt argues that "the Christian Church is de facto the one new man formed from Jews and Gentiles in whom there is neither Jew nor Greek".

=== Verses 19–22 ===
^{19} Now, therefore, you are no longer strangers and foreigners, but are fellow citizens with the saints and members of the household of God, ^{20} having been built upon the foundation of the apostles and prophets, Jesus Christ Himself being the chief cornerstone, ^{21} in whom the entire building, tightly framed together, grows into a holy temple in the Lord, ^{22} in whom you also are being built together into a dwelling place of God through the Spirit.

- "Cornerstone" (Greek: ἀκρογωνιαῖος, akrogōniaiou; cf. Hebrew: אֶבֶן פִּנַּ֤ת, ’ā-ḇen pinaṯ in Isaiah 28:16) is also applied to Jesus Christ in 1 Peter 2:6 (cf. Romans 9:33).

== See also ==
- Holy Spirit
- Jesus Christ
- Knowledge of Christ
- Related Bible parts: Isaiah 2, Isaiah 28, Romans 8, 2 Corinthians 1, 1 Peter 2

== Bibliography ==
- Dunn, J. D. G. (2007). "68. Ephesians". In Barton, John; Muddiman, John (eds.). The Oxford Bible Commentary (first (paperback) ed.). Oxford University Press. pp. 1165–1179. ISBN 978-0199277186.
