= Two House theology =

Division of the United Monarchy of Israel into the kingdoms of Israel and Judah

Two House theology primarily focuses on the division of the ancient United Monarchy of Israel into two kingdoms, Israel and Judah. Two House theology raises questions when applied to modern peoples who are thought to be descendants of the two ancient kingdoms, both Jews (of the Kingdom of Judah) and the ten lost tribes of the Kingdom of Israel. The phrase "the two houses of Israel" is found in the Book of Isaiah (Isaiah 8:14).

== Brief history ==
According to Biblical narrative, the United Monarchy of Israel became divided after King Solomon's reign passed to his son Rehoboam in about 931 BCE. Rehoboam refused to grant the northern ten tribes relief from Solomon's taxation and they subsequently formed their own autonomous nation in the north, making Jeroboam their king. The Kingdom of Israel (the Ten Lost Tribes) was taken into Assyrian captivity starting in 740 BCE, culminating with the seizure of Samaria in 721 BCE. Even after invitations to return, many years later, no large representation of the tribes ever returned to their former boundaries.

Between 597 and 586 BCE, the Kingdom of Judah was taken into the Babylonian captivity. Cyrus the Great later granted the Judeans permission to return to their lands, which they did, but the Jewish–Roman wars took a significant toll which included the 70 CE destruction of the Second Temple and exile from Jerusalem (except for the day of Tisha B'Av) and the renaming of Roman Judaea to Syria Palaestina.

== Advocates ==
Advocates take the general position that the ten tribes of the Kingdom of Israel have become a multitude of nations since their exile by the Assyrian Empire (740–722 BCE) and lengthy migrations before and particularly after the decline of the Parthian Empire, 200–700 CE (also known as the Great Migration Period).

It is believed by proponents of Commonwealth Theology that the ten tribes are not yet rejoined to the Kingdom of Judah in any large representation. 2 Kings (written circa 550 BCE) indicated that the northern tribes had not returned 170 years after they were scattered and were "swallowed up by the nations".

== Opponents ==
Some opponents, such as the Association of Messianic Congregations, claim that the lost tribes reunited with the Kingdom of Judah in the years leading up to and following Judah's return from the Babylonian captivity in 537 BCE. Hence, they argue that these tribes do not exist in the nations today save in the form of the Jews—those scattered in the wake of the Temple's 70 CE destruction and subsequent exiles by Christian and Muslim rulers in later periods. Other opponents claim that the lost tribes have been completely assimilated and unidentifiable in the nations of the world and hence could never have returned from their deportation by and into Assyria.

Opposition may arise when Israelites are associated with individuals more commonly linked to Japheth, one of Noah's three sons, as well. Some Two House advocates consider Genesis 9:27 without denying certain aspects of this argument. Shem, another son of Noah traditionally considered an ancestor of the Hebrews and Arabs, is mentioned in genealogies found in the Hebrew Bible.

Three major Messianic Jewish groups—the Union of Messianic Jewish Congregations, the Messianic Jewish Association of America (an affiliate of the International Messianic Jewish Alliance), and the Messianic Bureau International—all hold similar views on Two House theology. Some within these groups consider it misguided; others go as far as describing it as, at worst, a gentile cult attempting to present as Jewish. These organizations maintain that the Messianic movement primarily caters to Jews who believe Jesus of Nazareth (whom Messianics Jews refer to as Yeshua; Hebrew: יֵשׁוּעַ) was the messiah and strictly discourage the teaching that gentiles should be considered as the lost tribes of Israel. This difference in perspectives is notably observed in discussions surrounding the “Ephraimite Error.” These attitudes may be a reaction to British Israelism, a pseudo-religious belief best epitomized by the Worldwide Church of God's founder, Herbert W. Armstrong.

== Earliest dispute ==
The earliest documentation of the dispute can be found in discussions taking place sometime during the 2nd century CE. The Mishnah records Rabbi Akiva and Rabbi Eliezar disagreeing on various points in regard to the return of the lost tribes.

The Mishnah states:

The Ten Tribes will not return [to the Land of Israel], for it is said, 'And He cast them into another land, as is this day' (Deuteronomy 29:27); just as the day goes and does not return, so they too went and will not return.' This is R. Akiba's view; R. Eliezer said: ' "As this day"— just as the day darkens and then becomes light again, so the ten tribes—even as it went dark for them, so will it become light for them.'

The quote from Rabbi Akiva, however, should probably be understood in light of his disappointed belief that Simon ben Kosiba (surnamed Simon bar Kokhba) was the Messiah who would liberate the Jews from Rome, return the lost tribes and usher in the long-awaited Olam Haba. The failure of the bar Kokhba rebellion convinced Akiva that the lost tribes would not return at that time. It is probably a mistake to take Akiva's statement as a categorical denial of a return at any time.

== House of Judah ==
According to many rabbis and historians, the Jews are largely descended from the House of Judah, the Southern Kingdom of Judah, chiefly consisting of the tribe of Judah, the tribe of Benjamin, with some of the tribe of Levi.

== House of Joseph ==
Some historians, and especially Two House advocates, believe the Hebrew Scriptures indicate that the Kingdom of Israel, sometimes referred to as the "House of Joseph", never returned from their Assyrian Captivity 1 Chr 5:26.

The 1st century Jewish priest and historian, Josephus, writing near the turn of the 2nd century AD, affirmed that the Jews knew where the House of Israel had been taken captive a thousand years earlier:

…the entire body of the people of Israel remained in that country [Media]; wherefore there are but two tribes [Judah and Benjamin] in Asia and Europe subject to the Romans, while the ten tribes are beyond Euphrates till now, and are an immense multitude, and not to be estimated by numbers.

While the multitudinous nature of the exiled ten tribes may be somewhat exaggerated in the opinion of many, it is highly unlikely that Josephus would pen an outright falsehood regarding the Median location of the ten tribes when such a statement could be vociferously denied by his fellow-countrymen if the ten tribes had at any time in the past reunited with the Jews following the Babylonian Captivity.

As shown previously, the Talmud has Rabbi Akiva and Rabbi Eliezer discussing the eventual return of the ten tribes approximately 900 years after the deportation occurred. For the advocate of the two house ideology, this is weighty evidence which indicates that the Northern Kingdom tribes of Israel did not return and unite with the Southern Kingdom of Judah prior to the 1st century.

== Multiplication and re-unification ==
Two House groups also believe that many prophecies from the Hebrew Scriptures indicate that the descendant nations of the ancient Kingdom of Israel will be re-united with the descendants of the ancient Kingdom of Judah. They frequently reference Ezekiel 37 (as below) and similar prophecies:

"16 Moreover, thou son of man, take thee one stick, and write upon it, For Judah, and for the children of Israel his companions: then take another stick, and write upon it, For Joseph, the stick of Ephraim and for all the house of Israel his companions: 17 And join them one to another into one stick; and they shall become one in thine hand. 18 And when the children of thy people shall speak unto thee, saying, Wilt thou not shew us what thou meanest by these? 19 Say unto them, Thus saith the Lord GOD; Behold, I will take the stick of Joseph, which is in the hand of Ephraim, and the tribes of Israel his fellows, and will put them with him, even with the stick of Judah, and make them one stick, and they shall be one in mine hand." (vs. 16–19, KJV).

They also frequently quote from the Book of Hosea (chapters 1–3). In the first chapter (verses 2–9) God instructed this prophet of the Northern Kingdom to marry a prostitute (symbolic of the unfaithfulness of the northern tribes) and then gave two of Hosea's children from this union Hebrew names signifying his rejection of the northern tribes: Lo-Ruchamah (Unpitied) and Lo-Ammi (Not my people). In Hosea 2:3, the eventual reversal of this judgment was indicated by means of a change in these names; and an accompanying change in the meanings of the names: Ruchamah (Pitied) and Ammi (My people). Hosea was told (3:3–5) that the northern tribes would be scattered among the Gentiles, that they would be in seclusion for a long time and become too numerous to be counted; but that in the "latter days," they would return in repentance and come trembling to their God and his goodness.

Two House theology probably becomes most controversial when the ramifications of the Hebrew prophets are taken literally. The prophecy most poignant in the controversy is Genesis 48:19 which indicates that the tribe of Ephraim, half-tribe of Joseph, would become a “multitude of nations” (peoples/goyim), sometimes translated as “fullness of the nations”:

"And his father refused, and said, I know it, my son, I know it: he also shall become a people, and he also shall be great: but truly his younger brother shall be greater than he, and his seed shall become a multitude of nations." (KJV).

According to advocates of Two House theology, the passages above present a problem to those who think that the Jews are representative of all which is left of the twelve tribes of Israel. They argue, "the Jews have not become nor have they ever been a multitude of nations". For a Two House advocate, a common answer is: "no large contingents of Northern Kingdom tribes have been re-united with the Jews of the Southern Kingdom, thus they still exist as various nations/peoples in the world today". Also, someone sympathetic to the Two House ideals may say things like, "the problem is not: the Creator of the Universe lied about Ephraim becoming a multitude of nations/peoples, but simply: we have failed to unravel the mysteries of who is who in the nations today."

There are others, who are more moderate in their approach to the Two House controversy, who choose to see it as an overlooked element in the eschatological restoration of Israel. They disregard the speculation and "pseudohistory" from British-Israel and other Christian Identity groups, adhering to Paul's directive not to pay attention to "endless genealogies which promote speculations rather than the divine training that is in faith" (1 Timothy 1:4, RSV). They leave scattered Israel as a matter to be determined by God, and prefer instead to recognize all believers as participants in its restoration. This growing position has gained sympathy with some in Messianic Judaism among those holding to the "One Law" position, where individuals can "agree to disagree" because the Two House teaching is a matter of eschatology, and thus not of a core theological nature.

Still others will contend that seven-eighths of scripture is undiscernable without first understanding the two house reality, certainly making it into a core theology, and not simply a matter of eschatology. For example, Prof. C. A. L. Totten [1851–1908], of Yale University, was quoted:

I can never be too thankful to the Almighty that in my youth he used the late Professor Wilson to show me the difference between the two houses. The very understanding of this difference is the KEY by which almost the entire Bible becomes intelligible, and I cannot state too strongly that the man who has not yet seen that Israel of the Scripture is totally distinct from the Jewish people, is yet in the very infancy, the mere alphabet, of Biblical study, and that to this day the meaning of seven-eighths of the Bible is shut to his understanding.

== Details disputed ==
Two House advocates generally agree on the big picture, but disagree on numerous details, especially when view points converge amongst Judaism, Messianic Judaism, and Christianity. Identifying specific nations and/or people groups is full of varying opinions and speculations. A great number of Two House advocates think that specific ethnicities can be identified with a particular tribe, and many others choose to let this be decided in the eschaton. Because of the newness of this theological movement, many advocates point out that these issues will have to be worked out over time.

== Replacement theology ==
Advocates of Two House theology wish not to be confused with Replacement Theology or Supersessionism. They refute this label with statements like: “there are two houses, two ancient kingdoms, being discussed and identified, without one replacing the other. The two are brothers who should not trouble each other as they did in their ancient past.” Replacement Theologians virtually make the claim that “the Jews have been replaced by the church”. Such persons may say things like, “We are Israel now.” Two House advocates make no such claims and respectively identify the Jews as Israelites from the Kingdom of Judah.

== See also ==
- Israelite
- Neo-Assyrian Empire
