= Original Goodness (book) =

1989 commentary by Eknath Easwaran

- Author: Eknath Easwaran
- Language: English (original); others
- Publisher: Nilgiri
- Publication date: 1989; 1996; 2017
- Pages: 240 (1989); 286 (1996) 260 (2017)
- ISBN: 978-0-915132-91-1
- OCLC: 35174734

Original Goodness is a practical commentary on the Sermon on the Mount, emphasizing how to translate it into daily living with the aid of spiritual practices. Written by Eknath Easwaran, the book was originally published in the United States in 1989.

Subsequent editions of the book have been published in the US and India, and foreign (non-English) editions have also been published in several languages. The book's original subtitle was Strategies for uncovering your hidden spiritual resources. In its second edition in 1996, as part of a 3-book series entitled Classics of Christian Inspiration the book was subtitled Eknath Easwaran on the beatitudes of the Sermon on the Mount.

Across its various editions, Original Goodness has been reviewed in newspapers, magazines, and professional journals.

== Topics covered ==
All editions of Original Goodness contain 9 chapters. After the first introductory chapter, each of the remaining 8 chapters offers a practical commentary on one of the Beatitudes, as shown in the table (below, at right).

The first chapter opens with a quotation from the 13th century Christian mystic Meister Eckhart:

I have spoken at times of a light in the soul, a light that is uncreated and uncreatable... to the extent that we can deny ourselves and turn away from created things, we shall find our unity and blessing in that little spark in the soul, which neither space nor time touches.

Easwaran states that these words, "addressed to ordinary people... testify to a discovery about the nature of the human spirit as revolutionary as Einstein's theories about the nature of the universe. If truly understood, that discovery would transform the world we live in at least as radically as Einstein's theories changed the world of science."

Ch.	Title	Opening verse: Sermon on the Mount
1.	Original Goodness	(conceptual introduction)
2.	Purity	Blessed are the pure in heart, for they shall see God.
3.	Humility	Blessed are the poor in spirit, for theirs is the kingdom of heaven.
4.	Simplicity	Blessed are the meek, for they shall inherit the earth.
5.	Patience	Blessed are they that mourn, for they shall be comforted.
6.	Love	Blessed are they that are persecuted for righteousness sake, for theirs is the kingdom of heaven.
7.	Mercy	Blessed are the merciful, for they shall obtain mercy.
8.	Peacemaking	Blessed are the peacemakers, for they shall be called the children of God.
9.	Desire	Blessed are they which do hunger and thirst after righteousness, for they shall be filled.

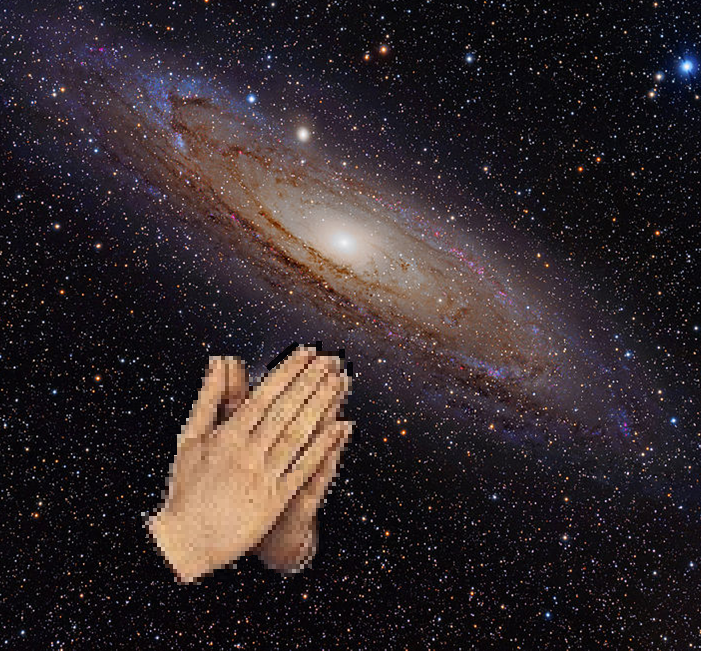
Praying hands with Andromeda Galaxy: symbols for two "radical" transformations in perspective

Easwaran claims that "if we could grasp the mystery of Eckhart's 'uncreated light in the soul' - surely no more abstruse than nuclear physics - the transformation in our thinking would set our world right side up." He explains that behind "Eckhart's passionate sermons, straining to convey the Absolute in the words of the street and marketplace," were "essentially, four principles that Leibnitz would later call the Perennial Philosophy, because they have been taught from age to age in culture after culture." These principles are that 1) there is a "divine core of personality which cannot be separated from God," 2) "this divine essence can be realized," 3) "this discovery is life's real and highest goal," and 4) "when we realize this goal, we discover simultaneously that the divine within ourselves is one and the same in all - all individuals, all creatures, all of life."

The chapter explains that "in this book, a mystic is one who not only espouses these principles... but lives them," resulting in "unfailing compassion, fearlessness, equanimity... these are demanding criteria." Only the "great mystics" - from whom he quotes throughout the book - can be said to fully meet these criteria. After further elaborating on shifts in perspective that accompany this realization, the chapter goes on to argue that "there comes a time in the growth of civilizations, as with individuals, when the life-and-death questions of material existence have been answered, yet the soul still thirsts and physical challenges cease to satisfy."

Then we stand at a crossroads: for without meaningful aspiration, the human being turns destructive. Spiritual fulfillment is an evolutionary imperative. Like a snake that must shed its skin to grow, our industrial civilization must shed its material outlook or strangle in outgrown ideals whose constructive potential has been spent.

Easwaran then argues that whatever one's religious beliefs - "or even if formalized religion is anathema" - it is possible to uncover one's core of goodness through meditation, by which he means "a specific interior discipline which is found in every major religion, though called by different names." Easwaran gives a brief summary of a method of meditating on inspired textual passages, such as the Prayer of Saint Francis, the Beatitudes themselves, or other texts he has collected and recommends. (he states that full instructions are available in his book Passage Meditation). He explains that by meditation, he means the systematic training of one's attention "to turn inward and dwell continuously on a single focus within consciousness, until, after many years, we become so absorbed in the object of our contemplation that... we forget ourselves completely." Then,

In that moment, when we may be said to be empty of ourselves, we are utterly full of what we are dwelling on. This is the central principle of meditation: we become what we meditate on.

The task of making space for the realization of God is challenging, however, and Easwaran quotes Eckhart as stating that "There is no greater valor nor no sterner fight" because "he who would be what he ought to be must stop being what he is."

The remainder of the book then "take[s] up the Beatitudes one by one as strategies for winning the war within." In doing so, it quotes the perspectives and testimony of numerous mystics, primarily Western, but also Eastern. The book also at several places compares mystical perspectives with modern literary, scientific, and cultural perspectives, mentioning or quoting figures ranging from William James, Werner Heisenberg and Carl Sagan to Edmund Hillary, Ogden Nash, and George Bernard Shaw. The most recurring focus is the perspectives of mystics, including William Law, Baruch Spinoza, Bernard of Clairveaux, Catherine of Genoa, Hans Denck, Brother Lawrence, Teresa of Avila, Margery Kemp, the Cloud of Unknowing, Patanjali, and Mahatma Gandhi.

== Reception ==
The National Catholic Reporter, suggested that Original Goodness could be helpful for those who are "looking for a positive, upbeat book to help you pray."

In the Toronto Journal of Theology, Mark Steed stated that the book "presents a methodology for meditation, and does it in a gentle creative manner.... The process and presentation are uniquely in step with life and living." Furthermore,

Each chapter takes the reader further into a personal relationship with self through a fresh and readily available understanding of the Beatitudes, thus preparing the way for personal communion with God. An instruction... is developed for each beatitude and each chapter stands alone and can be revisited as often as needed.

Steed also stated that Easwaran "gives no admonition as to the correct way of meditating, but suggests general strategies for ease in accomplishing this holy work." He cautioned that the book at times "seems to over-emphasize the routine as if it alone will guarantee a relationship with God. Still, Original Goodness is a modern-day gift for all seeking a method of meditation to fit in comfortably with daily routine... it is practical, simple and a delight to read."

Prairie Messenger, a Roman Catholic publication, stated that each of the book's chapters "contains a wealth of wise observations on life today with special emphasis on the mystics and how daily practice of meditation transforms life." It also stated that "the author's reaping of human wisdom and divine inspiration is shared with obvious concern for humanity's welfare," and that "people who have read the books and listened to the voice" of the author are aware of "that same quality of authority" that impressed the "crowds gathered round Jesus... because he spoke with authority."

In the Bulletin of Monastic Interreligious Dialogue, James Conner wrote that

Original Goodness is the phrase Easwaran uses to signify the spark of divinity hidden in everyone of us. It means that the spiritual resources everyone needs—love, compassion, meaning, hope, freedom from fear—are already ours. We simply have to uncover what we already have and are.

He stated that the book "traces our current environmental problems to a single source: our mistaken understanding of who we are and what the universe is like," and that it draws heavily on the Christian mystics and on the Gospel.

In The Hindu, C. S. Ramakrishnan wrote that "Life is a grand challenge and the rightful place of every one of us is at the summit of living. How to scale the peak and abide there by tapping... spiritual resources" is the theme of the book.

Out of every beatitude Easwaran is able to extract a maxim that can waft us to a life of fulfilment and bliss. How to deal with pain and disappointment, bereavement and depression, stress and emotional crises are all explained persuasively as feasible by following "the way that leads you most frequently to awareness of God," as Meister Eckhart would say.

Organica stated that "Easwaran counsels readers to forget themselves (contrary to pop psychologists' how-to books) and learn to focus the mind... according to Easwaran,... its benefits are tangible, cumulative, and vital."

Fellowship in Prayer stated "While Easwaran relies heavily on the Christian mystics of the West, his learning in Eastern wisdom shines on every page as he makes a persuasive case that compassion, hope, meaning, and freedom from fear reside in every heart." It added that "this is the best book yet from the prolific founder of the Blue Mountain Center of Meditation."

The B.C. Catholic wrote that Easwaran is "an astute and trustworthy judge of definitive writers and works," and that in Original Goodness, Easwaran

performs (in parable, anecdote and aphorism) a meditation on Christ's teachings in the Sermon on the Mount, not only the specific biddings of the Beatitudes, but also a beatific message pervading the world, voiced by prophets like Martin Luther King and Mahatma Gandhi.

In The Living Church, Travis DuPriest noted that the book includes "fresh insights for Westerners to see Christian thinkers through the eyes of someone from India."

Several periodicals have also excerpted various parts of Original Goodness.

In 2018 Richard Rohr, in his blog, cited Eknath Easwaran's Original Goodness in his week of 'Daily Meditations January 2018' based on The Beatitudes

== Editions ==
The original edition was published by in 1989 by Nilgiri Press, who republished it in 1996 as one volume in a series entitled Classics of Christian Inspiration. Editions of Original Goodness have been published in Greek, Portuguese, and Spanish,

English-language editions have been published in India and the US. The US editions are:

- Eknath, Eknath (2017). Original goodness: On the Beatitudes of the Sermon on the Mount (rev. 2nd ed.). Tomales, CA: Nilgiri Press. ISBN 0-915132-92-3. ISBN 978-0-915132-91-1 (260 pages)

- Eknath, Eknath (1996). Original goodness: On the Beatitudes of the Sermon on the Mount (2nd ed.). Tomales, CA: Nilgiri Press. ISBN 0-915132-92-3. ISBN 978-0-915132-91-1, OCLC 1005466008 (286 pages)

- Easwaran, Eknath (1989). Original goodness: Strategies for uncovering your hidden spiritual resources (1st ed.). Petaluma, CA: Nilgiri Press. ISBN 0-915132-57-5. ISBN 0-915132-56-7, OCLC 19920044 (240 pages)

The Indian edition:

- Easwaran, Eknath (1997). Discovering your hidden spiritual resources (1st Indian ed.). Mumbai, India: Jaico. ISBN 978-81-7224-580-1. ISBN 81-7224-580-7, OCLC 313926618 (240pages) (title of original 1989 US edition: Original Goodness) (reprinted 2007, OCLC 606355699)

== See also ==
- Love Never Faileth
- Seeing with the Eyes of Love
