= Mantram Handbook =

The Mantram Handbook
- First edition
- Author: Eknath Easwaran
- Language: English original, plus translations: Bahasa Indonesian, Czech, Dutch, German, Hungarian, Italian, Korean, Lithuanian, Spanish, Telugu
- Publisher: Nilgiri Press
- Publication date: 1977
- Pages: 260 (1977)
- ISBN: 978-1-58638-028-1

The Mantram Handbook describes methods of using a mantram — sometimes called a Holy Name — in daily living. Benefits are also described. Written by Eknath Easwaran, the book was originally published in the United States in 1977. Several subsequent editions have been published, sometimes under different titles, in the United States, the United Kingdom, and India. Foreign (non-English) editions have also been published in several languages. The book has been reviewed in newspapers, magazines, and websites, and discussed in professional journals. It has also been a focus of scientific research. The subtitle of the fifth (2008) US edition is: a practical guide to choosing your mantram & calming your mind.

== Topics covered ==
Recommended Mantrams from Diverse Traditions* (discussed: Mantram Handbook, chapter 3)
Christianity	Jesus, Ave Maria, the Jesus Prayer (from Eastern Orthodoxy), and Gospodi pomilui (Russian, "Lord, have mercy")
Hinduism	Rama ('joy', used by Mahatma Gandhi), Om Sri Ram jai Ram jai jai Ram (used by Swami Ramdas), Om namah Shivaya, Hare Rama, Hare Krishna...
Buddhism	Namu Amidabutsu, Om mani padme hum
Judaism	Barukh attah Adonai, Ribono shel olam ("Lord of the universe," Hassidic)
Islam	Bismillah ir-Rahman ir-Rahim, Allah.
*"mantrams of proven power, bequeathed to us by the great spiritual teachers of many traditions"

Easwaran's Mantram Handbook provides an introduction to the practice of repeating mantrams and/or holy names, terms the author uses interchangeably. The book offers the author's practical guidance for choosing a mantram and using it for personal centering and spiritual growth. In the opening chapters, the author recommends selecting a single mantram (such as those in the table at right), and suggests that the reader "take your time choosing a mantram..... then, once you have chosen a mantram, do not change it." Most of the remainder of the book discusses how to integrate the mantram into daily living to improve skills and solve various types of problems. Late in the book, Easwaran describes how the mantram can be combined with other spiritual practices, such as meditation. Easwaran's approach is distinctive, in that he recommends a method of sitting meditation that does not focus on the mantram. Accordingly, the entire concern of the Mantram Handbook is in how to use a mantram throughout the day, at times apart from sitting meditation.

With only slight variation, each edition of the Mantram Handbook has contained the same 12 major parts:

1.	Initiation into the Mantram	Describes author's own experience of benefit from a mantram. Explains the mantram's power generally, and the value of using a mantram from tradition: "All the great religions have produced powerful spiritual formulas which are.... the living symbol of the profoundest reality that the human being can conceive of."
2.	Choosing a Mantram	Discusses various tips for choosing a mantram. For example, "it is important to take into account your own background, your response to the meaning, and the practical significance of the words.... Take your time.... once you have chosen a mantram, do not change it."
3.	Some Great Mantrams	Gives conceptual and devotional background for mantrams/holy names from various traditions, including Christianity, Hinduism, Buddhism, Judaism, and Islam (see table above).
4.	Making the Mantram Part of Your Day.	Explains that "when you begin to look for opportunities to say the mantram, you find them everywhere." Twelve subsections include 'while waiting', 'while walking', 'when sick', 'while doing mechanical tasks', 'chanting the mantram', 'with children', 'boredom', 'while going to sleep', and 'when not to say the mantram'.
5.	Keeping the Mind Steady.	Explains the value of a "well-trained mind" that is free from unnecessary vacillation. Six subsections include 'below the surface of consciousness', 'a still mind', 'the mantram is a transformer', and 'the elephant and the bamboo'.
6.	Overcoming Likes & Dislikes.	One can become "mature... not conditioned by compulsive likes and dislikes, habits and opinions.... through repetition of the mantram and exercising the will," thereby conserving "a tremendous amount of our vital energy." Nine subsections include 'tackling jobs we dislike', 'learning to drop a job at will', and 'freedom in personal relationships'.
7.	Excitement & Depression.	Using the mantram to avoid cycles of excitement followed by depression. Five subsections include 'different faces of excitement', 'the pendulum', and 'guarding against depression'.
8.	Harnessing Fear, Anger, & Greed.	Negative emotions are "power going to waste.... the mantram... can harness all this destructive power... and transform it: fear into fearlessness, anger into compassion, and greed into the desire to be of service" Sixteen subsections include 'when anger, fear, or greed is sweeping you away', 'worry', 'anxiety', 'harnessing anger's power'.
9.	The Mantram at the Time of Death.	At death, major religious traditions say that our individual consciousness merges into a divine reality "if we have been repeating the mantram... until it has become an integral part of our consciousness" Five subsections include 'the significance of death', 'the mantram at the moment of death', 'the process of death'.
10.	The Goal of Life.	All people have "an aching need for a goal worthy of our complete dedication", the "highest goal of life... though different religions call it by different names." Six subsections include 'the world of separateness', 'ego', and 'effort and grace'.
11.	The Mantram and Other Spiritual Disciplines.	Briefly describes Easwaran's eight point program of Passage Meditation (see article), in which Point 1 is meditating on an inspirational passage, and Point 2 is mantram repetition.
12.	Becoming Established in the Mantram.	"Over a period of many years.... the mantram [can] become an integral part of your being, permeating your consciousness... [which corresponds to] what Saint Paul means by 'pray without ceasing'." This "transforms our entire vision of life", and "the joy of this state has to be experienced to be described"

The most recent (5th) US edition contains a foreword by Daniel H. Lowenstein. Offering perspectives as a neurologist and medical educator, Lowenstein states that

The science of neurobiology gives another way to understand how the mantram could be working. From studies using magnetic resonance imaging (MRI), we know that concentrating on a short phrase will activate specific areas in the front and side of the brain. These areas, the frontal and parietal lobes, are involved in selective attention - the capacity to maintain a single focus despite the presence of distracting stimuli.... as though the mantram provides access to a peaceful, grounded center that puts our cravings, drives, and other immediate needs in perspective.

The book also contains an index.

== Reviews and influence ==
Reviews of the Mantram Handbook have appeared in The Hindu, Business Standard (India), The Economic Times (India), The B.C. Catholic, the Pacific Sun, Cosmos (Australia), Medical Self-Care, Journal of Ecumenical Studies, Journal of Psychology and Christianity, Journal of Transpersonal Psychology, and Booklist. The Mantram Handbook has also been discussed in books authored by Andrew Weil, in books edited by Thomas G. Plante and J. Harold Ellens, and on websites such as Spirituality and Health.

Andrew Weil stated that the Mantram Handbook "is the only book I have seen on the use of mantram as a centering technique."

In the Business Standard, Apratim Barua wrote that

Mantram Handbook... is concise, simple and practical.... Where Easwaran scores over other books of a similar type is in his non-sectarian approach and his appeal to common-sense.... Second, Easwaran's account is deeply personal and, therefore, all the more convincing. He has traversed the same path himself and is aware of all the snares and pitfalls. The tone of the book is cheerful, optimistic and positive.... The book is not merely about mantrams. Its aim is the cultivation of a more wholesome and positive approach to life.

In the Journal of Psychology and Christianity, Doug Oman and Joseph Driskill wrote that

For people of any religious faith or none, Easwaran offers a highly practical yet consistently spiritual discussion of integrating a holy name into daily modern living. Presenting the most comprehensive practical discussion of how to draw upon a holy name throughout the day in a variety of ordinary and challenging situations, this book is also uniquely universal as a resource for professionals working with diverse populations.

In The Hindu, Anita Joshua wrote that

Knowing full well the potential of the mantram in releasing new and positive energy that can help chase away seemingly incurable problems, Eknath Easwaran took upon himself the task of explaining it in the most simplest of terms and the way it works on the human system. And, at the outset itself, he explains that mantram is not exclusive to the Hindu religion.... He signs off by explaining how the mantram relates to a large body of spiritual disciplines ... [and] is particularly careful to differentiate such spiritual disciplines from dogmas.

Also in The Hindu, M. P. Pandit wrote that as an

exponent of Eastern spiritual disciplines in the university circles in the West, Eknath Easwaran has evolved a style that makes abstruse concepts simple and appealing.... The author refutes the charge that the practice of mantra is self-hypnosis. It is not that any word repeated for a length of time will have the same results.... he explains mantra as 'that which enables us to cross the sea of the mind.' Actually the traditional derivation is mananat trayate, helps to cross the ocean of samsara.

The Economic Times (India) wrote that "Easwaran strips the mystery off the mantram and explains how it can help us gain the will and insight to refashion our lives":

The method Easwaran suggests is simple: pick a mantram of 'proven power' recommended by the great spiritual teachers of any religion that you follow. Easwaran makes no attempt to avoid references to religion and the aim of his technique is, in fact, to take one closer to God. Claims Easwaran: "Constant repetition and practice is required for the mantram to take root in our consciousness and gradually transform it, just as constant repetition makes the advertiser's jingle stick in our minds."... Even a sceptic could benefit from the solutions Easwaran puts forward.

In the Journal of Ecumenical Studies, E. James Baesler noted that "several of the eastern Christian and eastern Hindu traditions recommend reciting the Holy Name outside the predetermined prayer periods." Most also

recommend reciting the Holy Name during a time set apart exclusively for prayer.... The one exception to this pattern is Easwaran's [Mantram Handbook] recommendation to recite the Holy Name at virtually all times except the time set apart for meditation/prayer. Easwaran's rationale... is that meditation times are for... the repetition of an inspirational passage, while repeating the [mantram] does not require as much discipline and thus can be 'prayed' anytime.

In the Journal of Transpersonal Psychology, Thomas Weide wrote that "for a so-called handbook, the book mentions surprisingly few different mantrams, and omits much material commonly covered by mantram advocates." But Weide recommended the book "highly to the total transpersonal public, not just to mantram lovers," stating that

Easwaran writes with lovely simplicity about how to live a more spiritual life in general, and.... gives a splendid explanation of how mantrams work, how to choose one, and above all, how to work on oneself in general, using a mantram merely as one of several important practices.

Similarly, Apratim Barua (quoted above) expressed concern that "The title is a slight misnomer. The book is not merely about mantrams.... If anything, the number of mantrams discussed is woefully inadequate. He takes up some four in all [sic], one from each major religion.... This may be due to the fact that the aim of the book is the cultivation of a more wholesome and positive approach to life."

In Medical Self-Care, Thomas Ferguson wrote that the Mantram Handbook described "how mantrams work, how to choose one, and how to use it... Spiritual, non-sectarian, quietly delightful." Booklist wrote that "This guide by a Hindu expert on religions is refreshingly real. He also contradicts popular misconceptions about mantrams and gives practical advice."

Sections of the book have been excerpted.

== Research ==
The Mantram Handbook was the primary instructional text in several research studies on mantram repetition conducted through the Veterans Administration in San Diego, California, by Jill Bormann and her colleagues. Randomized trials that she led have reported benefits from mantram repetition that include higher quality of life, increased use of positive strategies of coping with stress, gains in faith/assurance and spiritual connectedness, and reductions in psychological distress, PTSD symptoms, and anger. Additional research findings offered evidence linking mantram use with reduced stress, anxiety, anger, and PTSD symptoms, as well as increased quality of life and spiritual well-being, and documenting that study participants found mantram repetition useful for managing stress, emotions, sleep/insomnia, and unwanted thoughts. The Mantram Handbook was also cited as a main source in developing a mantram-centered intervention for nurses in Korea. The intervention was found to reduce burnout, and to enhance well-being, spiritual integrity, and leadership practice.

== Editions ==
All US editions have been published by Nilgiri Press, which also published the original 1977 edition. Non-English editions in translation have been published in Bahasa Indonesian, Czech, Dutch, German, German, Hungarian, Italian, Korean, Lithuanian, Spanish, and Telugu.

English-language editions have been published in the United States, the United Kingdom and India. The US editions are:

- Easwaran, Eknath (2008). The Mantram Handbook: A Practical Guide to Choosing Your Mantram & Calming Your Mind (5th ed.). Tomales, CA: Nilgiri Press. ISBN 978-1-58638-028-1. OCLC 234041052.
- Easwaran, Eknath (1998). The Mantram Handbook (4th, revised ed.). Tomales, CA: Nilgiri Press. ISBN 978-0-915132-98-0.
- Easwaran, Eknath (1993). The Unstruck Bell: Powerful New Strategies for Using a Mantram (3rd ed.). Tomales, CA: Nilgiri Press. ISBN 978-0-915132-76-8.
- Easwaran, Eknath (1985). Formulas for Transformation: A Mantram Handbook (2nd ed.). Petaluma, CA: Nilgiri Press. ISBN 978-0-915132-30-0. OCLC 317382577.
- Easwaran, Eknath (1977). The Mantram Handbook: Formulas for Transformation (1st ed.). Berkeley, CA: Nilgiri Press. ISBN 978-0-915132-10-2. OCLC 2837587.

A British edition:

- Easwaran, Eknath (1978). The Mantram Handbook (1st ed.). London: Routledge & Kegan Paul. ISBN 978-0-7100-8974-8.

Two Indian editions:

- Easwaran, Eknath (2013). The Mantram Handbook: A Practical Guide to Choosing Your Mantram and Calming Your Mind. Mumbai, India: Jaico. ISBN 978-81-8495-450-0. OCLC 865538440.

- Easwaran, Eknath (1997). The Mantram Handbook. New Delhi, India: Penguin, India (Arkana). ISBN 978-0-14-019113-4.
