= Conquest of Mind =

- Author: Eknath Easwaran
- Language: English; Dutch, Indonesian, Korean, Marathi, Portuguese, Spanish, Telugu
- Publisher: Nilgiri Press; others
- Publication date: 1988; 2010; others
- Pages: 183(1988); 217(2010); others
- ISBN: 9781586380472
- OCLC: 18520298

Conquest of Mind is a book that describes practices and strategies for leading the spiritual life. Written by Eknath Easwaran, the strategies are intended to be usable within any major religious tradition, or outside of all traditions. The book was originally published in the United States in 1988. Multiple revised English-language editions have been published, and translations have also appeared in several other European and Asian languages. The book has been reviewed in newspapers and magazines.

== Background ==
When Easwaran wrote Conquest of Mind in 1988, he had been teaching meditation in the US for almost 30 years, and had already published a book, Meditation (1978), that systematically explained the details of his method of meditation. This earlier book had briefly described the importance of training the mind as a key part of meditation. In Conquest of Mind, Easwaran provides a much more extensive discussion of how his program can be used to train the mind, and the importance of training the mind.

In his introduction to Conquest of Mind, Easwaran quotes the Buddha's statement that "All that we are... is the result of what we have thought." Therefore, Easwaran says, "nothing... can be more important than being able to choose the way we think." And so, he explains,

In this book I present the art of training the mind how to respond to life's challenges, drawing on almost thirty years of teaching meditation to an American audience. Each chapter was originally a talk given to a select group of students. I touch on theory, but the emphasis is always practical and down-to earth. I have written for those who want to understand not only how the mind works, but also how it can be changed - which means, in this context, those who are interested in the actual practice of meditation.

Later, he explains that "This is not a book about the Buddha or his teachings, yet I will mention him often in these pages [because] no one teaches more clearly that mastery of life depends on mastering the mind."

== Topics covered ==
Each US edition of Conquest of Mind begins with an introduction. It is followed in the 1988 and 2010 US editions by five major parts, each divided into 14 chapters. The chapters in Part Four were omitted in the 2001 US edition.

Easwaran's introduction explains how he uses the words "meditation" and "mystic." He cautions that mixing instructions from different perspectives can result in confusion. "If you want to become a tennis champion, you don't take lessons from Vic Braden and Nick Bollettieri at the same time; they have utterly different approaches to the game. Meditation teachers have different approaches too. When Easwaran speaks of meditation, he means

a dynamic discipline [for] teaching attention to flow without a break toward a single inspirational focus within the mind... until finally the mind becomes completely absorbed... [and] is still, calm, and clear. This is our native state.... As the Bible puts it, "Be still, and know that I am God.

In Easwaran's language, the "great mystics" — who he often uses as illustrative examples — are people who have attained this goal. "Mysticism," a word Easwaran regards as easily misunderstood, refers to "the conviction, born of personal experience, that there is a divine core in human personality which each of us can realize directly, and that making this discovery is the real goal of our lives."

Part One is entitled "Taking Charge of Your Thoughts." It consists of 4 chapters. Thinking in Freedom (ch. 1) uses the mastery of a skilled surfer or ballet dancer as an analogy for the type of mastery that Easwaran believes all people would like in the art of living. Such mastery is attainable by training the mind, he says, but it requires great practice. Living Skills (ch. 2) describes Easwaran's method of meditating on a passage, its benefits for being present-focused, and for reacting to other people freely, rather than compulsively. Training the Mind (ch. 3) urges readers to think of the various parts of their week, such as home and work, as exercise stations that each provide a special opportunity to train the mind, and reduce egoism.

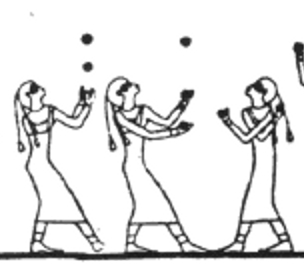
Ancient Egyptian jugglers (c. 1994-1781 BCE, Middle Kingdom).

In Juggling (ch. 4), Easwaran describes feats of juggling that he witnessed in San Francisco's Ghirardelli Square, stating that "what that young man learned to do with his body, you can learn to do with your mind." Mental juggling involves "likes and dislikes.... Can you change your likes at will?.... We need to learn to enjoy doing something we dislike or to enjoy not doing something we like, when it is in the long-term best interests of others or ourselves." Easwaran describes his own experiences in changing his eating habits, stating that he learned from Mahatma Gandhi that "training the palate is a powerful aid in training the mind."

Part Two, "Reshaping Your Life," also contains 4 chapters, entitled Learning to Swim, All Life Is Yoga, Tremendous Trifles, and The Forces of Life. They compare mental skill to swimming, and the mind to a lake; Describe strategies usable throughout the day for deepen meditation; Present examples of the "thousands of little occasions [on which] the mind is taught to be calm and kind: not instantaneously... but in the ordinary choices of the day"; and describe techniques for allying ourselves with an "upward drive to evolve into spiritual beings," rather than with past conditioning in narrow, selfish pursuits.

Part Three, "Strategies from the Buddha," contains two chapters. Obstacles and Opportunities describes how to overcome five obstacles identified by the Buddha: sensuality, ill will, laziness, restlessness, and fear/anxiety. Strategies for Freedom discusses five Buddhist "strategies for freedom," including using "a right thought to drive out one that is wrong," reflection, withdrawing attention, and going "to the root."

Part Four, entitled "Three Spiritual Strengths," contains 3 chapters. They are titled Determination, Detachment, and Discrimination, and describe tools and opportunities for developing each of these qualities, drawing on examples that range from Easwaran's own life to Teresa of Avila, Thérèse of Lisieux, Jacob Boehme, Mahatma Gandhi, Meister Eckhart, Charles Dickens, and space exploration.

Part Five, "Instructions in Meditation," contains a single chapter that describes Easwaran's eight-point program of passage meditation.

== Reception ==
Reviews have appeared in The Hindu, B. C. Catholic, and the Bulletin of Monastic Interreligious Dialogue. The Quest, Conquest of Mind was listed in The Times of India as one of 3 "best books."

The Hindu wrote that Easwaran "gives a simple perspective on how to still the mind." and his "ideas are down to earth and his writings unpretentious":

[I]n a simple everyday manner, [the author] talks about the situations where mind can and must control its ups and downs... [and] the key to this is meditation. He suggests ways which he says he has practised himself. The book tells you that there are no quickfixes to anything - self discipline is a lifelong process which is both arduous and satisfying eventually. Perhaps the answer to our troubled times.

Later, The Hindu reviewed the Telugu translation of Conquest of Mind. The reviewer, N. C. Ramanujachary, wrote that Easwaran "draws many ideas from the Buddha, throughout the book, but carefully analyses and establishes the continued relevance of his teachings." Ramanujachary stated that

The book is the outcome of [Easwaran's] long experience of teaching the young and modern minds... The presentation is lucid [and] leaves no sense of ambiguity anywhere.... The radical mind needs a verbal understanding first and then the way to practical understanding opens.

In The B.C. Catholic, Paul Matthew St. Pierre wrote that Conquest of Mind "addresses issues of mind control... as it pertains to [finding] one's true spiritual self and avoiding getting caught by the forces of secularism, mediatization, narcissism, and self-interest within the world." He stated that

The [book's] discussion is partly philosophical, an informal commentary on the history of lucid ideas and spirituality, and partly practical, a briefing on the disciplines of centering and concentrating the mind, as in meditation, but also in the simple matters of not losing one's train of thought amidst all the distractions of daily life.

To St. Pierre, "The paradox in Easwaran's discussion is that, to avoid giving over the mind to the world, one must... transcend the way of thinking that is given over to the world and start thinking for oneself, and in the company of Jesus, St. Francis of Assisi, the Buddha, Sri Krishna, the Sufi mystic Jalaluddin Rumi, and many others."

The Quest wrote that the author "has a wonderfully easy style of writing," that Conquest of Mind "offers clear guidance for training the mind," and that "there probably is no better meditation teacher" than the author.

In the Bulletin of Monastic Interreligious Dialogue, Pascaline Coff wrote that the book is "an interreligious gift to all," a "very successful effort to present the art of training the mind to respond to life’s challenges and discover the True Self in the process—not just a transformation but transfiguration whereby one is love." She added that

Monastics, especially encouraged to have the "mind of Christ" within them, ought to be indebted to Eknath for the manual of deprogramming or untraining the mind, a phrase once used by Thomas Merton.

== Editions ==
The original edition was published by in 1988 by Nilgiri Press, which also published two subsequent US editions. Two English-language editions have also been published in India, and non-English editions have been published in Dutch, Indonesian, Korean, Marathi, Portuguese, Spanish, and Telugu.

The US editions are:

- Easwaran, Eknath (2010). Conquest of mind: take charge of your thoughts & reshape your life through meditation (3rd, revised ed.). Petaluma, CA: Nilgiri Press. ISBN 9781586380472. ISBN 1586380478, OCLC 500801448 (217 pages)
- Easwaran, Eknath (2001). Conquest of mind (2nd ed.). Petaluma, CA: Nilgiri Press. ISBN 1586380052. ISBN 1586380060, OCLC 51937333 (174 pages)
- Easwaran, Eknath (1988). Conquest of mind (1st ed.). Petaluma, CA: Nilgiri Press. ISBN 0915132508. ISBN 0915132516, OCLC 18520298 (183 pages)

The Indian English-language editions are:

- Easwaran, Eknath (2011). Conquering the mind: take charge of your thoughts and reshape your life through meditation. Ahmedabad, India: Jaico. ISBN 9788184952711. OCLC 772499577. ISBN 8184952716 (217 pages)
- Easwaran, Eknath (1999). Conquest of mind. New Delhi, India: Penguin India. ISBN 9780140285727. ISBN 0140285725, OCLC 48089077 (183 pages)

A section of the book was excerpted in Yoga International.
