= Gandhi the Man =

Biography of Mahatma Gandhi

- Author: Eknath Easwaran
- Language: English (original); Chinese, Czech, Dutch, German, Indonesian, Japanese, Korean, Kurdish, Persian
- Genre: Politicians - India - Biography
- Publisher: Nilgiri Press; others
- Publication date: 1973; 1978; 1991; 2011; others
- Pages: 200 (2011); 179 (1997); 186 (1978); 157 (1973).
- ISBN: 978-1-58638-055-7

Gandhi the Man is a biography of Mohandas Karamchand Gandhi written by Eknath Easwaran. The book was originally published in the United States in 1973. Several subsequent expanded editions have been published. Non-English editions have also been published in several languages.

== Topics covered ==
All US editions of Gandhi the Man contain four major parts entitled 1) The Transformation, 2) The Way of Love, 3) Mother and Child, and 4) Gandhi the Man. All US editions also contain numerous photographs. More recent editions contain a foreword by Michael Nagler and an Appendix by Timothy Flinders entitled "How Satyagraha Works." The 4th edition (2011) contains several pages of maps and chronology (timelines), and additional background notes.

== Reviews and influence ==
Reviews have appeared in the New York Post, the San Francisco Chronicle, The History Teacher, and elsewhere.

In the New York Post, Bill McKibben wrote that Gandhi the Man "seems at first glance like pure hagiography, most notable for the wonderful photographs it contains. But it isn't a picture book - in fact,

in very few words, it comes closer to giving some sense of how Gandhi saw his life than any other account I have read. From the outside, his life looked like a political drama... But from the inside, Easwaran argues quite persuasively, it looked quite different. Gandhi mastered his own life - took charge of his mind and his body. As a result he knew no fear, only great and undifferentiated love for the rest of creation. And so he was able to powerfully affect that creation."

In The History Teacher Donald Cody wrote that "the book's uniqueness lies in the effective interspersing of some six dozen pictures throughout the relatively short text [...which] itself is biographical only in a very general way; the author's major goal is to reveal the spiritual dimensions of Gandhi's life.... Teachers and college students, in particular, will find the two or three hours spent with this book a rare inspirational experience. Even high school students who appreciate works with a spiritual focus will be affected by its profound message." Cody also wrote that "while the author describes [the] political struggle in considerable detail, he is more interested in showing that Gandhi did not see achieving India's freedom as his primary goal. In fact, had he not believed that British rule was particularly injurious to the Indian lower classes, he might not have involved himself in the independence movement at all."

In the Bulletin of Science, Technology & Society, Tonya Emeigh suggested that Gandhi the Man could be used for teaching humane attitudes towards farm animals.

The publisher quoted influential religion scholar Huston Smith as stating that "This book belongs in every public library in the English-speaking world."

== Curriculum ==
Gandhi the Man serves as the basis of a 7-week curriculum and course offered through a US-based church denomination.

== Editions ==
The original edition was published by in 1973 by Glide Publications (San Francisco). Several later US editions were published Nilgiri Press. Other editions have been published in Chinese (PRC), Czech, Dutch, German, Indonesian, Japanese, Korean, Kurdish, and Persian.

English-language editions have been published in Canada, India, and the US. The US editions are:

- Easwaran, Eknath (2011). Gandhi the Man: How one man changed himself to change the world (4th ed.). Tomales, CA: Nilgiri Press. ISBN 978-1-58638-055-7. ISBN 1-58638-055-9 (200 pages) ebook: ISBN 978-1-58638-067-0
- Easwaran, Eknath (1997). Gandhi the Man (3rd ed.). Tomales, CA: Nilgiri Press. ISBN 0-915132-96-6.(179 pages, hardcover); ISBN 978-0-915132-96-6 (179 pages, paperback)
- Easwaran, Eknath (1983). Gandhi the Man (2nd ed.). New York: Random House. ISBN 0-394-71497-0.(192 pages); ISBN 978-0-394-71497-4 (192 pages)
- Easwaran, Eknath (1978). Gandhi the Man (2nd ed.). Tomales, CA: Nilgiri Press. ISBN 0-915132-13-3.(hardcover); ISBN 0-915132-14-1 (paperback)
- Easwaran, Eknath (1973), Gandhi the Man (1st ed.). San Francisco, CA: Glide Publications. Compiled from the perspective of Eknath Easwaran by Jo Anne Black, Nick Harvey, and Laurel Robertson. ISBN 0-912078-17-0, LC 77176240 (157 pages, paper)

Canadian edition:

- Easwaran, Eknath (1983) (1983). Gandhi the Man (2nd ed.). Winnipeg, Canada: Turnstone Press. ISBN 0-85500-194-1.(192 pages); ISBN 978-0-85500-194-0 (192 pages)

Indian edition:

- Eknath Easwaran (1997). Gandhi the Man. Mumbai, India: Jaico. ISBN 81-7224-517-3, ISBN 978-81-7224-517-7 (192 pages).

== See also ==
- Nonviolent Soldier of Islam (by same author, a biography of Gandhi's Muslim associate, Abdul Ghaffar Khan)
- The Story of My Experiments with Truth (Gandhi's autobiography)
- List of artistic depictions of Mohandas Karamchand Gandhi
