= Bapu (book) =

Bapu: Conversations and Correspondence with Mahatma Gandhi
- Author: F. Mary Barr
- Language: English
- Subject: Mahatma Gandhi
- Genre: Biography
- Publisher: International Book House
- Publication date: 1949
- Publication place: India
- Pages: 214 (1st ed.), 237 (2nd ed.)
- OCLC: 8372568
- Text: Bapu: Conversations and Correspondence with Mahatma Gandhi at Internet Archive

Bapu: Conversations and Correspondence with Mahatma Gandhi is an autobiographical description of F. Mary Barr's relationship and interactions with Mahatma Gandhi, whom she refers to as Bapu (father). Several of Gandhi's letters to the author, originally an English missionary in India, are included in full. The book was originally published in India in 1949. A revised edition was published in India in 1956. The book has been reviewed in several magazines, and discussed in other books.

== Background ==
In her Prologue, Barr describes the book as an "offering to thousands of persons all over the world who look up to... Gandhi, but have not had the author's opportunity of seeing him at work over a period of years". She explains that her intent is "to show Gandhi, the human being, to those many Europeans who are frankly puzzled by his personality, and... to give a great deal of detail such as would satisfy those who love him" and wish to learn even more about him. For the latter group, Gandhi's letters are "given with his exact wording, punctuation and headings". When Gandhi was asked if he would mind her writing a book, he said "Yes, you may write your book. It will remove come cobwebs".

A note from the publisher stated that the manuscript of the book had been received before Gandhi was assassinated, and that "it was felt that much of the feeling of devotion and understanding would have been lost if the present tense was changed, and so we prefer to present the book as if about a Living Personage".

== Synopsis ==
Bapu opens with Barr explaining how she came to meet Mahatma Gandhi after having been in India for ten years in charge of a missionary boarding school in Hyderabad State. When she was in England on a furlough in 1931 she began to take an interest in Gandhi's writings and speeches. When returning to India, Barr had the good fortune of being a fellow passenger of Gandhi's on a ship from Italy to India, allowing her to become acquainted with Gandhi and observe the daily patterns of behavior of him and his small party of companions returning from the second Round Table Conference in London.

Later chapters describe Barr's correspondence and various meetings with Gandhi, how she was pressured by the British government and missionary authorities to end her association with Gandhi. her eventual resignation from her position at the mission, her visits to Gandhi at his ashram and in prison, how she spent time living at Gandhi's ashram, and how she eventually left the ashram in the service of Gandhi's movement. In an epilogue she states "The human personality depicted in the foregoing pages is no longer in the World as we knew him, but 'his soul goes marching on.' He brought religion into the service of the humdrum of daily life.... by sheer love and self-discipline he made mundane things beautiful: from pans to politics, he made them shine."

The book also contains a glossary of the meanings of about two dozen Indian words. Both editions contain an introduction by K. G. Mashruwala. The second edition contains an additional chapter, a tribute to Khan Abdul Ghaffar Khan, a comrade of Gandhi's, whose houseguest she was in 1941.

== Reviews and influence ==
Reviews of Bapu have appeared in The Times of India, the Modern Review, the Indian Review and The Aryan Path

The Times of India viewed the first edition as having "succeeded very well", stating that the book was

written unassumingly [and] is good in that it achieves its purpose. A personality is best revealed by a subtle compound of the subjective and objective methods; this is done to an appreciable extent.... [and the book] sheds considerable light on his personality as known to his intimate friends.

Two reviews appeared in the Modern Review. In 1950, Nirmal Kumar Bose wrote that the first edition

will be read with great interest by readers who wish to know more about the character of Mahatma Gandhi.... Mary Barr's book reveals how loving he [Gandhi] could be in respect of those who came into intimate contact with him through common service to the poor.

Bose speculated that "Perhaps a large part of the greatness of Mahatma Gandhiwas due to this."

In 1958, D. N. Mookerjea reviewed the second edition, stating that "A great life is a source of inspiration to all. People of different countries, castes and creeds find a common meeting-ground", and that Barr "gives us a true, unexaggerated, respectful account of this great man".

Reviews of Bapu also appeared in the Indian Review (1949) and The Aryan Path (1957).

In his Gandhi bibliography, Pandiri describes Bapu as "filled with carefully observed and recorded details of Gandhi's daily life", stating that "Barr's narration is valuable since it is tender and yet free of sentimentalism".

Weber described Bapu as "touch[ing] on [Gandhi's] motherly relationship with the author", and devoted several pages to narrating Barr's life, drawing largely on Bapu.

Bapu includes a prayer, composed by Gandhi and first given to Barr, that has been displayed at Sabarmati Ashram. Suresh Chandvankar described seeing the prayer displayed in Gandhi's former cottage at the ashram when he visited in 2012. The prayer has been translated into Gujarati and Hindi and set to music.

Barr's account of her visit with Khan Abdul Ghaffar Khan, which appears in the second edition of Bapu, was cited in Eknath Easwaran's Nonviolent Soldier of Islam, in which he calls the chapter "the most intimate glimpse of Badshah Khan yet produced by a westerner".

== Editions ==
The original edition was published in 1949 by International Book House in Bombay, and the revised edition appeared in 1956 from the same publisher. The book republished several letters from Mahatma Gandhi in their entirety, and Gandhi is sometimes listed as a second author:

- Barr, F. Mary; Gandhi, Mahatma (1949). Bapu: Conversations and Correspondence with Mahatma Gandhi (1st ed.). Bombay, India: International Book House. OCLC 868286. (214 pages)
- Barr, F. Mary; Gandhi, Mahatma (1956). Bapu: Conversations and Correspondence with Mahatma Gandhi (2nd ed.). Bombay, India: International Book House. OCLC 8372568. (237 pages)
