= Nonviolent Soldier of Islam =

2009 biography by Eknath Easwaran

Nonviolent Soldier of Islam: Badshah Khan, a man to match his mountains
- Ghaffar Khan with Mahatma Gandhi (cover of 1999 edition)
- Author: Eknath Easwaran
- Language: English; later translated into Arabic, Indonesian, Italian, Korean, and Turkish
- Genre: Pushtuns - biography; Politicians - Pakistan - Biography
- Publisher: Nilgiri Press; others
- Publication date: 1984; 1999; others
- Pages: 274 (1999); 240 (1984)
- ISBN: 978-1888314007

Nonviolent Soldier of Islam is a biography of Khan Abdul Ghaffar Khan (1890-1988), an ally of Gandhi's in the Indian independence movement. Originally written by Eknath Easwaran in English, foreign editions have also been published in Arabic and several other languages. The book was originally published in the United States in 1984 as A Man to Match His Mountains: Badshah Khan, nonviolent soldier of Islam. A second edition was published in 1999 with the title Nonviolent soldier of Islam: Badshah Khan, a man to match his mountains. Both editions include an afterword by Timothy Flinders. The 1999 US edition contains a new foreword by Easwaran, and an enlarged section of photographs of Khan. The book has been reviewed in magazines, newspapers, and professional journals. The book inspired the making of the 2008 film The Frontier Gandhi: Badshah Khan, a Torch for Peace.

== Topics covered ==
Arabic edition (1987), published by the Palestinian Center for the Study of Nonviolence.

Both US editions of Nonviolent Soldier are divided into four major parts. Parts one through three tell the story of Khan's life up to Indian independence in 1947. Part four, by Flinders, contains an afterword that describes Khan's life after 1947, and also contains a chronology, as well as a glossary, bibliography, index, maps, and extensive notes on sources.

== Reviews and influence ==
Reviews have appeared in the New York Post, the Washington Post, the Christian Science Monitor, the Los Angeles Times, The New Yorker, Frontline (India), and Kashmir Images.

In 1985, the Washington Post stated that "Eknath Easwaran's great achievement is telling an American audience about an Islamic practitioner of pacifism at a moment when few in the West understand its effectiveness and fewer still associate it with anything Islamic." A year later, after Badshah Khan had won the Bharat Ratna, India's highest civilian honor, the same paper again quoted from the book:

"Easwaran writes of the myth that the British were civilized oppressors. In the 1930s and '40s under British tyranny, the 'Pathans had to endure mass shootings, torture, the destruction of their fields and homes, jail, flogging and humiliations. Khan himself spent 15 years in British prisons. But the Pathans remained nonviolent and stood unmoved -- suffering and dying in large numbers to win their freedom.'... Easwaran believes that 'were Khan's example better known, the Western world, as well as Muslims caught in the web of violence all over the Middle East, might come to recognize that the highest religious values of Islam are deeply compatible with a nonviolence that has the power to resolve great conflicts.'"

In the journal History Compass, a review of resources for teaching about Afghanistan and Pushtu populations, stated that Nonviolent Soldier of Islam was a "highly readable book for the popular market [that] incorporates some of the clearest discussions of an Islamic version of something akin to liberation theology.... its explicitly Gandhian perspective might serve as a useful counterpoint to colonial perspectives" (pp. 548–549).

In late 2001, the book was discussed in Whole Earth magazine, which stated that "Perhaps no time is more apt than now to study the life of Abdul Ghaffar Khan." The book was also reviewed in Yes! Magazine, and elsewhere.

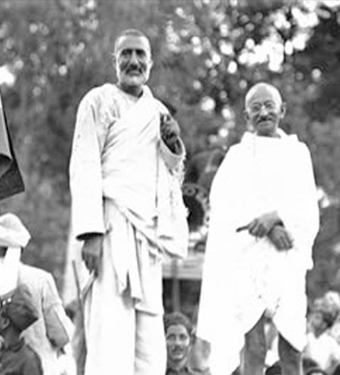
Ghaffar Khan with Mahatma Gandhi.

The publisher quoted Mubarak Awad, director of the Palestinian Centre for the Study of Nonviolence in Jerusalem, as stating that "This book is a must for every Muslim. The life of Khan can change and will challenge many readers in the Middle East."

In late 2001, the book was reviewed in Frontline (India), and described as "crisply written, expertly organised and gripping.... [Easwaran's] subtle grasp of Khan Abdul Ghaffar Khan's non-violent vision of humanity makes this a very exceptional and special book." The reviewer, who stated that "between 1969 and 1988 I was in his [Khan's] presence many times," noted that

Easwaran calls the 6'6" tall Khan, "a Muslim St. Francis". It is so apt.... The Pathan had a most moving and magnanimous understanding of his great religion. He saw no conflict in his triple identities - his Pathaniat, Hindustaniat and Insaniat (humanity) was an organic whole....

In the National Catholic Reporter, John Dear described Nonviolent Soldier as "the best introduction to Khan." Dear wrote that "over the past few months, as I have struggled to pray for and think about the suffering people of Pakistan, Afghanistan and Iraq, I have carried around a favorite book, Nonviolent Soldier of Islam."

The book inspired the making of the 2008 film The Frontier Gandhi: Badshah Khan, a Torch for Peace, which won the top award for documentary films at the 3rd Middle East International Film Festival at Abu Dhabi in 2009. The film's director, T. C. McLuhan, stated that, upon receiving the book's first edition in 1987 from an acquaintance, "I looked at it and thought, 'I don't know anything about this part of the world,' and three weeks later, at about 3 in the morning, I picked it up and felt all the electrons around me shift."

== Editions ==
The original edition was published in English in 1984 by Nilgiri Press, and a year later by Random House. Foreign (non-English) editions have been published in Arabic, Indonesian, Italian, Korean, and Turkish.

A second edition was published 1999 in the US by Nilgiri Press, and English-language editions have been published in India. The US editions are:

- Easwaran, Eknath (1999). Nonviolent soldier of Islam: Badshah Khan, a man to match his mountains (2nd ed.). Tomales, CA: Nilgiri Press. ISBN 978-1-888314-00-7.
- Easwaran, Eknath (1985). A man to match his mountains: Badshah Khan, nonviolent soldier of Islam. New York: Random House. ISBN 978-0-394-73475-0.
- Easwaran, Eknath (1984). A man to match his mountains: Badshah Khan, nonviolent soldier of Islam (1st ed.). Tomales, CA: Nilgiri Press. ISBN 978-0-915132-33-1. "A Man to Match His Mountains 0915132346."

Indian editions:

- Easwaran, Eknath (2009). The Two Gandhis (2 ed.). Mumbai, India: Jaico. ISBN 978-81-8495-041-0.
- Easwaran, Eknath (2001). Badshah Khan: A man to match his mountains (2 ed.). India: Penguin. ISBN 978-0-14-100664-2.

== See also ==
- Gandhi the Man (by same author, a biography of Gandhi)
- Bapu (contains record of a visit with Khan and a Khudai Kitmatgir camp)
