= Seeing with the Eyes of Love =

1991 commentary on The Imitation of Christ by Eknath Easwaran

- Author: Eknath Easwaran
- Language: English; German
- Publisher: Nilgiri; Herder
- Publication date: 1991; 1996
- Pages: 268(1991); 288(1996)
- ISBN: 0915132885
- OCLC: 35114946

Seeing with the Eyes of Love by Eknath Easwaran is a practical commentary on The Imitation of Christ, a Christian devotional classic of the early 15th century, believed to be the work of Thomas à Kempis. Easwaran's commentary emphasizes how to translate the Imitation into daily living with the aid of spiritual practices. Seeing with the Eyes of Love was originally published in the United States in 1991. A German translation was published in 1993, and a second U.S. edition was published in 1996. The book has been reviewed in newspapers, magazines, and websites.

== Background ==
At the time Seeing with the Eyes of Love was published in 1991, Eknath Easwaran had served as a spiritual teacher in California since the 1960s. Easwaran taught a nonsectarian method of meditation used by spiritual aspirants within many major religious traditions, both eastern and western. Easwaran's writings include commentaries on both eastern and western scriptures and spiritual figures.

Raised in South India as a Hindu, Easwaran drew inspiration also from the Christian tradition, explaining that "the message of Christ first reached me" through the lives of individual Christians, such as his college headmaster, Father John Palakaran. For spiritual inspiration, Easwaran reported that

Initially... I was most at home with the mystics of Hinduism and Buddhism. But gradually I became conversant with those of the Christian tradition.... [and] the Imitation of Christ... seemed to me to hold a unique place in Christian mystical literature.... It is the special strength of a few books, and this is one of them, that down through the ages they have helped bridge the gap between cloister and household. Though the Imitation was composed in a monastic setting, its teachings are universally applicable...

== Content ==
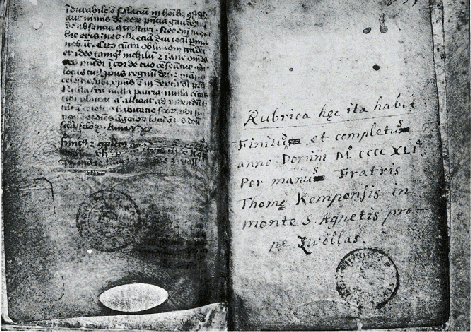
Manuscript of Imitation of Christ

Chapter Title
Verse Discussed
(from Imitation 3.5)
1.
All Shall Rejoice
Ah, Lord God, thou holy lover of my soul, when thou comest into my heart, all that is within me shall rejoice. Thou art my glory and the exultation of my heart: thou art my hope and refuge in the day of my trouble.
2.
Weak in Love
But because I am as yet weak in love, and imperfect in virtue, I have need to be strengthened and comforted by thee...
3.
Inordinate Affections
Set me free from evil passions, and heal my heart of all inordinate affections...
4.
A Great & Thorough Good
Love is a great thing, yea, a great and thorough good...
5.
Great Things
The noble love of Jesus impels one to do great things....
Love desires to be aloft....
Love desires to be free...
6.
Nothing Fuller
Nothing is sweeter than love, nothing more courageous, nothing higher, nothing wider, nothing more pleasant...
7.
He That Loveth, Runneth
He that loveth, flyeth, runneth, and rejoiceth; he is free, and cannot be held in.
He giveth all for all, and hath all in all....
He respecteth not the gifts....
8.
Love Feels No Burden
Love oftentimes knoweth no measure, but is fervent beyond all measure.
Love feels no burden....
It is therefore able to undertake all things, and it completes many things...
9.
Love is Watchful
Love is watchful, and sleeping slumbereth not.
Though weary, it is not tired...
If any one love, he knoweth what is the cry of this voice....
10.
Sing the Song of Love
Enlarge thou me in love...
Let me be possessed by love...
Let me sing the song of love....
11.
The Law of Love
Let me love thee more than myself, nor love myself but for thee: and in thee all that truly love thee, as the law of love commandeth, shining out from thyself.
12.
Love is Subject
Love is active, sincere, affectionate, pleasant, and amiable; courageous, patient, faithful, prudent, long-suffering, manly, and never seeking itself.
For in whatever instance one seeketh oneself, then he falleth from love....

The Imitation of Christ is a devotional book written in Latin ca.1418-1427, and believed to be the work of Thomas à Kempis. In Seeing with the Eyes of Love, Easwaran comments on a 30-verse section of The Imitation of Christ, a section "traditionally called 'The Wonderful Effects of Divine Love,'" (Book 3, chapter 5). To Easwaran, these verses "distill the essential teachings not just of Thomas a Kempis, but of Christianity itself." Easwaran's 12 chapters discuss these verses in order, using them as points of departure for reflections on spiritual living and its fruits. Each chapter title is drawn from an Imitation verse (see table, right).

Easwaran' introduction explains that he regards the Imitation is "an entirely practical manual for sincere spiritual aspirants," The section discussed in Seeing with the Eyes of Love is a "soaring hymn of love" that appears in Book III, when the Imitation, now an "indisputably mystical treatise," has become a dialogue between God and the spiritual aspirant, with whom "each of us, clearly, is meant to identify." Easwaran's 20-page introduction also briefly summarizes his eight-point program of Passage Meditation.

Each chapter in the main commentary offers numerous ideas and metaphors. For example, starting in the first chapter, Easwaran comments on how a person's turn to the spiritual life can be much like falling in love: "just as great worldly romances often begin with a single, telling glance, so, very often does this one... deep within you something stirs...". Later, he draws on the metaphor of travel: "Getting ready for this inward journey is a lot like preparing for a trip... You may start by reading about it.... then slowly you begin to get serious.... you know you may have to carry your own bags, so you try to keep them light and portable...."

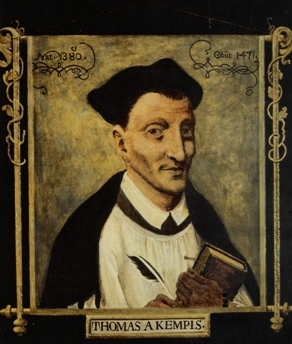
Thomas à Kempis

As the commentary proceeds in 12 chapters through the 30 Imitation verses, Easwaran often highlights what he regards as important implications of each verse. For example, with regard to the second verse in Chapter 5 ("Love desires to be aloft..."), Easwaran writes

In a sense, desire is the single most important word in this passage... Thomas is saying that through the choices we make in everyday life, we can strengthen the desire for spiritual awareness – the upward drive.... Every deep desire is a prayer, whether you spell it out to God or not. Desire is power, and when you have a deep, strong, unified desire, the power of that desire will drive you into action.... The Lord answers every selfless prayer, but the initial unification of desires is up to us...

Similarly, in Chapter 12, Easwaran addresses patience, writing that

The spiritual life calls upon us to be both patient and impatient. Without a certain measure of impatience, you're not likely to cut through all the... fetters that tie you to limited, self-willed living.... I was... impatient... in the first half of my spiritual life, almost reckless... But in the second half I came to realize that... Even to have come as far as I had was due entirely to the grace of God.

Seeing with the Eyes of Love concludes with a 22-page afterword by Carol Flinders that profiles the Imitation's presumed author, Thomas à Kempis (c. 1380 – 1471), and the times in which he lived. She states that the Imitation "is not so much the work of a single man as it is of an entire spiritual movement," the Brethren of the Common Life. Besides describing what is known about Thomas himself, the Afterword also profiles the founder of the Brethren, Geert Groote, as well as his chief disciple and successor, Florent Radewijns, who served as a mentor to Thomas. The Afterword also sketches the Imitation's influence on figures ranging from Therese of Lisieux (who memorized it) to Ignatius of Loyola to John Woolman to Dag Hammarskjöld, who carried it with him on the flight that ended in his death.

An 8-page index is contained in the 1996 edition.

== Reception ==
Reviews have appeared in the Prairie Messenger, BC Catholic, The Living Church, Monastic Interreligious Dialogue, The Small Press Book Review, Brothers, and at the website "Spirituality and Practice."

In Prairie Messenger, a Roman Catholic publication, J. W. Gray stated that "Far from losing himself in mystical romanticism, Easwaran insists throughout that what one discovers within unites one with the community." Indeed,

The reflections on the Imitation passages are rich with Easwaran's familiarity with the writings of many other mystics and his own corroborating experiences. Meister Eckhart, Teresa of Avila, St. Augustine, St. Bernard, St. John of the Cross, M.K. Gandhi, St. Thérèse of Lisieux, mystical authorities of the East, all are at home in these chapters. A common emphasis is on overcoming self-will, achieved normally, he insists, by living and working harmoniously with other people.

He added that "The simplicity, sincerity and compassion so clear in these reflections will convince the wavering to take up Easwaran's challenge."

In The Living Church, an Episcopalian magazine, Travis DuPriest stated that he "particularly liked [Easwaran's] introduction with practical advice on meditation, spiritual reading and spiritual association," calling Seeing with the Eyes of Love a "well-written book with a strong focus on the love of God."

In The B.C. Catholic, Paul Matthew St. Pierre described Seeing with the Eyes of Love as an "understated work" in which the author "does not second-guess Thomas a Kempis for us." But Easwaran "manages to open up the mind and spirit of Thomas a Kempis and to awaken people created in the image and likeness of God to the possibilities of imitating Jesus." He later added that in Seeing with the Eyes of Love, "Easwaran untangles a meditative paradox of imitative faith and observance that draws people to the actuality of Jesus Christ."

A reviewer in The Small Press Book Review stated that "woven into [Easwaran's] commentary are biographical anecdotes, references to mystics of different religions and their writings, advice on meditating, and observations on contemporary life. The variety of the subjects provides the reader with different angles on the fertile and fulfilling life of the spirit Easwaran illuminates."

A reviewer in Monastic Interreligious Dialogue called Seeing with the Eyes of Love a "gem," stating that it "shows that there is much more to the [Imitation] than the pious rhetoric of an age of Jansenism. It centers on the basic theme of Love."

In Brothers, a Catholic monastic publication, Romeo Bonsaint stated that in addition to his reflections on the Imitation, "Easwaran's meditations on the power of divine love provide insightful glimpses as well into the teachings on love of many other Christian mystics, among them such figures as St. Augustine, St. Teresa of Avila, Johannes Tauler, and Mechtild of Magdeburg. These many references to spiritual writers and teachers effectively communicate the essential teaching of Christianity on personality integration and service through love."

== Editions ==
The original edition was published by in the United States in 1991 by Nilgiri Press, who republished a 2nd edition in 1996 as one volume in a series entitled Classics of Christian Inspiration. An edition was also published in German in 1993. The US editions of Seeing with the Eyes of Love are:

- Eknath, Easwaran; Carol L. Flinders (1996). Seeing with the eyes of love : Eknath Easwaran on the imitation of Christ (2nd ed.). Tomales, CA: Nilgiri Press. ISBN 0915132885., ISBN 0915132877, OCLC 35114946 (288 pages)

- Eknath, Eknath; Carol L. Flinders (1991). Seeing with the eyes of love: Reflections on a classic of Christian mysticism (1st ed.). Tomales, CA: Nilgiri Press. ISBN 0915132656. ISBN 0915132648, OCLC 24173371 (268 pages)

The German edition:

- Easwaran, Eknath (1993). Mit den Augen der Liebe: Nachfolge Christi mit Thomas von Kempen. Freiburg, Germany: Herder. ISBN 3451230739. ISBN 9783451230738, OCLC 75343114 (259 pages)

== See also ==
- Original Goodness
- Love Never Faileth
