= BSTS =

BSTS may refer to:

- Bulletin of Science, Technology & Society, a bimonthly peer-reviewed academic journal that publishes papers in the field of science education
- Boost Surveillance and Tracking System (BSTS), a US effort to track missiles during the 1980s and 1990s
- Bayesian structural time series, a statistical technique
