= God Makes the Rivers to Flow =

1982 anthology by Eknath Easwaran

- Cover of complete edition, 2009
- Author: Eknath Easwaran
- Language: English (also translated into French)
- Genre: religious, spiritual
- Publisher: Nilgiri, Jaico, Éditions Fides
- Publication date: 1982; 2009; others
- Media type: book; ebook; audio
- Pages: 96 (1982); 334 (2009)
- ISBN: 978-1-58638-038-0
- OCLC: 351322283

God Makes the Rivers to Flow is an anthology of spiritual texts for use in meditation, assembled by Eknath Easwaran. Condensed versions have been published under the titles Timeless Wisdom (book) and Sacred Literature of the World (audio recording). First published as a book in the US in 1982, progressively enlarged or revised versions of God Makes the Rivers to Flow were also issued in the US in 1991, 2003, and 2009. English editions have been published in India, and a French edition has been published. The book has been reviewed in newspapers, magazines, professional journals, and websites, and utilized in research studies and education.

== Background ==
For nearly four decades, Easwaran taught a method of meditation, known as passage meditation, which involves focusing the mind on inspiring sacred texts, such as the 23rd Psalm or the Buddha's Discourse on Good Will. Throughout this time, he received inquiries about whether various texts were suitable passages for meditation. He taught that passages should meet the criteria he had learned to trust in his own practice: a passage should be "positive, practical, universal, and inspiring". and drawn from a scripture or a person whose words and life attest to spiritual realization. God Makes the Rivers to Flow grew as a collection of such passages.

== Topics covered ==
All US editions of God Makes the Rivers to Flow and its derivatives contain an introduction, plus numerous 1- to 3- or more page selections of spiritual texts from many traditions. Examples of spiritual texts are shown in the table at right.

Examples of Inspirational Passages
(God Makes the Rivers to Flow)

Prayer of Saint Francis

Lord, make me an instrument of thy peace

Where there is hatred let me sow love...

The Shema (Torah)

Hear, O Israel, the Lord our God, the Lord is one...

And these words... shall be upon your heart, and you shall teach them always to your children...

Discourse on Good Will (Sutta Nipata)

May all beings be filled with joy and peace...

Just as a mother with her own life protects her child... So within yourself let grow a boundless love for all creatures...

Let Nothing Upset You (Teresa of Avila)

Let nothing upset you; Let nothing frighten you.

Everything is changing; God alone is changeless...

Sermon on the Mount (New Testament)

Blessed are the poor in spirit: for theirs is the kingdom of heaven.

Blessed are they that mourn: for they shall be comforted...

Hymn to the Divine Mother (Chandi)

...O thou the savior of all who take refuge in thee,

The lowly and the distressed – O Mother Divine, we salute thee...

The Deepest Part of Thy Soul (William Law)

Though God be everywhere present, yet He is only present to thee in the deepest and most central part of thy soul....

This depth is... so infinite that nothing can satisfy it or give it any rest but the infinity of God.

Let Me Walk in Beauty (Chief Yellow Lark)

O Great Spirit, whose voice I hear in the winds...

I am small and weak. I need your strength and wisdom...

Twin Verses (Dhammapada)

All that we are is the result of what we have thought:

We are formed and molded by our thoughts...

I Come to Him Running (Mishkat al-Masabih)

The Prophet said, God Most High has said:

When my worshipper's thoughts turn to Me, there I am with him... and if he come to Me walking, I come to him running...

The Path (Mahatma Gandhi)

I know the path: it is strait and narrow...

I rejoice to walk on it. I weep when I slip. God's word is: "He who strives never perishes"...

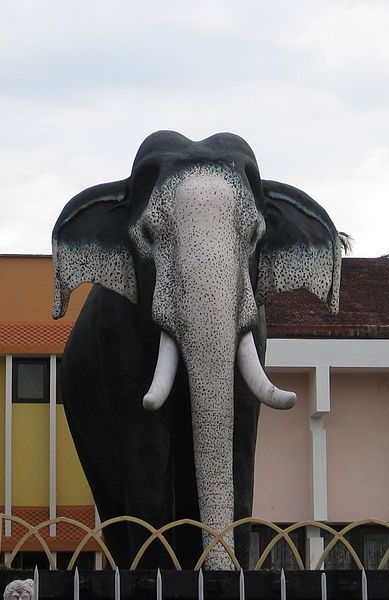
Statue of devout elephant

Easwaran's Introduction uses a sculptural metaphor to explain how passages can be used beneficially in meditation. He tells the story of an ancient Indian sculptor who was renowned for vivid representations of elephants. His secret, the sculptor explained, was that after quarrying a giant rock,

"for a long time, I do nothing but observe... and study it from every angle. I focus all my concentration on this task... At first, I see nothing but a huge and shapeless rock... Then slowly, very slowly, I... feel a presentiment... an outline, scarcely discernible, shows itself to me... An elephant is stirring in there!... I now know the one thing I must do:... I must chip away every last bit of stone that is not elephant. What then remains will be, must be, elephant."

Similarly, Easwaran says, meditation helps us to reveal "our higher self... [a] spark of divinity [that] is to be found in the heart of each human being.... [by] resolutely chip[ping] away whatever is not divine in ourselves." This process is neither easy or quick, and "can't be done in a week or by the weak." But "whatever our tradition, we are inheritors of straightforward spiritual practices [that] vary a bit from culture to culture... but essentially... are the same." Meditation is the most potent practice, enabling us to "see the lineaments of our true self":

In meditation, the inspirational passage is the chisel, our concentration is the hammer.... When we use our will to drive the thin edge of the passage deep into consciousness, we get the purchase to pry loose tenacious habits and negative attitudes. The passage, whether it is from the Bhagavad Gita or The Imitation of Christ or the Dhammapada of the Buddha, has been tempered in the flames of mystical experience...

According to Easwaran, "the great principle upon which meditation rests is that we become what we meditate on." This, he says, is consistent with our experience that even in everyday life, we are shaped by what occupies our thoughts – for example, if we spend most of our time "studying the market, checking the money rates, evaluating our portfolios, we are going to become money-people." Thus, in selecting meditation passages, Easwaran has "aimed for the highest the human being is capable of, the most noble and elevating truths that have ever been expressed on this planet." Indeed,

The test of suitable meditation passages is simply this: Does the passage bear the imprint of deep, personal spiritual experience? Is it the statement of one who went beyond the narrow confines of past conditioning into the unfathomable recesses of the mind, there to begin the great work of transformation?.... whatever lacks this validation by personal experience, however poetic or imaginative... is not suited for use in meditation.

He also states that passages should be "life affirming," and encourages building a varied repertoire of passages that can "guard against overfamiliarity.... [and] match a passage to your particular need at the time."

The 2nd and 3rd editions contain several supplementary sections:

- A description of 8-point program of passage meditation recommended by Easwaran, involving silently and slowly focusing the mind on memorized or previously known passages (6 pages)
- A post-script on the "Message of the Scriptures," describing the goal of meditation as a "deathless state of Self-realization.... the message of every major scripture [and] the testimony of mystics everywhere, East or West." (3 pages)
- The author's statement of what he believes separates the book from other sacred literature collections: that it functions as an instrument for transforming one's life. He states he can "testify from my own experience [that the passages] have the power to remake personality in the image of one's highest ideals." ("Preface," 1 page)
- Indices by source, title, and first line
- Biographical and bibliographic notes on passage sources

"How to Use This Book" subsections:
(God Makes the Rivers to Flow, 3rd ed.)

The Power of the Word

Notes examples and views from major faith traditions of the transforming power of sacred words, including

•

"In the beginning was the Word, and the Word was with God, and the Word was God," declares Saint John...

...[and] in the Rig Veda...

•

"In the beginning was Prajapati [God the Creator], with whom was the Word. The Word was verily the supreme Brahman [God the Transcendent]."

...sixth century pope Gregory the Great has described how...

•

"It is God who speaks to us.... he who makes us hear them today already had us in mind when he inspired them of old..."

Lectio divina

Explains how to use the passages for lectio divina, an ancient Christian practice.

•
To practice lectio divina with this book... Choose a passage and read it through slowly... reflect... Are there any words or phrases that seem especially significant...?

Lectio continua

Explains that lectio divina, if "practiced frequently in an organized sequence of readings... becomes lectio continua, an ongoing and systematic review of inspired texts";

•
the main difference between works of literature and works of mysticism [is] you can read the mystics over and over again and have the impact at a deeper and deeper level

•
spiritual passages in this book have been arranged as a lectionary of the perennial philosophy.... You might find it helpful to keep a journal...

Passage meditation

Practical dynamics of passage meditation, viewed as offering "the deepest level of engagement with the material."

•
most of us in the modern world do not have the supportive framework of the great liturgical cultures that provide continuous nourishment... as ubiquitous and available in the past as modern advertising is in our own times.

•
We need a way to draw the power of the word down into the crucible of consciousness...

•
Memory is a mental muscle which gets stronger with use.... Some people are auditory learners.... You might try getting together with other auditory learners.... Visual learners seem to do better with silently reading...

The 3rd edition – published originally in 2003, and revised in 2009 – also contains:

- "How to Use This Book," with subsections on: The power of the word, and on methods of using passages for lectio divina, lectio continua, and passage meditation (12 pages) (see Table at right).
- "Recommended Passages for Specific Uses," which suggests lists of especially helpful passages for particular stages of life (e.g., expectant mothers, caregivers, illness); for building specific positive qualities (e.g., patience, compassion, courage, devotion); or addressing and changing specific negative patterns of thinking (e.g., anger, fear, jealousy, greed). (6 pages)

The condensed edition (Timeless Wisdom, 2008) contains about half of the 3rd edition's passages, plus its Introduction, and a new 6-page preface, "In the Company of Saints & Sages," offering examples of how passages can function as a "mirror for helping us translate the lofty vision of the world's great spiritual traditions" into our daily lives.

== Reviews and influence ==
Reviews have appeared in the International Journal of Humanities & Peace, Resurgence, New Age Journal, Prairie Messenger, BC Catholic, Fellowship in Prayer, The Times of India, India-West, and elsewhere.

In The International Journal of Humanities & Peace, Carol Burke wrote that God Makes the Rivers to Flow (2003) contains "rich resources" that offer "much to satisfy even the most restless mind." In addition to the "vast assortment of inspiring passages," the section on using passages for specific purposes is "practical," the biographical notes are "interesting," and the introduction "entertainingly encourages" readers to begin personal transformation. Burke states that many passage sources will be familiar, but "many other passages perhaps less familiar, from Hinduism, Buddhism, Islam, and the Sufi and Native American traditions... are equally inspiring." She adds that "in this reviewer's opinion, it is regrettable that nothing appears from the eloquent Nez Perce leader Chief Joseph."

In Resurgence, Marian van Eyk McCain wrote that "it feels refreshingly ecumenical to see sacred texts from many different wisdom traditions gathering peaceably between two covers." God Makes the Rivers to Flow "contains old favorites like the Prayer of St Francis," verses from well-known scriptures, psalms, prayers, poems, two Native American pieces, and selections from "many... individual sages like Gandhi, Shankara, Hildegard, Thomas à Kempis and Hazrat Inayat Khan." McCain also warned those "like me" with an aversion to a "preponderance of male pronouns" that "The divine feminine is seriously under-represented here (less than five percent) and only one fifth of the pieces are gender-neutral." In response, a letter from a reader, Margaret Purrett, also published by Resurgence, argued that "meditators need to be tolerant of metaphors for divinity and gender usage from the past. I would not like to be prevented from enjoying and using the Bhagavad Gita, the Vedas, Dhammapada, or the Psalms merely because of references to male pronouns. Would anyone?" Purrett stated that "In fact, Eknath Easwaran made new translations of many passages to make them more neutral for this last edition, and he changed many of the masculine singulars to neutral plurals."

The Times of India described the passages in God Makes the Rivers to Flow as "positive and practical, inspiring and life-affirming," "alive with the charge of mystical awareness," and having "the power to change your life."

Prairie Messenger, a Roman Catholic publication, stated that "these texts should have wide-ranging appeal since they are devoted to catching a glimpse of our inner being. Having taught meditation for over 30 years, Easwaran knows the importance of texts, the discipline of mental training, the use of a mantram, a holy formula, and daily meditation periods.... Easwaran is a faithful guide."

Reviewing the audio edition (1995), Fellowship in Prayer stated that "There is no end to the beauty that pours forth from the Blue Mountain Meditation Center in California, where Sri Eknath Easwaran continues to weave the golden threads of his ministry." The reviewer described the audio as "magnificent," stating that "the depths of Easwaran's great soul brings each text to its most full expression of beauty and holiness... one has a sense of huge ocean waves rolling slowly, quietly, softly, timelessly, onto a distant shore.... My heart overflows with gratitude."

In B.C. Catholic's review of the audio edition (1995), Paul Matthew St. Pierre stated that "All of them [the passages] are spiritually thrilling both in their content and as read aloud by Easwaran." St. Pierre stated that "My own position... is that works of literature are to be read aloud, to be assigned a voice," and that

Having now listened (twice!) to all 170 minutes of readings, I feel confident in stating that this tape will stand up to repeated "hearings" from audiences interested in ecumenical Scriptures and holy books by saints and mystics, and in particular audiences looking for inspiration and dedicated to meditation.

New Age Journal stated that "as an attractive sampler of sacred literature [the book] would be impressive enough. But these passages were chosen... for their transformative power.... The meanings and rhythms of the selections are calming. Their beauty inevitably emanates from their simplicity."

India-West stated that the book "fills an important void in our lives.... The passages chosen are practical, positive and universal in appeal and of great literary beauty."

BC Catholic's review of the 3rd edition (2003) stated that "This would be a wonderful book to help with one's Advent preparation and discipline... the book is designed for lectio divina and meditation.... the book... will fill readers with a sense of wonder, mostly obviously because it collects profoundly inspirational passages... but also because it demands that readers study the passages deferentially, with reverence." It mentioned many passages as comprising "Catholic content," and stated that

All the content, from all the faith traditions, in the spirit of ecumenism, is deeply inspirational. For example, the 'Invocations' of Ansari of Herat.... "O Lord, give me that right discrimination / That the lure of the world may cheat me no more. Give me strength / That my faith suffer no eclipse." This prayer evokes not only the penitence of Ramadan (Islam's month of fasting...) but also the preparation and discipline of Advent.

Excerpts from the book have been quoted or reproduced in journals, magazines, and numerous books. Large portions of the introduction were reproduced in 2008 in Yoga Journal.

== Research and education ==
God Makes the Rivers to Flow has been used as instructional materials in scientific studies of Easwaran's Passage Meditation among health professionals and college undergraduates. Educational psychologists have used the book in college courses to foster learning from "spiritual models" – people, such as the authors of the passages, who exemplify spiritual qualities. The passages were viewed as providing spiritual "modeling information."

== Editions ==
The original edition was published as a printed book in 1982 by Nilgiri Press. Additional English-language versions, sometimes condensed, or in electronic or audio recording form, have been published in the US and India. A translation has also been published in French.

The English-language editions are:

- Eknath, Eknath (2009). God makes the rivers to flow: an anthology of the world's sacred poetry & prose (3rd, revised ed.). Tomales, CA: Nilgiri Press. ISBN 978-1-58638-038-0. (334 pages); ISBN 1-58638-038-9, OCLC 351322283
- Eknath, Eknath (2003). God Makes the Rivers to Flow: Sacred Literature of the World / Selected by Eknath Easwaran (3rd ed.). Tomales, CA: Nilgiri Press. ISBN 978-1-58638-008-3. (332 pages); ISBN 1-58638-008-7, OCLC 56541933

- Also as e-book (2003): OCLC 632757795

- Eknath, Eknath (1991). God Makes the Rivers to Flow: Selections from the Sacred Literature of the World / Chosen for Daily Meditation by Eknath Easwaran (2nd ed.). Tomales, CA: Nilgiri Press. ISBN 0-915132-69-9. (207 pages); ISBN 0-915132-68-0 (paper) OCLC 24373242
- Eknath, Eknath (1982). God Makes the Rivers to Flow: Passages for Meditation Selected by Eknath Easwaran (1st ed.). Petaluma, CA: Nilgiri Press. ISBN 0-915132-28-1. (96 pages); ISBN 0-915132-29-X (paper) OCLC 8475279

Condensed:

- Eknath, Eknath (2008). Timeless wisdom: passages for meditation from the world's saints & sages (1st ed.). Tomales, CA: Nilgiri Press. ISBN 978-1-58638-027-4. (227 pages); ISBN 1-58638-027-3, OCLC 209590564

- Also as e-book (2008): ISBN 978-1-58638-031-1, ISBN 1-58638-031-1 OCLC 645940062

Audio:

- Eknath, Eknath (1995). Sacred literature of the world: [inspirational passages] [read by Eknath Easwaran]. Tomales, CA: Nilgiri Press. ISBN 978-0-915132-80-5. (Audio book: 2 sound cassettes, 170 min.; 1 pamphlet. 15 pages); ISBN 0-915132-80-X, OCLC 32902296

Indian editions (condensed and full):

- Eknath, Eknath (2009). Timeless wisdom: passages for meditation from the world's saints and sages. Mumbai, India: Jaico. ISBN 978-81-7992-950-6. (227 pages); ISBN 81-7992-950-7, OCLC 421024277
- Eknath, Eknath (2004). God makes the rivers to flow: sacred literature of the world. Mumbai, India: Jaico. ISBN 978-81-7992-330-6. (332 pages); ISBN 81-7992-330-4, OCLC 428014291
- Eknath, Eknath (1997). Sacred literature of the world. Mumbai, India: Jaico. ISBN 978-81-7224-582-5. (208 pages); ISBN 81-7224-582-3

French edition:

- Eknath, Eknath (1997). Les grands textes spirituels du monde entire. Marie-Annick Thabaud (trans.). Saint-Laurent, Québec, Canada: Les Éditions Fides. ISBN 978-2-7621-2002-8. (247 pages); ISBN 2-7621-2002-0, OCLC 37490962
