= Easwaran =

Easwaran or Eswaran is an Indian surname and may refer to:

- Abhimanyu Easwaran (born 1995), Indian first-class cricketer
- Eknath Easwaran (1910–1999), Indian-born spiritual teacher and author
- K. R. K. Easwaran (born 1939), Indian molecular biophysicist
- Kenny Easwaran, American Indian philosopher
- Mannargudi Easwaran (born 1947), contemporary mridangam player and Carnatic musician
- E. R. Eswaran (born 1961), Indian politician and entrepreneur
- Kapali Eswaran, one of the founding members of the IBM System R Project
- R. Eswaran, Indian politician
- Vijay Eswaran (born 1960), Malaysian businessman
