= Beatitudes =

Part of Jesus' sermon on the mount

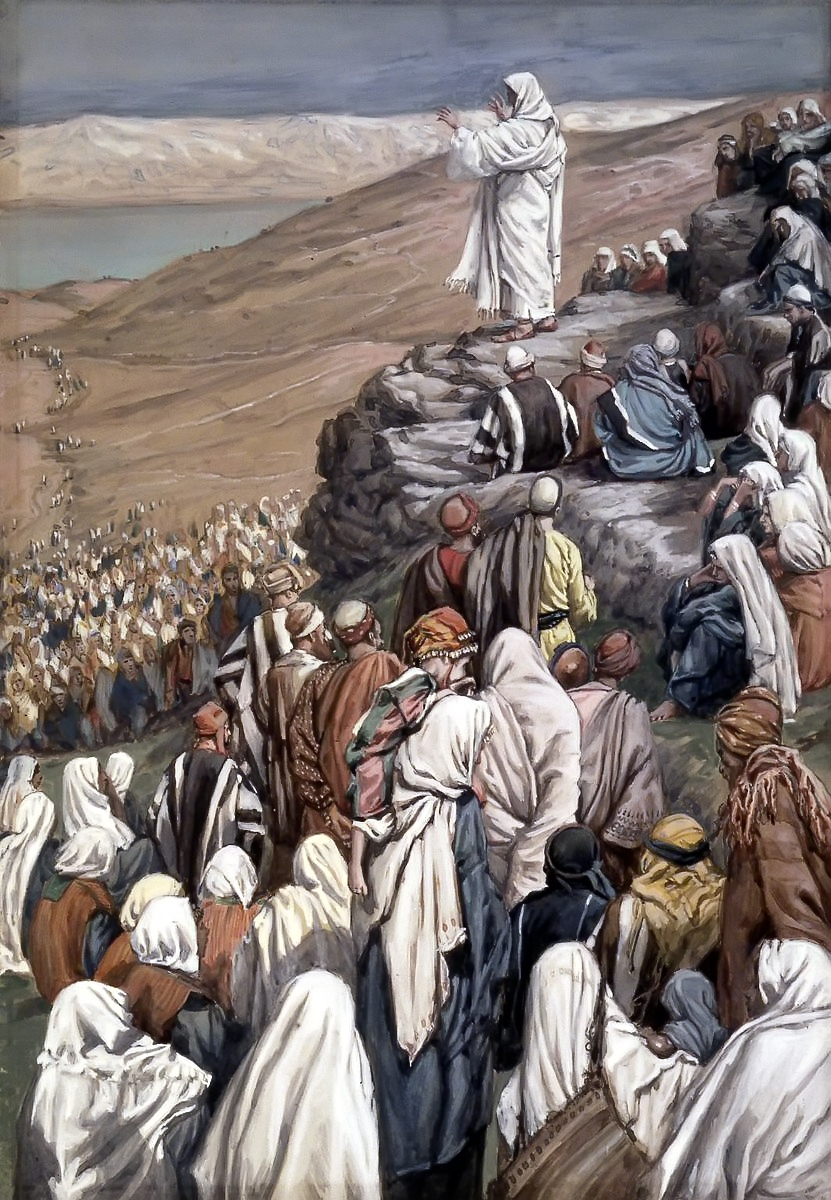
James Tissot, The Beatitudes Sermon, c. 1890, Brooklyn Museum

The Beatitudes (/biˈætɪtjudz/) are eight or nine blessings recounted by Jesus in Matthew 5:3–10 within the Sermon on the Mount in the Gospel of Matthew, and four in the Sermon on the Plain in the Gospel of Luke, followed by four woes which mirror the blessings.

In the Latin Vulgate, each of these blessings begins with the word beātī, which translates to 'blessed' (plural adjective). The corresponding word in the original Greek is μακάριοι (makarioi), with the same meaning. (Note: "[T]he name of "Makaria", the "blessed" or "prosperous" one— ...as well as the family's membership in the upper classes.) Thus "Blessed are the poor in spirit" appears in Latin as beātī pauperēs spīritū. The Latin noun beātitūdō was coined by Cicero to describe a state of blessedness and was later incorporated within the chapter headings written for Matthew 5 in various printed versions of the Vulgate. Subsequently, the word was anglicised to beatytudes in the Great Bible of 1540, and has, over time, taken on a preferred spelling of beatitudes.

While some opinions can differ as to exactly how many distinct statements into which the Beatitudes should be divided (ranging from eight to ten), most scholars consider them to be only eight. These eight of Matthew follow a simple pattern: Jesus names a group of people normally thought to be unfortunate and pronounces them blessed.

== Matthew 5:3–12 ==
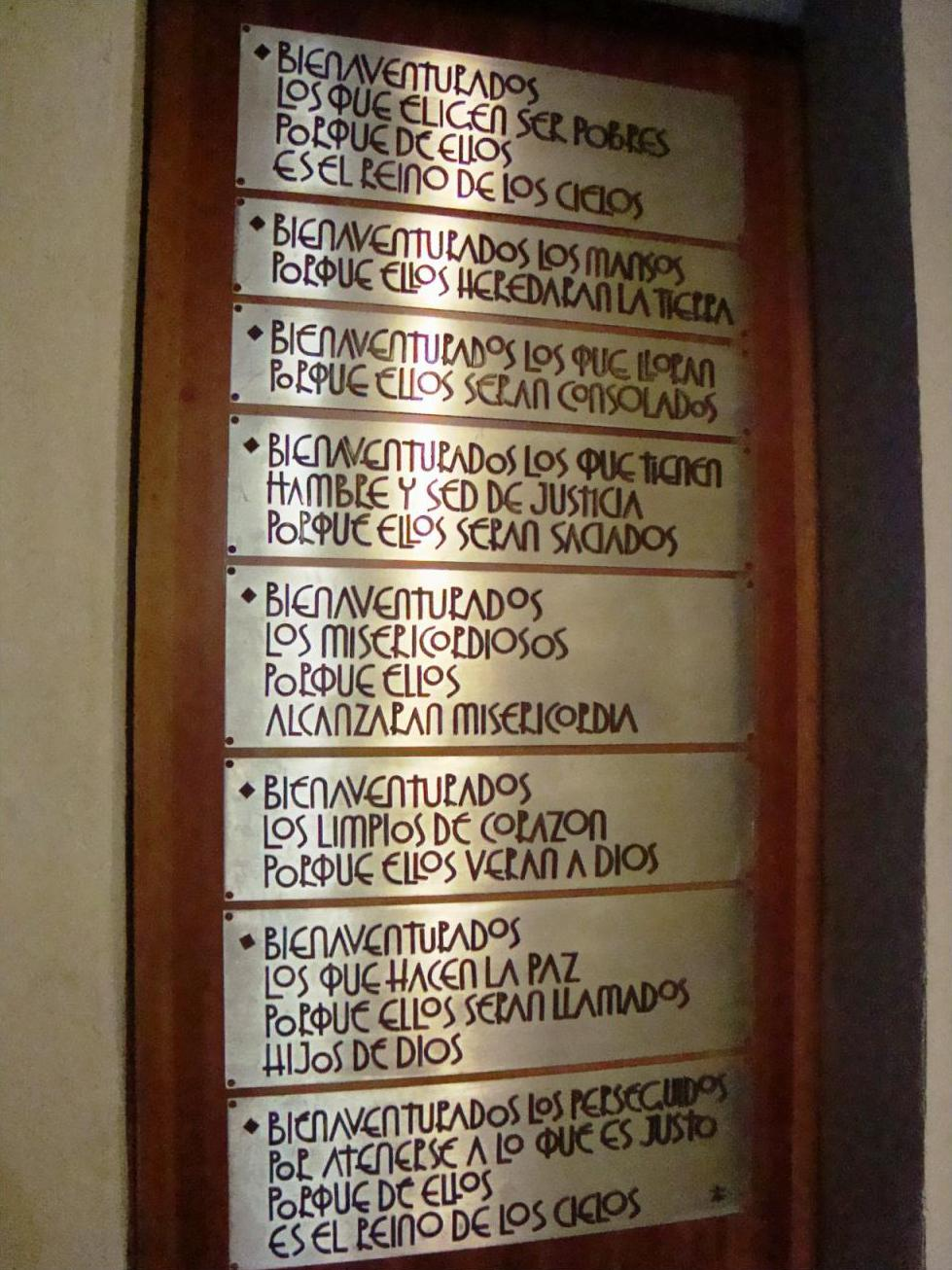
Plaque of the Eight beatitudes, St. Cajetan Church, Lindavista, Mexico

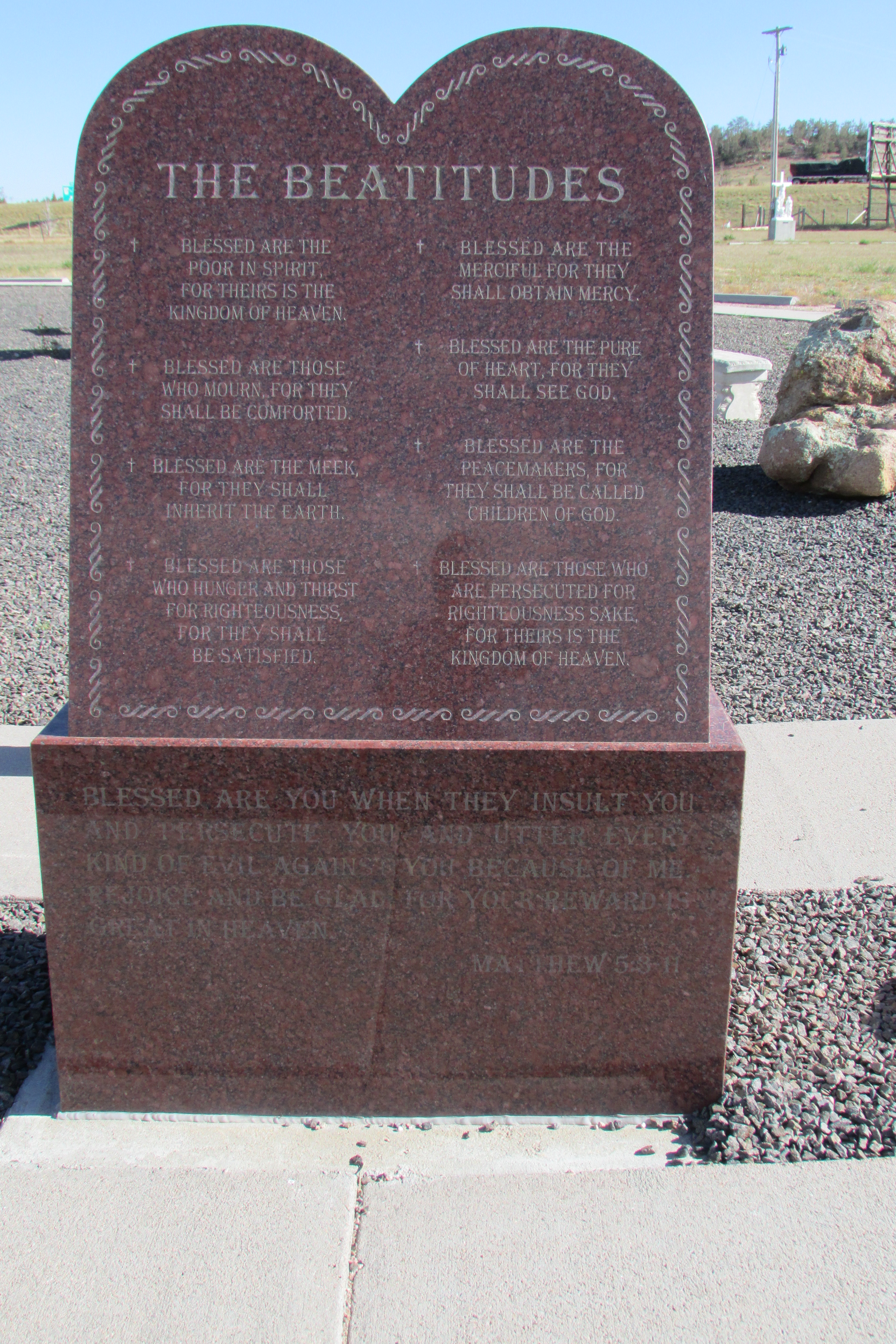
Text of the Beatitudes at Our Lady of Peace Shrine, along I-80 in Pine Bluffs, Wyoming (2016)

The nine Beatitudes in Matthew:

^{3}Blessed are the poor in spirit,
for theirs is the Kingdom of Heaven.
^{4}Blessed are those who mourn,
for they will be comforted.
^{5}Blessed are the meek,
for they will inherit the Earth.
^{6}Blessed are those who hunger and thirst for righteousness,
for they will be satisfied.
^{7}Blessed are the merciful,
for they will be shown mercy.
^{8}Blessed are the pure in heart,
for they will see God.
^{9}Blessed are the peacemakers,
for they will be called the Sons of God.
^{10}Blessed are those who are persecuted because of righteousness,
for theirs is the Kingdom of Heaven.
^{11}Blessed are you when people insult you, persecute you and falsely say all kinds of evil against you because of Me.
^{12}Rejoice and be glad, because great is your reward in heaven, for in the same way they persecuted the prophets who were before you...

The ninth beatitude (Matthew 5:11–12) refers to the bearing of reviling and is addressed to the disciples. R.T. France considers verses 11 and 12 to be based on Isaiah 51:7.

The Beatitudes unique to Matthew are the meek, the merciful, the pure of heart, and the peacemakers, while the other four have similar entries in Luke, but are followed almost immediately by "four woes". The term "poor in spirit" is unique to Matthew. While thematically similar, the introduction of the phrase "Poor in spirit" spiritualizes or ethicizes the poor in their predicament (in alignment with Isaiah 61), while the Lucan version focuses on their actual hardship, poverty, marginalization and rejection of the poor who will see eventual vindication.

== Luke ==
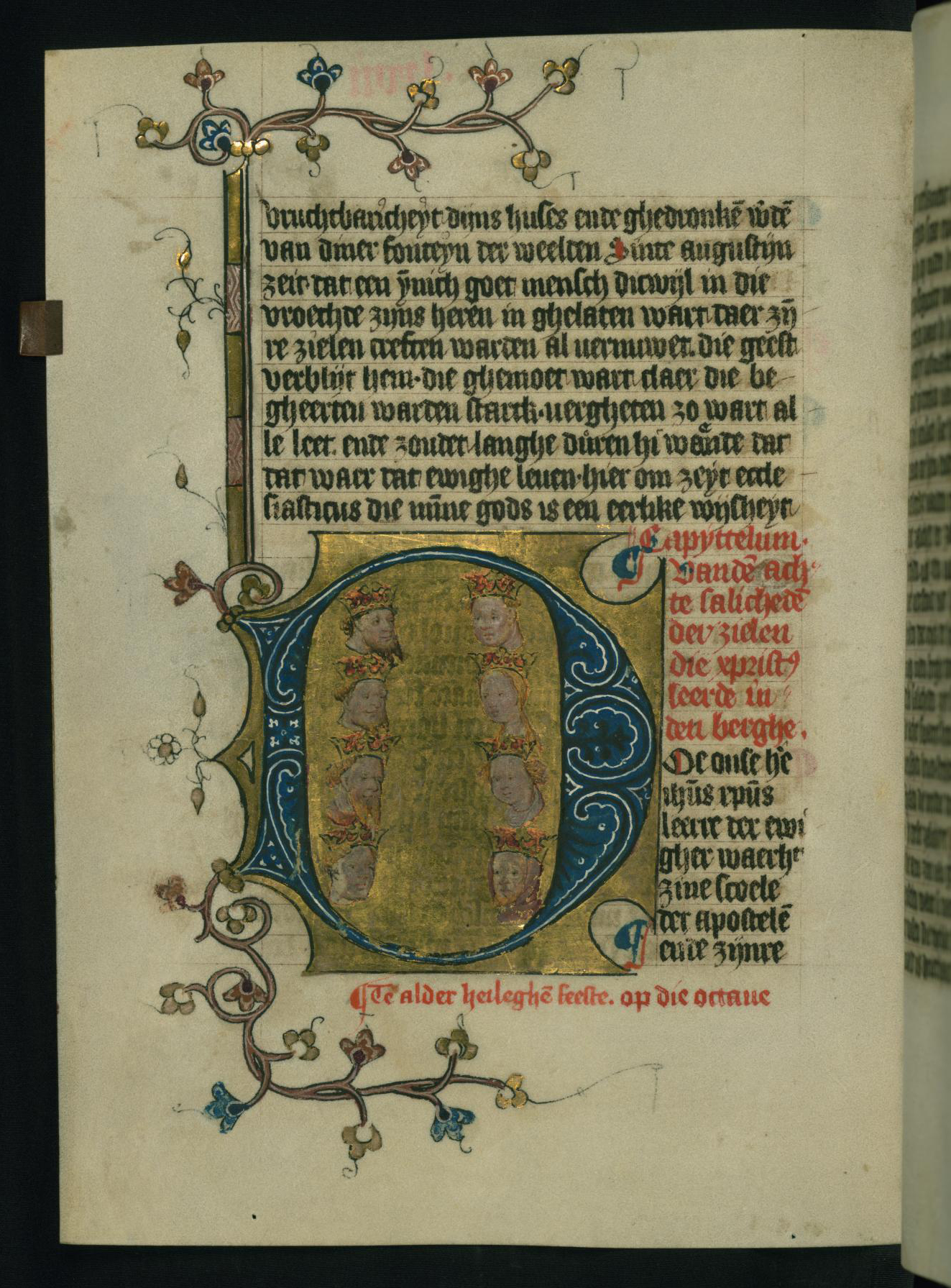
The Eight Beatitudes. Folio from Walters manuscript W.171 (15th century)

The four Beatitudes in Luke 6:20–22 are set within the Sermon on the Plain.

^{20}Looking at his disciples, he said:

"Blessed are you who are poor,
for yours is the kingdom of God.
^{21}Blessed are you who hunger now,
for you will be satisfied.
Blessed are you who weep now,
for you will laugh.
^{22}Blessed are you when people hate you,
when they exclude you and insult you
and reject your name as evil,
because of the Son of Man.

Luke 6:23 ("Rejoice in that day and leap for joy, because great is your reward in heaven. For that is how their ancestors treated the prophets.") appears to parallel the text in Matthew 5:11–12.

The four woes that follow in Luke 6:24–26

^{24}"But woe to you who are rich,
for you have already received your comfort.
^{25}Woe to you who are well fed now,
for you will go hungry.
Woe to you who laugh now,
for you will mourn and weep.
^{26}Woe to you when everyone speaks well of you,
for that is how their ancestors treated the false prophets.

These woes are distinct from the Seven Woes of the Pharisees which appear later in Luke 11:37–54.

== Analysis and interpretation ==
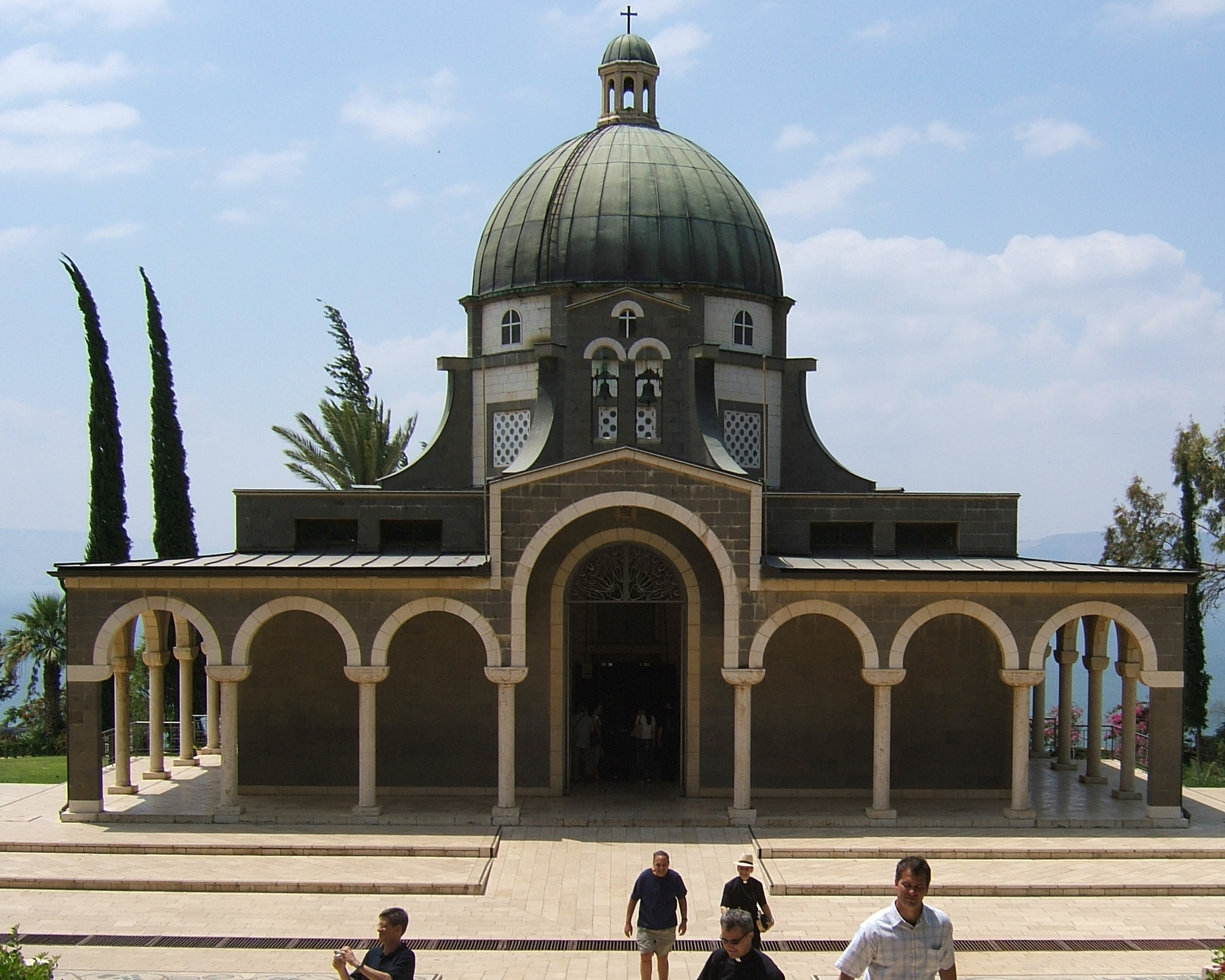
Church of the Beatitudes, the traditional location for the Sermon on the Mount

Each Beatitude consists of two phrases: the condition and the result. In almost all cases the phrases used are familiar from an Old Testament context, but in the Sermon on the Mount Jesus elevates them to new levels and teachings. Together, the Beatitudes present a new set of ideals that focus on love and humility rather than force and exaction. They echo the highest ideals of Jesus' teachings on spirituality and compassion.

A minority interpretation, advanced by philosopher and theologian Dallas Willard (1935–2013), rejects the view that the Beatitudes follow a condition–result formula. Rather, Willard reads both the Matthean and Lukan versions of the Beatitudes as pronouncements of blessing upon a representative list of individuals considered unblessable by the prevailing assumptions of their time and place. In this reading, Jesus is proclaiming that even such people are blessed in spite of their condition, because the Kingdom of Heaven is now available to them. For Willard, the Matthean Beatitudes (Matt. 5–7) function as an extension of the gospel Jesus had already proclaimed in the immediately preceding chapter (Matt. 4:17; 4:23–24). Willard addresses the expected objection that not all of the qualities listed in Matthew 5 are obviously negative, engaging the relevant Greek terms and developing the full argument in The Divine Conspiracy, ch. 4, p. 119. A broadly similar reading had been offered earlier by Alfred Edersheim (1825–1889) in his Life and Times of Jesus the Messiah. Proponents of this interpretation argue that it also resolves longstanding difficulties with specific beatitudes, such as "poor in spirit."

The term the meek would be familiar in the Old Testament, e.g., as in Psalm 37:11. Although the Beatitude concerning the meek has been much praised even by some non-Christians such as Mahatma Gandhi, some view the admonition to meekness skeptically. Friedrich Nietzsche in On the Genealogy of Morals considered the verse to be embodying what he perceived as a slave morality.

In Christian teachings, the works of mercy (good acts that are considered meritorious) have resonated with the theme of the Beatitude for mercy. These teachings emphasise that these acts of mercy provide both temporal and spiritual benefits.

The term peacemakers has traditionally been interpreted to mean not only those who live in peace with others, but also those who do their best to promote friendship among humanity and between God and man. St. Gregory of Nyssa interpreted it as "Godly work", which was an imitation of God's love of man. John Wesley said the peacemakers "endeavour to calm the stormy spirits of men, to quiet their turbulent passions, to soften the minds of contending parties, and, if possible, reconcile them to each other. They use all innocent arts, and employ all their strength, all the talents which God has given them, as well to preserve peace where it is, as to restore it where it is not."

The phrase "poor in spirit" (πτωχοὶ τῷ πνεύματι) in Matthew 5:3 has been subject to a variety of interpretations. A.W. Tozer describes poverty of spirit as "an inward state paralleling the outward circumstances of the common beggar in the streets." It is not a call to material poverty, but to an awareness of spiritual need—the idea being that when one recognizes how much one needs God, God will satisfy that need by giving himself. Conversely, those who do not believe they need God will not find him revealed to them.

These blessed poor are no longer slaves to the tyranny of things. They have broken the yoke of the oppressor; and this they have done not by fighting but by surrendering. Though free from all sense of possessing, they yet possess all things. "Theirs is the kingdom of heaven."

— A. W. Tozer, The Pursuit of God, The Blessedness of Possessing Nothing, page 23

William Burnet Wright, seeking to avoid a common misunderstanding of the meaning of poverty of spirit, distinguishes those who are "poor in spirit" from those he calls "poor spirited," who "consider crawling the Christian's proper gait."

There are men who fear to call their souls their own, and if they did, they would deceive—themselves. At times such men baptize their cowardice in holy water, name it humility, and tremble. ...They are not blessed. Their life is a creeping paralysis. Afraid to stand for their convictions, they end by having no convictions to stand to.

== In other religious texts ==
Also in the New Testament, the Epistle of James contains a verse which is worded in much the same way as the Beatitudes; and which shares themes particularly with Matthew 5:10,12:

Blessed is the one who perseveres under trial because, having stood the test, that person will receive the crown of life that the Lord has promised to those who love Him. (James 1:12)

In the Book of Mormon, a religious text of the Latter Day Saint movement, Jesus delivers a sermon to a group of people in the Americas shortly after His death and resurrection. This event, believed by adherents to be part of Christ's visit to the Americas around the year 34, is recorded in 3 Nephi 12, where Jesus teaches a version of the Beatitudes similar to that found in Matthew 5.

^{3} Yea, blessed are the poor in spirit who come unto me, for theirs is the kingdom of heaven. ^{4} And blessed are all they that mourn, for they shall be comforted. ^{5} And blessed are the meek, for they shall inherit the earth. ^{6} And blessed are all they who do hunger and thirst after righteousness, for they shall be filled with the Holy Ghost. ^{7} And blessed are the merciful, for they shall obtain mercy. ^{8} And blessed are all the pure in heart, for they shall see God. ^{9} And blessed are all the peacemakers, for they shall be called the children of God. ^{10} And blessed are all they who are persecuted for my name's sake, for theirs is the kingdom of heaven.

Though the teachings in 3 Nephi 12 closely mirror the Beatitudes in Matthew, the Book of Mormon version emphasizes the importance of baptism and receiving the Holy Ghost, which is seen as central to the blessings. Additionally, in 3 Nephi 12:48, Jesus invites the people to be perfect, "even as I, or your Father who is in heaven is perfect," expanding the call to divine perfection to include Himself, thus highlighting His divinity in the post-resurrection context of the Americas.

The Baháʼí Lawḥ-i-Aqdas tablet concludes with 21 beatitudes, including this statement:

Blessed the soul that hath been raised to life through My quickening breath and hath gained admittance into My heavenly Kingdom.

The Qur'an mirrors the Bible only in Q:21:105 which resembles Psalm 25:13 referred to in Matthew 5:5; but the Qur'an uses "righteous" rather than "meek". The Qur'an (e.g., "say the word of humility and enter the gate of paradise") and some Hadith (e.g., "My mercy exceeds my anger") contain some passages with somewhat similar tone, but distinct phraseology, from the Beatitudes.

The Bhagavad Gita and the traditional writings of Buddhism (e.g., some of the Mangala Sutta) have been interpreted as including teachings whose intentions resemble some of the messages of Beatitudes (e.g., humility and absence of ego), although their wording is not the same.

Six "modern Beatitudes" were proposed by Pope Francis during his visit to Malmö, Sweden on All Saints Day 2016:

1. Blessed are those who remain faithful while enduring evils inflicted on them by others and forgive them from their heart.
2. Blessed are those who look into the eyes of the abandoned and marginalized and show them their closeness.
3. Blessed are those who see God in every person and strive to make others also discover Him.
4. Blessed are those who protect and care for our common home.
5. Blessed are those who renounce their own comfort in order to help others.
6. Blessed are those who pray and work for full communion between Christians.

== In popular culture ==
- In 2014 the Irish composer Patrick Cassidy included the Beatitudes as part of the soundtrack for the movie Calvary.

== Bibliography ==
- Baxter, Roger (1823). "The Sermon on the Mount (The Beatitudes)" . Meditations For Every Day In The Year. New York: Benziger Brothers. pp. 368–381.
- Bossuet, Jacques-Bénigne (1900). "The Beatitudes (Day 1 - 9)". The Sermon on the Mount . Longmans, Green, and Co.
- Easwaran, Eknath. Original Goodness (on Beatitudes). Nilgiri Press, 1989. ISBN 0-915132-91-5.
- Kissinger, Warren S. The Sermon on the Mount: A History of Interpretation and Bibliography. Metuchen: Scarecrow Press, 1975.
- Kühl, Ingo Seligpreisungen der Bergpredigt – kolorierte Lithografien (Beatitudes of the Sermon of the Mount – coloured Lithographs), Berlin 1997.
- Twomey, M.W. "The Beatitudes". A Dictionary of Biblical Tradition in English Literature. Jeffrey, David Lyle ed. Grand Rapids: W.B. Eerdmans, 1992.

== See also ==
- Social Justice
- Community of the Beatitudes
- Divine Mercy
- Life of Jesus in the New Testament
- Mount of Beatitudes

== Notes ==
Beatitudes Life of Jesus: Sermon on the Mount or on the Plain
Preceded by First disciples of Jesus	Gospel harmony Events	Succeeded by The Antitheses in the Sermon on the Mount
