= The Frontier Gandhi =

The Frontier Gandhi: Badshah Khan, a Torch for Peace
- Written by: Teri C. McLuhan
- Starring: Om Puri
- Release date: 2008
- Running time: 88 minutes
- Languages: Pashtu, Dari, Urdu, Hindi, English

The Frontier Gandhi: Badshah Khan, a Torch for Peace, a documentary released in 2008, is the first full film account of Pashtun leader and nonviolent activist Abdul Ghaffar Khan, also known as Badshah Khan or Bacha Khan.

The documentary is the work of filmmaker and writer T.C. McLuhan, daughter of the Canadian media theorist Marshall McLuhan, who spent 21 years to bring the story to the screen after an acquaintance gave her Nonviolent Soldier of Islam.

The voice of Ghaffar Khan is played by Indian actor Om Puri and includes interviews with elderly activists of the Khudai Khidmatgar movement as well as major political figures in Afghanistan, Pakistan and India.

The film had its Middle-Eastern premier at the 3rd Middle East International Film Festival in Abu Dhabi in October, 2009, where it won the top award for documentary films. The BBC quoted Afrasiab Khattak, head of the Awami National Party in North-West Frontier Province, as saying that "This film will help a lot in introducing Badshah Khan to the rest of the world."

McLuhan has stated that she believes the film counters stereotypes. McLuhan reported encountering resistance both in making the film and in marketing it, and stated that one reason was

we’re dealing with very powerful stereotypes, and there is a stereotype that exists for Islam that... portrays Islam as unredeeming and violent. The story of this man’s courage, and his moral and spiritual attitude and the profound absence of doubt in his life turns that stereotype by 180 degrees [and] that makes people uncomfortable.

The Times of India reported that a private screening of the film had been requested by the president of India for 17 September 2013.

== See also ==
- Khudai Khidmatgar
- Abdul Wali Khan
