= Eknath Easwaran =

Indian-American spiritual teacher

- Born: December 17, 1910; Kerala, India
- Died: October 26, 1999 (aged 88); California, USA
- Known for: Spiritual teacher, author, translator and interpreter of spiritual literature, teacher of Passage Meditation

Eknath Easwaran (December 17, 1910 – October 26, 1999) was an Indian-born spiritual teacher, author, and translator and interpreter of Indian religious texts such as the Bhagavad Gita and the Upanishads.

Easwaran was a professor of English literature at the University of Nagpur in India when he came to the United States in 1959 on the Fulbright Program at the University of Minnesota before moving to Berkeley and registering as a visiting scholar at the University of California, Berkeley. In 1961, Easwaran founded the Blue Mountain Center of Meditation, based in northern California. In 1968 Easwaran established Nilgiri Press. Nilgiri Press has published over thirty books that he authored.

Easwaran was influenced by Mahatma Gandhi, whom he met when he was a young man. Easwaran developed a method of meditation – silent repetition in the mind of memorized inspirational passages from the world's major religious and spiritual traditions – which later came to be known as Passage Meditation.

His teachings inspired some of his students to create the 1976 vegetarian cookbook Laurel's Kitchen.

== Biography ==
Eknath Easwaran was born in 1910 in a village in Kerala, India. Eknath is his surname, Easwaran his given name. Brought up by his mother, and by his maternal grandmother whom he honored as his spiritual teacher, he was schooled in his native village until the age of sixteen, when he went to attend St. Thomas College, Thrissur, a Catholic college fifty miles away. He graduated at the University of Nagpur in English and law. He served as Chair of the Department of English at University of Nagpur. Prior to arriving in the United States, he had a family with two children.

In 1959, he came to the United States as a Fulbright scholar.

Eknath Easwaran teaching what is thought to be the first credit course on meditation offered at a major university in the U.S. at U.C. Berkeley in 1968

From 1960–1961 Easwaran gave talks on the Indian scriptures in the San Francisco Bay Area. He met his American wife Christine at one of these talks. Easwaran founded the Blue Mountain Center of Meditation in 1961. He went back to India in 1962 to fulfill the terms of the Fulbright, returning to the Bay Area in 1965 to continue his teaching. In 1968 he was invited by a professor at the University of California, Berkeley, to teach on a Religious Studies course entitled The Theory and Practice of Meditation – the first in the country offering credits.

In 1970 he founded Ramagiri Ashram as a community of dedicated followers in Marin County.

He set up a publishing activity, Nilgiri Press, which printed his first book Gandhi The Man, telling the story of Gandhi as a spiritual as well as a political leader. His first major work was his 3-volume commentary on the Bhagavad Gita, the Bhagavad Gita for Daily Living, the first volume of which was printed in 1975 and the last in 1984. His book Meditation on the program of meditation and allied disciplines that he developed first appeared in 1978.

By 2018, Easwaran's methods of spiritual practice had been the focus of two major scientific research programs that had produced thirty refereed research reports.

== Published works ==
Easwaran's written works may be grouped into several major categories—primarily books, but also articles in newspapers and other periodicals. Most of his books have been reviewed by spiritually oriented publications or websites, or by nationally known media such as The New Yorker, or the New York Post.

In addition, a large number of Easwaran's recorded talks have been published in video and audio formats.

=== Translations ===
Easwaran's translations of the Bhagavad Gita, the Upanishads, and the Dhammapada (see article) have been critically acclaimed. Religion scholar Huston Smith is cited by the publisher as writing: "No one in modern times is more qualified – no, make that 'as qualified' – to translate the epochal Classics of Indian Spirituality than Eknath Easwaran. And the reason is clear. It is impossible to get to the heart of those classics unless you live them, and he did live them. My admiration of the man and his works is boundless." In Buddhism: A Concise Introduction Smith and his coauthor Philip Novak wrote that "Our favorite translation is Eknath Easwaran's The Dhammapada. His Indian heritage, literary gifts, and spiritual sensibilities... here produce a sublime rendering of the words of the Buddha. Verse after verse shimmers with quiet, confident authority. A bonus is the sparkling 70-page introduction to the Buddha's life and teachings."

Since 2009, Easwaran's three translations "have each been the best-selling translations of these scriptures in the USA." In the US in 2016, each of Easwaran's translations outsold the second best-selling translation in its category "by more than 3:1", and the second editions have together sold more than 470,000 copies.

=== Commentaries ===
Essence of the Upanishads, originally entitled Dialogue with death: The spiritual psychology of the Katha Upanishad, explains how the Katha Upanishad embraces the key ideas of Indian spirituality within the context of a powerful mythic quest – the story of a young hero who ventures into the land of death in search of immortality. "Essence of the Upanishads is a westerner's guide to this vitally important Indian text and its modern relevance to the Indian mindset and spirituality."

In Essence of the Bhagavad Gita, Easwaran places the Gita's teachings in a modern context and comments on the Gita's view of the nature of reality, the illusion of separateness, the search for identity, the meaning of yoga, and how to heal the unconscious. The book views the key message of the Gita as how to resolve our conflicts and live in harmony with the deep unity of life, through the practice of meditation and spiritual disciplines.

In Essence of the Dhammapada, Easwaran comments on the Dhammapada, sayings attributed to the Buddha himself, presenting it as a guide that gives straightforward teachings about spiritual perseverance, progress, and enlightenment.

=== Books on meditation ===
His book Passage Meditation (original title Meditation) describes the Eight Point Program that Easwaran developed, while his book Conquest of Mind goes further into the practice of these disciplines in daily life. Timeless Wisdom is a companion book to Passage Meditation and contains passages for meditation drawn from across the world's spiritual traditions. His book Mantram Handbook: a practical guide to choosing your mantram and calming your mind addresses The Mantram, the second point in the program.

His book Strength in the Storm is an introduction to The Mantram, containing many stories and practical examples to help the reader learn how to harness the inner resources for dealing with challenges in daily living. His book Take Your Time explores "Slowing Down" and "One-Pointed Attention" in daily lives. Renewal is a pocket book of short readings on themes such as loving relationships, raising children, living simply, and aging wisely; Patience, the second in the pocket book series, shows how to cultivate Patience – "the ornament of the brave" – at any age. Other (older) books describe various aspects of leading a spiritual life: Climbing the Blue Mountain, Compassionate Universe, and Undiscovered Country.

=== Daily readers and reference ===
God Makes the Rivers to Flow is an anthology of writings from the sacred literature of the world, selected by Easwaran as useful for meditation. A larger (and earlier) version of Timeless Wisdom, it contains dozens of passages from diverse traditions, and identifies passages for particular stages in life, such as caregiving, families with small children, death and dying, grief and loss, and for building positive qualities such as patience, courage, devotion to God, and putting others first. Words to Live By is a set of daily readings with Easwaran's commentary on applying the reading to daily life.

=== The Bhagavad Gita for Daily Living ===
The Bhagavad Gita for Daily Living is a manual for living a spiritual life, comprising a verse-by-verse commentary on India's timeless scripture the Bhagavad Gita. The work is in three volumes, published in 1975, 1979 and 1984 respectively, in hardcover and later also in paperback. When the first paperbacks were published the volumes were given new subtitles: the End of Sorrow; Like a Thousand Suns; and To Love is To Know Me.

In 2020 the three-volume set was reissued as a second edition, and as a single-volume ebook.

In Volume 1 (the first six chapters of the Gita) Easwaran explains how readers can begin to transform themselves, even as householders engaged in busy lives. In Volume 2 (the next six chapters) Easwaran addresses the seeming divide between scientific knowledge and spiritual wisdom, and explains how the concept of the unity of life can help people in all their relationships. In Volume 3 (the final six chapters) he makes the connection between the Self within and the Reality underlying all creation – and how to make a difference to heal the environment and establish peace in the world.

=== Spiritual biographies ===
Gandhi the Man traces how Mohandas Gandhi transformed himself into one of the world's great spiritual leaders.

Nonviolent Soldier of Islam is the life story of Khan Abdul Ghaffar Khan, a Pathan (or Pushtun) of Afghanistan and a devout Muslim, who raised the first nonviolent army in history to gain Indian independence from British colonial rule. This book was favorably discussed in The New Yorker. The book also inspired filmmaker and writer T.C. McLuhan, daughter of Canadian media theorist Marshall McLuhan, to make the film The Frontier Gandhi: Badshah Khan, a Torch for Peace, which won the 2009 Black Pearl Award for Best Documentary Film.

=== Commentaries on Christian literature ===
Original Goodness is a commentary on the Beatitudes. Love Never Faileth is a commentary on the writings of St Francis, St Paul, St Augustine, and Mother Teresa. Seeing with the Eyes of Love is a commentary on The Imitation of Christ.

=== Newspapers and other periodicals ===
In the 1980s and 1990s, Easwaran published a variety of commentaries on public events in prominent periodicals, especially The Christian Science Monitor, and also in The New York Times, elsewhere in the US, and internationally. He also wrote numerous commentaries that appeared in the Little Lamp (1961–1995), and in Blue Mountain (1990–present), quarterly journals published by the meditation center that he founded. In the 1960s, Easwaran published articles in other spiritual journals, such as the Mountain Path, published by Sri Ramana Maharshi's ashram. Before coming to the US in 1959, Easwaran contributed short stories and other writings to literary anthologies, and to magazines such as The Illustrated Weekly of India.

=== Video and audio ===
Many of Easwaran's recorded talks have been published in video and audio formats.

Several dozen of Easwaran's talks have been published as video DVDs, and now as downloadable MP4s as a free subscription from the Blue Mountain Center. Before publication as DVDs, videos of Easwaran's talks were first released in VHS videotape format. Some talks are published in downloadable audio/MP3 formats. Instructions for meditation by Easwaran have been published in audio form as CDs. Some of Easwaran's talks were earlier published as cassette tapes or LP records. Magazines have reviewed some of Easwaran's published talks, both audio and video, since the 1990s.

Several of Easwaran's written works, including Essence of the Upanishads, Passage Meditation, The Bhagavad Gita, The Dhammapada and Gandhi the Man, have been published as audio books, as voice-recorded by the British actor Paul Bazely, and also the philosopher Jacob Needleman.

== Eight-point program ==
Easwaran's program for spiritual growth consists of eight points, and is described comprehensively in his book Passage Meditation – A Complete Spiritual Practice (originally published in 1978 as Meditation). Each point has a dedicated chapter:

1. Meditation on a Passage: Silent repetition upon memorized inspirational passages from one of the world's great religions. Practiced for one-half hour each morning.
2. The Mantram: silent repetition of a mantram, holy name or hallowed phrase from one of the world's great religions.
3. Slowing Down: set priorities to reduce stress and hurry.
4. One-Pointed Attention: give full concentration to whatever matter is currently at hand.
5. Training the Senses: enjoy simple pleasures in order to avoid craving for unhealthy excess.
6. Putting Others First: denounce selfishness and cultivating altruism.
7. Spiritual Companionship: practice meditation in the company of others.
8. Reading the Mystics: draw inspiration from the writings of the scriptures of all religions.

== Vegetarianism ==
Easwaran was a lifelong vegetarian.

Students of Easwaran, including Carol Lee Flinders, inspired in part by his teachings about compassion and stewardship for the environment, published the highly influential vegetarian cookbook, Laurel's Kitchen (1976), which had a strong impact on the natural foods movement within the American counterculture. A second edition, The New Laurel's Kitchen, was published in 1986.

The book has sold over a million copies. Laurel's Kitchen contained extensive nutritional information from a scientific point of view.

== Other influence ==
A variety of influences of Easwaran's life and work have been documented.

Easwaran's teachings or practices have sometimes been taught as part of traditional college courses, or as tools for self-management by health professionals.

Outside of the US, Easwaran's life and teachings were profiled, along with those of a variety of other spiritual teachers, in a book published in India entitled Meditation Masters and their Insights.

Easwaran's words have been included in collections of wisdom teachings, such as ones recently published by Chang (2006) and Parachin (2011). Quotations from Easwaran's translations have been used many times by both scholarly and popular writers. Easwaran's other writings have also been quoted by various types of authors, including writers of novels and short stories, popular spirituality, and articles on management theory. Psychiatrist Aaron Beck and his colleagues quoted from Easwaran's commentary on the Katha Upanishad. The NAPRA ReView wrote that "The volume of [Easwaran's] work and the quality of his discourse suggest a man who has had a profound impact on the spiritual lives of many."

Easwaran's method of passage meditation was followed by the poet Robert Lax. Near the end of his life, Lax's only reading each day was from Easwaran's book Words to Live By.

New Hampshire State Representative Latha Mangipudi reported having given then-Senator Barack Obama a copy of Easwaran's book Gandhi the Man in December 2006.

Easwaran has been listed in reference works on spiritual and religious leaders.

In his survey of commentaries on the Bhagavad Gita, Nadkarni described Easwaran as "respected worldwide as one of the most profound writers and orators on religion and spirituality".

== Controversy ==
In 1983, after years of close association with Easwaran’s work, a number of students decided to move on. Some gave their reasons in a story by John Hubner published in the San Jose Mercury News Sunday supplement in 1989. Two women said that Easwaran had "repeatedly tried to fondle them". Several people expressed anger because they felt Easwaran was not the man they had thought he was.

== Bibliography ==
Easwaran's books, initially written in English, have also been translated into more than 20 other languages, and published in non-US editions by indigenous (non-US) publishers. Languages in which his books are currently in print include Bahasa Indonesian, Bulgarian, Czech, Dutch, English, French, German, Greek, Hungarian, Italian, Japanese, Korean, Lithuanian, Portuguese, Romanian, Slovenian, Spanish, and Telugu. His books have also been translated into Chinese (PRC).

- The Bhagavad Gita (Translation and Introduction), 2007 (ISBN 978-158638-019-9), e-book: (ISBN 9781586380236)
- The Dhammapada (Translation and Introduction), 2007 (ISBN 978-1-58638-020-5), e-book: (ISBN 9781586380243)
- Upanishads (Translation and Introduction), 2007 (ISBN 978-1-58638-021-2), e-book: (ISBN 9781586380250)
- Passage meditation – A complete spiritual practice: Train your mind and find a life that fulfills (see article), 2016 (ISBN 978-1-58638-116-5), e-book: (ISBN 9781586381172), a comprehensively revised edition of
  - Passage Meditation: Bringing the Deep Wisdom of the Heart into Daily Life, 2008 (ISBN 978-1-58638-026-7), a republication of
  - Meditation: Commonsense Directions for an Uncommon Life, 1978 (ISBN 0-915132-66-4) (also a 2nd edition, 1991)
- Conquest of Mind: Take charge of your thoughts & reshape your life through meditation, 3rd ed. 2010 (ISBN 9781586380472), e-book: (ISBN 9781586380489)
- The Bhagavad Gita for Daily Living (Translation and Verse by Verse Commentary):
  - First Edition (1975–1984):
  - The End of Sorrow (The Bhagavad Gita for Daily Living, Vol. 1), 1975, 1993 (ISBN 9780915132171), e-book: (ISBN 9781586380519)
  - Like a Thousand Suns (The Bhagavad Gita for Daily Living, Vol. 2), 1979, 1993 (ISBN 9780915132188), e-book: (ISBN 9781586380526)
  - To Love Is to Know Me (Bhagavad Gita for Daily Living, Vol. 3), 1984, 1993 (ISBN 9780915132195), e-book: (ISBN 9781586380533)
  - Second Edition (2020):
  - The Bhagavad Gita for Daily Living Volume One (Chapters 1–6: The End of Sorrow), 2020 (paperback ISBN 9781586381325, hardcover ISBN 9781586381332)
  - The Bhagavad Gita for Daily Living Volume Two (Chapters 7–12: Like a Thousand Suns), 2020 (paperback ISBN 9781586381349, hardcover ISBN 9781586381356)
  - The Bhagavad Gita for Daily Living Volume Three (Chapters 13–18: To Love Is to Know Me), 2020 (paperback ISBN 9781586381363, hardcover ISBN 9781586381370)
  - The Bhagavad Gita for Daily Living Volumes 1–3, 2020 e-book (ISBN 9781586381455)
- Essence of the Bhagavad Gita: A Contemporary Guide to Yoga, Meditation and Indian Philosophy, 2011 (ISBN 978-1-58638-068-7), e-book: (ISBN 9781586380694)
- Essence of the Dhammapada: The Buddha's Call to Nirvana, 2013 (ISBN 978-1-58638-097-7)
- Essence of the Upanishads: A Key to Indian Spirituality (see article), 2009 (ISBN 978-1-58638-036-6), e-book: (ISBN 9781586380373), originally published as:
  - Dialogue With Death: A Journey Through Consciousness, 1992
- God Makes the Rivers to Flow: An anthology of the world's sacred poetry & prose (see article), 2009 (ISBN 9781586380380), e-book: (ISBN 9781586380397), a larger version of:
  - Timeless Wisdom: Passages for meditation from the world's saints & sages (see article), 2008 (ISBN 978-1-58638-027-4), e-book: (ISBN 9781586380311)
- Climbing the Blue Mountain: A Guide for the Spiritual Journey, 1992, 2014 (ISBN 978-1586381158), e-book: (ISBN 9781586380588), previously published as:
  - Supreme Ambition: Life's Goals and How to Reach It
- Love Never Faileth: Commentaries on texts from St. Francis, St. Paul, St. Augustine & Mother Teresa, with introductions by Carol L. Flinders, 1993 (ISBN 9780915132898), e-book: (ISBN 9781586380618)
- Seeing With the Eyes of Love: A Commentary on a text from the Imitation of Christ, 1993 (ISBN 9780915132874), e-book: (ISBN 9781586380649)
- Original Goodness: A Commentary on the Beatitudes, 1996 (ISBN 9780915132911), e-book: (ISBN 9781586380632)
- The Undiscovered Country: Exploring the Promise of Death, 1996 (ISBN 9780915132836), e-book: (ISBN 9781586380656)
- Words to Live By: Inspiration for Every Day, 1996 (ISBN 9781586380168), reissued as Words to Live By: Short Readings of Daily Wisdom, 2010 (ISBN 9781586380496), e-book: (ISBN 9781586380502)
- Gandhi the Man: How One Man Changed Himself to Change the World (see article), 2011 (ISBN 978-1586380557), e-book: (ISBN 9781586380427)
- Nonviolent Soldier of Islam: Badshah Khan, A Man to Match His Mountains (see article) (ISBN 9781888314007), e-book: (ISBN 9781586380625), previously published as
  - A man to match his mountains: Badshah Khan, nonviolent soldier of Islam (1984)
- A Higher Image, 2002
- Love Alters Not, 2002
- The Compassionate Universe, 1989, 1993 (ISBN 978-1586381141), e-book: (ISBN 9781586380595)
- Patience: A Little Book of Inner Strength, 2010 (ISBN 9781586380458), e-book: (ISBN 9781586380465)
- Renewal: A Little Book of Courage and Hope, 2009 (ISBN 9781586380342), e-book: (ISBN 9781586380359), a re-edited and republished version of:
  - Your Life Is Your Message: Finding Harmony With Yourself, Others, and the Earth
- Strength in the Storm: Transform Stress, Live in Balance and Find Peace of Mind, 2005, 2013 (ISBN 978-1586381011), e-book: (ISBN 9781586381028)
- Take Your Time: The Wisdom of Slowing Down (ISBN 9781586380182), e-book: (ISBN 9781586380441)
- The Constant Companion (ISBN 9781586380038), e-book: (ISBN 9781586380601), previously published as:
  - Thousand Names of Vishnu
- The Mantram Handbook (see article) (ISBN 9781586380281), e-book: (ISBN 9781586380328), previously issued as:
  - The Unstruck Bell: Powerful New Strategies for Using a Mantram
- A More Ardent Fire: From Everyday Love to Love of God (ISBN 9781888314021), e-book: (ISBN 9781586380571)
- Kabir: Stages of Desire
- Saint Francis: Becoming an Instrument of Peace
- With My Love and Blessings: The Teaching Years, 1966–1999, in Photographs & His Own Words
- The Monkey and the Mango: Stories of My Granny (Illustrated by Ilka Jerabek), 1996 (ISBN 9780915132829)

From 2011, a number of Easwaran's books and articles were excerpted and republished as the series of short ebooks "Easwaran Inspirations":

- How to Meditate, the instructions in meditation from Passage Meditation (ISBN 9781586380717, ASIN B0056I0G82)
- How to Understand Death, excerpted from "The Undiscovered Country" (ISBN 9781586380755, ASIN B006L28LKM)
- How to Find Happiness, based on two articles from Easwaran's Blue Mountain Journal(ISBN 9781586380762, ASIN B006PBPEB8)
- Learning to Love Part 1 (ISBN 9781586380748, ASIN B0073WNEZG) and Learning to Love Part 2 (ISBN 9781586380779, ASIN B0CS586145), excerpted from a number of books
- What is Karma, the chapter on Karma from Essence of the Dhammapada: The Buddha's Call to Nirvana (ISBN 9781586380731, ASIN B00CLTSFNM)

Contributions to works by others include:

- Eknath Easwaran (1969). "To all mankind". Ramana Pictorial Souvenir Commemorating the Kumbhabhishekam on June 18, 1967. Tiruvannamalai, India: Board of Trustees Sri Ramanasramam: 7. (contribution to edited volume)
- Eknath Easwaran (1991). "Working for others [reprinted from the Little Lamp, vol. 22, no. 3, Autumn 1982]" (pp 72–84) in Lilia Lender (1991). The Choice is Yours: Ethics in Vedanta [introduction by Swami Chinmayananda]. Mumbai, India: Central Chinmaya Mission Trust. pp. 72–84. ISBN 978-81-7597-122-6.
- Eknath Easwaran (1996). Preface (pp. ix–x) to Devi Vanamali (1996). The play of God: Visions of the life of Krishna. San Diego, CA: Blue Dove Press. ISBN 978-1-884997-07-5
- Eknath Easwaran (1997). Roger S. Powers; William B. Vogele; Christopher Kruegler; Ronald M. McCarthy (eds.). Khan Abdul Ghaffar Khan (1890–1988). New York: Garland. pp. 284–286. ISBN 9780815309130.
- Preface to The Essential Gandhi by Louis Fischer (2002, 2nd edition). New York: Vintage. (ISBN 1400030501)
- Preface to In Quest of God: The Saga of an Extraordinary Pilgrimage by Swami Ramdas (2002, 2nd American edition). San Diego, CA: Blue Dove Foundation. (ISBN 1884997015)

== See also ==
- Perennial philosophy
