= Bulletin of Science, Technology & Society =

- Discipline: Science education
- Language: English
- Edited by: Jeffry Will

Publication details
- History: 1981–present
- Publisher: SAGE Publications
- Frequency: Bimonthly
- Impact factor: (2010)

Standard abbreviations
- ISO 4: Bull. Sci. Technol. Soc.

Indexing
- ISSN: 0270-4676
- LCCN: 81642998
- OCLC no.: 645306721

Links
- Journal homepage; Online access; Online archive

Bulletin of Science, Technology & Society is a bimonthly peer-reviewed academic journal that publishes papers in the field of science policy, science and technology studies, and science education. The editor-in-chief is Jeffry Will (University of North Florida). It was established in 1981 and is currently published by SAGE Publications.

== Abstracting and indexing ==
Bulletin of Science, Technology & Society is abstracted and indexed in:

- Academic Elite
- Academic Premier
- ERIC
- Horticultural Science Abstracts
- Scopus
