= Passage Meditation =

1978 book by Eknath Easwaran

- First edition
- Author: Eknath Easwaran
- Language: English (orig.) & trans.: Bulgarian, Chinese, Czech, Dutch, French, German, Hungarian, Korean, Lithuanian, Portuguese, Romanian, Russian, Slovenian, Spanish, Telugu
- Publisher: Nilgiri Press; others
- Publication date: 1978 (original); 2016; others
- Pages: 237 (1978); 270 (2016)
- ISBN: 978-1-58638-116-5
- OCLC: 950007677.

Passage Meditation is a book by Eknath Easwaran, originally published in 1978 with the title Meditation. The book describes a meditation program, also now commonly referred to as Passage Meditation. Easwaran developed this method of meditation in the 1960s, and first taught it systematically at the University of California, Berkeley.

The program is an eight-point program intended for the "spiritual growth" of the practitioner. The first step in the program involves meditating on a text passage, and since the 1990s the method as a whole has come to be known as "Passage Meditation" (not Easwaran's term). The book has been frequently reprinted and translated into 14 languages. It is reported that more than 200,000 copies were sold in the period of 1978 to 2001.

The first edition of the book had the full title Meditation; commonsense directions for an uncommon life (1978). A second edition in 1991 was subtitled a simple eight-point program for translating spiritual ideals into daily life, and a third, revised edition of the book was published posthumously as Passage Meditation; Bringing the Deep Wisdom of the Heart Into Daily Life (2008).

A fourth, revised edition was published as Passage Meditation – A Complete Spiritual Practice: Train Your Mind and Find a Life that Fulfills (2016). The fourth edition included a new part, not contained in earlier editions, with approximately 80 pages of "Questions and Answers" to numerous questions about meditation (pp. 182–264).

== Topics covered ==
All editions of Passage Meditation contain a chapter dedicated to each of the eight practices or "points" of Easwaran's method of meditation. Each edition also contains a preface by the author in which he explains how he discovered the passage meditation method.

=== Method ===
Meditating on a passage is the first point in Easwaran's eight point program of Passage Meditation, and he recommends practicing it for 30 minutes each day on first rising. The other seven points are to be woven in at various times throughout the day or week. Each of the book's eight main chapters are dedicated to explaining one of the eight points:

1. Meditation on a passage
2. Repetition of a mantram (mantra, or prayer word)
3. Slowing down
4. One-pointed attention
5. Training the senses
6. Putting others first
7. Spiritual fellowship
8. Spiritual reading

Meditation on a passage involves silent, focused repetition during meditation of memorized selections from scriptures of the world and writings of great mystics. According to Easwaran, the practice of meditating on a specific passage of text (Easwaran suggests the Prayer of Saint Francis or Psalm 23 as examples) has the effect of eventually transforming "character, conduct, and consciousness." The term passage is chosen to describe a spiritually-inspired text that one meditates on, during an extended period of time set aside for meditation, as compared to a mantram (or mantra). Easwaran collected an anthology of selections from the world's spiritual texts, God Makes the Rivers to Flow, for use in meditation.

Repetition of a mantram. Easwaran describes a mantram as a short, powerful spiritual formula which can be repeated, at any time during the day or night, to call up the best and deepest in ourselves, and help to slow down, to become more one-pointed, and to put others first.

Slowing Down is a spiritual discipline. Living faster and faster may offer less time for inner reflection or sensitivity to others, making our lives tense and insecure. Slowing down may help achieve freedom of action, good relations with others, health and vitality, calmness of mind, and the ability to grow, it is claimed.

One-pointed attention helps to unify consciousness and deepen concentration. Training the mind to give full attention to one thing at a time, whether it is in science or the arts or sports or a profession, is a basic requirement for achieving a goal.

Training the senses means freeing the mind from the tyranny of likes and dislikes so as to "live in freedom", "live intentionally"

Putting others first. Dwelling on ourselves builds a wall between ourselves and others. Those who keep thinking about their needs, their wants, their plans, their ideas, cannot help becoming lonely and insecure. As human beings, it is our nature to be part of a whole, to live in a context where personal relationships are supportive and close.

Spiritual Fellowship with people whose companionship is elevating, and working together for a selfless goal without expecting any reward or recognition, augment and enhance the individual's capacities.

Easwaran says that the eight points, though they may at first seem unrelated, are closely linked. "Quieting your mind in morning meditation, for instance, will help your efforts to slow down at work, and slowing down at work will, in turn, improve your meditation ... Unless you practice all of them, you cannot progress safely and far".

Passage Meditation does not require adherence to any particular religion or belief.

=== Questions and Answers ===
The fourth edition (published in 2016) also contains about 80 pages dedicated to answering numerous questions about how to practice the program.

== Influence, research, use ==
Workers in professional fields, as well as writers of popular books, have cited or been influenced by the passage meditation program. Sometimes, the passage meditation program has been included among resources for complementary and alternative medicine.

Several empirical research studies have examined the effects on health professionals and college undergraduates from receiving training in the Passage Meditation (PM) program. Peer-reviewed research, published in professional psychology and health journals, has shown that following the passage meditation program reduces stress and increases confidence in tasks such as caregiving.

These studies mostly used randomized methods. Like much recent research on meditation (e.g., on mindfulness meditation), research studies on Passage Meditation have neither postulated nor claimed to infer the operation of supernatural or other non-natural, non-psychological processes. Research on Passage Meditation through early 2007 was reviewed in chapter 6 of Spirit, science and health: How the spiritual mind fuels physical wellness.

In Neurology Now, published by the American Academy of Neurology, the article "Meditation as Medicine" states that various well-designed studies show that meditation can increase attention span, sharpen focus, improve memory, and dull the perception of pain, and lists Passage Meditation as a common meditation method.

Passage Meditation has sometimes been integrated into college curricula.

== Editions ==
In 2001, Publishers Weekly reported that the book Meditation (later republished in as Passage Meditation) had "sold more than 200,000 copies since its 1978 debut." English editions have been published in the US, the UK, and India. Non-English translations of the book have been published in Bulgarian, Chinese, Czech, Dutch, French, German, Hungarian, Korean, Lithuanian, Portuguese, Romanian, Russian, Slovenian, Spanish, and Telugu, The four US editions are:

- Eknath Easwaran, Meditation: commonsense directions for an uncommon life, Nilgiri Press (1978), ISBN 978-0-915132-15-7, OCLC 1036697581 (237 pages).
  - reprinted in 1980, 1984, 1989 by Nilgiri Press, ISBN 978-0-915132-16-4.
- Eknath Easwaran, Meditation: a simple eight-point program for translating spiritual ideals into daily life, Nilgiri Press (2nd ed. 1991), ISBN 978-0-915132-66-9, OCLC 630779370 (251 pages).
- Eknath Easwaran, Passage Meditation: Bringing the deep wisdom of the heart into daily life, Nilgiri Press (3rd revised ed. 2008), ISBN 978-1-58638-026-7, OCLC 846570022 (233 pages).
- Easwaran, Eknath (2016). Passage meditation – A complete spiritual practice: Train your mind and find a life that fulfills (4th ed.). Tomales, CA: Nilgiri Press. ISBN 978-1-58638-116-5. OCLC 950007677. (270 pages). e-book ISBN 978-1-58638-117-2, Audiobook ASIN B01KOZA8X4

English-language editions have been published in the United Kingdom by Taylor & Francis (1979, ISBN 978-0-7100-0344-7, OCLC 16498976, 237 pages) and in India by Penguin (1996, ISBN 978-0-14-019036-6, OCLC 43485379, 237 pages), and Jaico (2008, ISBN 978-81-7992-813-4, OCLC 294882652, 251 pages).

== See also ==
- Research on meditation
