= Jaico Publishing House =

Indian publisher

Jaico
- Status: Active
- Founded: 1946
- Founder: Jaman Shah
- Successor: Ashwin J. Shah
- Country of origin: India
- Headquarters location: Mumbai, India
- Official website: www.jaicobooks.com

Jaico Publishing House is a prominent publisher in India.

== History ==
Jaico was founded in 1946 by Jaman Shah as a book distribution business for U.S. paperback publishers. The company's name commemorates India's independence ("Jai" means victory in Hindi language). Jaico was India's first and only publisher of paperback books in the English language.

During the 1960s, Jaico was one of the first houses in India to publish English translations of non-English writings by Indian authors. In 1999, SC Sethi head of Jaico in Delhi, became the president of the Federation of Publishers' & Booksellers Association in India.

== Branches ==
Jaico has offices in cities of Mumbai (head office), Ahmedabad, Bangalore, Bhopal, Bhubaneshwar, Chennai, Delhi, Hyderabad, Kolkata, and Lucknow. These offices have a combined sales force of 40 executives. Jaico also operates a direct mail order division.

== Titles ==
Jaico publishes over 1500 titles on subjects that include Indian and international literature, history, politics, sociology, religion, philosophy, law, health and self-improvement. Jaico sells many titles in business management and its subfields, such as general management, marketing, finance and e-commerce to cater to the needs of India's rapidly developing corporate sector. Jaico also sells textbooks in information technology, computer science and engineering. Jaico is also an Indian distributor for national and international publishers that include McGraw Hill, Pearson, Addison Wesley, International Thomson and Butterworth Heinemann.

== See also ==
- List of English language book publishers
- Publishing
