= Rory (band) =

American pop punk band

- Origin: Altamonte Springs, Florida, United States
- Genres: Pop punk Indie rock
- Years active: 1998–2007
- Label: One Eleven Records
- Members: Jeremy Menard; Joel Setzer; Marc Ispass; Jordan Shroyer; Allen Peoples

Rory is an American pop punk band from Altamonte Springs, Florida. They are signed to One Eleven Records.

== History ==
Since Rory's inception in 1998, they have released an EP and a full length. They signed to One Eleven Records in early 2004. Their most recent release, We're Up to No Good, We're Up to No Good was produced by John Avila of Oingo Boingo fame, and Mark Hoppus of Blink-182/+44 fame. It was released September 12, 2006.

The band toured nationally and has shared the stage with the likes of Fall Out Boy, Less Than Jake, The Spill Canvas, Self Against City, This Day & Age, Rookie of the Year, and more.

== Discography ==
=== Studio albums ===
- We're Up to No Good, We're Up to No Good (2006), One Eleven Records

=== EPs ===
- Always Right As In We Are (2004), One Eleven Records

=== Compilation appearances ===
- Drive-Thru Records And Purevolume.com Compilation (2005) ("Deja Vroom)" - on disc one. Drive-Thru Records
- Punk The Clock Vol. 2 (2005) ("Deja Vroom)" DCide Records

== Videography ==
- "This Could've Been A Dance Dance Revolution, But Now It's Just A Dance" (2004)
- "Deja Vroomier" (2006)
- "Kind Of Like Chloroformity" (2006)
- "Tonight I Don't Care, I'm Having Candy For Dinner" (2006)
- "Nice Planet, We'll Take It" (2006)
