= Since I Left Your World =

EP by Rookie of the Year
- Released: November 17, 2009
- Recorded: Atlanta
- Genre: Indie rock, pop rock, acoustic
- Length: 19:31
- Label: One Eleven
- Producer: Matt Malpass

Rookie of the Year chronology
Sweet Attention (2008)	Since I Left Your World (2009)	The Most Beautiful (2010)

Since I Left Your World is the fourth release and first EP by the American indie rock band Rookie of the Year, released through 111 Records on November 17, 2009. The EP is a follow-up to 2008's Sweet Attention and contains elements from the album as well as previous albums The Goodnight Moon (2006), and Having To Let Go (2005). The songwriting team of Ryan Dunson and Mike Kamerman fuse acoustic and folk rock with a modern American indie rock sound.

== Track listing ==
1. "Since I Left Your World" — 3:31
2. "Slow Down" — 3:13
3. "...And We Sing the Melody" — 3:30
4. "Hey Lauren" — 3:53
5. "Eighty Eight Keys" — 3:51

== Band members ==
- Ryan Dunson - Vocals, acoustic guitar
- Mike Kamerman - Guitars, backing vocals
- Daniel Kerrigan - Piano, synths, pads

Additional Musicians

- Zach Reichart - Guitar
- Brian Davitt - Bass
- Jordan Young - Drums (Joined in October 2009, before the release)
- Tyler Humphrey - Drums, percussion (Listed within the insert, but was not in the band when the EP was released)
