= Crack Attic =

Compilation album by Crack the Sky
- Released: 1994
- Recorded: 1975–1981
- Genre: Rock
- Length: 76:15
- Label: Renaissance

Crack Attic is a compilation of songs from the first five studio albums by Crack the Sky. It draws most heavily from their 1975 debut and 1976 follow-up, with more than half of the tracks here taken from those two releases.

== Track listing ==
All tracks are written by John Palumbo, except where noted.

No.	Title	Original Album	Length
1.	"Hold On"	Crack the Sky	3:00
2.	"Surf City"	Crack the Sky	3:54
3.	"She's a Dancer"	Crack the Sky	3:53
4.	"Mind Baby"	Crack the Sky	4:31
5.	"Ice"	Crack the Sky	4:37
6.	"We Want Mine"	Animal Notes	4:51
7.	"Maybe I Can Fool Everybody (Tonight)"	Animal Notes	5:56
8.	"Rangers at Midnight"	Animal Notes	7:34
9.	"Invaders from Mars"	Animal Notes	3:30
10.	"Nuclear Apathy"	Safety in Numbers	8:31
11.	"Long Nights"	Safety in Numbers	3:56
12.	"Lighten Up McGraw" (Rob Stevens, Rick Witkowski, Joe Macre)	Safety in Numbers	5:08
13.	"White Music"	White Music	4:12
14.	"Hot Razors in My Heart"	White Music	4:48
15.	"Poptown"	White Music	3:48
16.	"Flamingo Prelude/Too Nice for That"	Photoflamingo	4:06

== Personnel ==
=== The band ===
- Joe Macre — Bass guitar, back-up vocals
- Rick Witkowski — Guitar, back-up vocals
- John Palumbo — Bass guitar, vocals, keyboards, guitar, piano
- Gary Lee Chappell — Lead vocals ("Nuclear Apathy", "Lighten Up McGraw")
- Joey D'Amico — Drums, back-up vocals, lead vocals ("Long Nights")
- Vince DePaul — Synthesizer, keyboards
- Jim Griffiths — guitar, back-up vocals

=== Additional musicians ===
- Terence P. Minogue — Horn
- Michael Brecker — Horn ("She's a Dancer", "Mind Baby")
- Randy Brecker — Horn ("She's a Dancer", "Mind Baby")
- David Sanborn — Horn ("She's a Dancer", "Mind Baby")
