= Crack the Sky (disambiguation) =

Crack the Sky is an American rock band.

Crack the Sky may also refer to:

- Crack the Sky (Crack the Sky album), 1975
- Crack the Sky (Mylon LeFevre and Broken Heart album), 1987
- "Crack the Sky", a song by Buckethead
- "Crack the Sky", a song by Amon Amarth from the album Berserker, 2019

== See also ==
- "Play Crack the Sky", a song by the band Brand New from Deja Entendu, 2003
- Crack the Skye, a 2009 album by Mastodon
- Crack in the Sky, a 1997 novel by Terry C. Johnston
