= Love Never Fails =

Love Never Fails may refer to:

- Love Never Fails (B. E. Taylor album), 2006
- Love Never Fails (Jahméne Douglas album), 2013
- Love Never Fails (Micah Stampley album), 2013
- "Love Never Fails" (Brandon Heath song), 2009
- "Love Never Fails" (Kathie Lee Gifford song), 2000; covered by Sandy & Junior, 2002

== See also ==
- Love Never Faileth, a 1984 book by Eknath Easwaran
