= Crack the Sky =

American progressive rock band

- Crack the Sky, circa 1976; L-R: Jim Griffiths, Rick Witkowski, John Palumbo, Joey D'Amico, Joe Macre

Background information
- Origin: Weirton, West Virginia
- Genre: Progressive rock
- Years active: 1975–1978, 1980–1983, 1986–1990, 1996–present
- Labels: Lifesong, Grudge, Red Line, Winthrop, Aluminum Cat, Loud & Proud, Carry On Music, Adobo Records, Iconoclassic records
- Members: John Palumbo; Rick Witkowski; Joey D'Amico; Carey Ziegler; Bobby Hird; Bill Hubauer
- Past members: Glenn Workman; Dave Demarco; Jim Griffiths; Robert “Chic” DiCiccio; Vince DePaul; Gary Lee Chapell; Rob Stevens; John Tracey; Joe Macre; Sonny Petrosky; Michael Taylor; Barry Siegfried; Jamie LaRitz; Nat Kerr; Ronnie Zebron
- Website: www.crackthesky.com

Crack the Sky is an American progressive rock band formed in Weirton, West Virginia, in the early 1970s. In 1975, Rolling Stone declared their first album the "debut album of the year", and in 1978, Rolling Stone Record Guide compared them to Steely Dan. Their first three albums charted on the Billboard 200. In 2015, their debut album was ranked number 47 in the Rolling Stone list of "50 Greatest Prog Rock Albums of All Time ". The band continues to release albums and perform to a small but devoted fan base.

== History ==
=== 1970s ===
Crack the Sky traces its roots to early-seventies bands called Uncle Louie and Sugar. Uncle Louie featured John Palumbo on vocals and Rick Witkowski on guitar, while Sugar featured Joe Macre on bass and Jim Griffiths on guitar. Witkowski and Palumbo had auditioned for Terry Minogue, a nephew of Terry Cashman of CashWest Productions. Minogue convinced CashWest to give them a development deal so they could get a band together and record demos. Minogue later said, "They played some of the most beautiful music I ever heard in my life." Words (as the band was then known), initially a 10-piece band, downsized to five core members. The first incarnation of Crack the Sky included drummer Joey D'Amico, bassist Joe Macre, John Palumbo, Rick Witkowski and Jim Griffiths on guitar. During that time, CashWest Productions started Lifesong Records, and Crack the Sky became the first band to release an album on that label.

In 1975, the band released their first album, the critically acclaimed eponymous Crack the Sky, which reached 161 on the Billboard 200 album chart. Although praised by The New York Times and declared the "debut album of the year" by Rolling Stone, promotion and distribution problems with Lifesong Records prevented its widespread success. According to Terry Minogue, "Records were promised but never arrived at the distribution centers. The record would be on the radio but there would be no product on the store shelves or visa versa [sic]. When people wanted it, it would never be available." By what some termed blind luck, the marketing did work in Baltimore, only because a surplus of records was shipped there and put on display in stores when the album was receiving radio play. Subsequently, the album became very popular in Baltimore. Laidback Larry Allen, music director at WYDD in Pittsburgh, professed love for the album and played Crack the Sky in heavy rotation, but no other place did. In 2015, their debut album was ranked number 47 in the Rolling Stone list of "50 Greatest Prog Rock Albums of All Time".

Animal Notes, the band's second album, was intended originally as a rock opera about the Royal Canadian Mounted Police, but in production, the concept was reduced to only one song, "Rangers at Midnight". Like the band's debut release, it too was critically acclaimed, reaching number 142 on the Billboard 200 album chart, performing better than their first album. This time, the high concept and lack of "radio singles", due to the band's disdain for commercial music, contributed to lack of sales. The song "We Want Mine" was a slam at Lifesong Records for royalty withholdings.

By this time, Crack the Sky had finished two cross-country tours and had opened for Styx, Supertramp, Rush, Foreigner, Electric Light Orchestra, Yes, ZZ Top, Kansas, Edgar Winter, Frank Zappa, and Boston.

As a result of a breakdown in communications with the band's record label, and a divergence in creative approaches to the music, Palumbo left the band in 1977 to pursue a solo career. The remaining band members, with new vocalist Gary Lee Chappell, Philadelphia guitarist Barry Siegfried, and Pittsburgh keyboardist Vince DePaul, released Safety in Numbers in 1978. Safety in Numbers reached 126 on the Billboard 200 album chart, their highest-charting album. Promoting Safety in Numbers, Crack the Sky opened for Heart's 1978 Dog and Butterfly tour. Later that year, the band released an album of live concert performances, Live Sky.

Due to ongoing contractual difficulties with Lifesong, members of Crack the Sky agreed they had no choice but to disband. Following the band's dissolution, Classic Crack, a greatest-hits compilation, was released by Lifesong in 1980.

=== 1980s ===
In 1980, Palumbo reunited with Witkowski and DePaul to reform the band and released White Music later that year. This record featured a number of the "singles-quality" songs that had earlier proved elusive to the band, including "All American Boy", "Skin Deep", "Techni Generation", and "Hot Razors in My Heart". "Techni Generation" saw small airplay in the Pittsburgh area during this time.

After the release of the album, the band was put on hiatus, as Witkowski, Macre, and D'Amico went back to the Pittsburgh area to work with the vocalist/songwriter Bill Taylor and formed the B.E. Taylor Group. They released an independent 12" EP and eventually signed to MCA records for two full-length LPs: Innermission and Love Won the Fight. The group's catchy single release of "Vitamin L" (written by Witkowski, produced by Macre and Witkowski, and sung by D'Amico) from the latter album found its way into Billboard's Hot 100 chart in 1984. The success of this single led to the group being signed to CBS Records, where they recorded and released a third album, Our World in 1986.

Meanwhile, Palumbo reformed Crack the Sky once again in 1981 with DePaul, Carey Ziegler, Bobby Hird, and John Tracey, and produced Photoflamingo. This new lineup of musicians, and subsequent efforts, including World in Motion 1 and the live album The End, failed to garner the critical and public acclaim of the earlier releases, and the group disbanded again in 1983. A notable song from this era is "All Fly Away", about the fears of nuclear holocaust.

By the mid-1980s, Palumbo had returned to his solo career, releasing the avant garde album Blowing Up Detroit in 1985. It was also around this time that Palumbo began collaborating on songwriting for the Hagerstown, Maryland-based hard rock/glam metal band Kix. He would go on to co-write this band's most commercially successful single, "Don't Close Your Eyes".

Palumbo released the studio album Raw under the Crack the Sky name in 1986. Although the album has the signature Crack the Sky sound and feel to it, it featured no past members of the band besides Palumbo (guitarist Jamie LaRitz is the only other musician credited). Later that year, however, Palumbo reunited Crack the Sky with Witkowski, Hird, DePaul, Ziegler, and D'Amico for a series of live shows at the Baltimore club Hammerjack's. Between then and 1989, this band performed a number of shows in the Baltimore area, including Painters Mill Music Fair.

In 1988, Palumbo joined with Witkowski, DePaul, and D'Amico to produce From the Greenhouse, in many ways a return to the band's classic sound, with solid efforts including the title track and the song "Lost in America" The album peaked at 186 on the Billboard 200, and received a mixed review from People. During this time, this lineup performed occasionally in the Baltimore area with Ziegler joining on bass.

=== 1990s ===
Crack the Sky released Dog City in 1990. The period between then and 1996 saw little activity except for the release of the compilation disc Rare! in 1994. During this time, Witkowski composed music for a number of game shows on the children's television network Nickelodeon, including Guts and Figure It Out.

Palumbo gathered the band together again in 1996, beginning a series of live shows at small venues in the Baltimore area. The band at this time featured the same lineup as 1983's The End, with the addition of Nat Kerr (who had participated with Crack the Sky members Witkowski, Macre, and D'Amico in the B.E. Taylor Group around the same time as The End's release) on keyboards. A new studio album, Cut, was released in 1999, as well as a double-disc release featuring one of the band's live shows at the Recher Theatre in Towson, Maryland.

=== 2000s ===
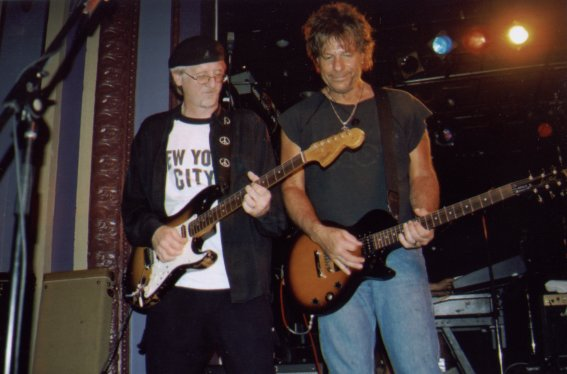
Crack The Sky (Rick Witkowski and John Palumbo), June 26, 2004

Crack the Sky continues to perform occasional live shows and collaborate on new music under Palumbo's guidance. The albums Ghost and Dogs from Japan were released to critical acclaim in 2001 and 2003, respectively. The band completed a new concept album in 2007, entitled The Sale, which features the band's original bassist Joe Macre performing in the band and producing the record.

In 2008, Joey D'Amico and Joe Macre returned as Crack the Sky's drummer and bassist, respectively. Additionally, the band headlined the ROSfest progressive music festival, and later a full-length DVD of their performance from that show and another performance called Crack the Sky, All Access was produced by Studio M Live, Inc. with audio engineered by Macre. The DVD was shot on seven hi-def cameras. with audio in 5.1 surround sound and includes pictures by Studio M Live, Inc. and interviews with the band members.

=== 2010s ===
2010 saw the release of Machine, a concept album of sorts, again featuring 4/5 of the original Crack the Sky lineup.

Their next album, Ostrich, was released in late 2012. It signaled a return of Crack the Sky to its earlier sound. One review noted: "Not since the band's incredibly popular 'White Music' CD, has Crack the Sky delivered a collection of pop/rock songs that sting while making you smile. Satirical, smirky commentary, wrapped in up tempo – yes, you can dance to it – music. Writer, Palumbo, has either hit a manic phase or is attempting to get our attention via the back door. In any event, this remarkable band, once again, shows their ability to shift gears while keeping their artistic integrity intact."

In 2015, the group released their 16th studio album, The Beauty of Nothing, featuring the songs "Rachel" and the title track, "The Beauty of Nothing", both of which would be rerecorded for the 2018 release, Crackology.

The band released the single "Red Rosary" in 2016 and offered it as a free download from their website. This song was also included in the 2018 release, Living in Reverse.

Two new albums were released on August 24, 2018: Living in Reverse, their 17th studio album, featured all-new Palumbo penned songs, while Crackology, their 18th studio album, featured rerecordings of many of the band's most beloved fan-favorite songs from their large and diverse catalog.

=== 2020s ===
Tribes was released on January 15, 2021. It is the 19th studio album, featuring new songs as well as a new version of John Palumbo's 1985 solo track "Blowing Up Detroit".

Between the Cracks, a compilation of deep cuts, was released on July 2, 2021.

Crack the Sky continues to perform fairly regularly, mainly in the eastern part of the United States.

=== Current lineup (2012–present) ===
- John Palumbo – Vocals, Guitars, Keyboards
- Bobby Hird – Guitars, Mandolin, Dobro, Banjo, Vocals
- Carey Ziegler– Bass, Vocals
- Bill Hubauer – Keyboards, Vocals, Sax
- Rick Witkowski – Guitars, Ukulele, Vocals
- Joey D'Amico – Drums, Vocals

== Discography ==
=== Full-length albums ===
| Release date | Title | Label |
|---|---|---|
| 1975 | Crack the Sky | Lifesong |
| 1976 | Animal Notes | Lifesong |
| 1976 | Live on WBAB | Lifesong |
| 1978 | Safety in Numbers | Lifesong |
| 1978 | Live Sky | Lifesong |
| 1980 | Classic Crack | Lifesong |
| 1980 | White Music | Lifesong |
| 1981 | Photoflamingo | Lifesong |
| 1983 | World in Motion 1 | Criminal |
| 1984 | The End | Criminal |
| 1986 | Raw | Grudge |
| 1989 | From the Greenhouse | Grudge |
| 1990 | Dog City | Grudge |
| 1994 | Rare! | Yodelin' Pig |
| 1994 | Crack Attic | Renaissance |
| 1998 | Cut | Stepford Wives (re-released in 2007 by Aluminum Cat Recordings) |
| 2000 | The Best of the Rest (And Then Some) | Winthrop |
| 2000 | Live—Recher Theatre 06.19.99 | Aluminum Cat Recordings |
| 2001 | Ghost | Aluminum Cat Recordings |
| 2004 | Dogs from Japan | Aluminum Cat Recordings |
| 2006 | Alive and Kickin' Ass | Lifesong |
| 2007 | The Sale | Aluminum Cat Recordings |
| 2010 | Machine | Aluminum Cat Recordings |
| 2012 | Ostrich | Aluminum Cat Recordings |
| 2015 | The Beauty of Nothing | Aluminum Cat Recordings |
| 2018 | Living in Reverse | Loud & Proud Records |
| 2018 | Crackology | Loud & Proud Records |
| 2021 | Crack Attic | Renaissance Records |
| 2021 | Tribes | Carry On Music |
| 2021 | Between the Cracks | Carry On Music |
| 2023 | From the Wood | Aluminum Cat Recordings |
| 2024 | The Baker Files | Adobo Records |
| 2025 | Live First Album | Adobo Records |
| 2025 | Blessed | Adobo Records |

=== Live performance DVD ===
- Crack the Sky: All Access (2009, Aluminum Cat Recordings / Studio M Live, Inc.)

=== Compilation appearances ===
- Supper's Ready—A Tribute to Genesis (1995, Magna Carta) (song: "I Know What I Like (In Your Wardrobe)")
  - John Palumbo (keyboards, guitars, lead vocals), Ian Palumbo (guitars, backup vocals), Tim Deaner (backup vocals), Dr. Maurice Hayes (narration)
- Spider-man: Rock Reflections of a Superhero (1975 Lifesong / Digital Music Works)
  - John Palumbo (keyboards), Rick Witkowski (percussion), Jim Griffiths (guitar), Joe Macre (bass), and others

== Band member timeline ==
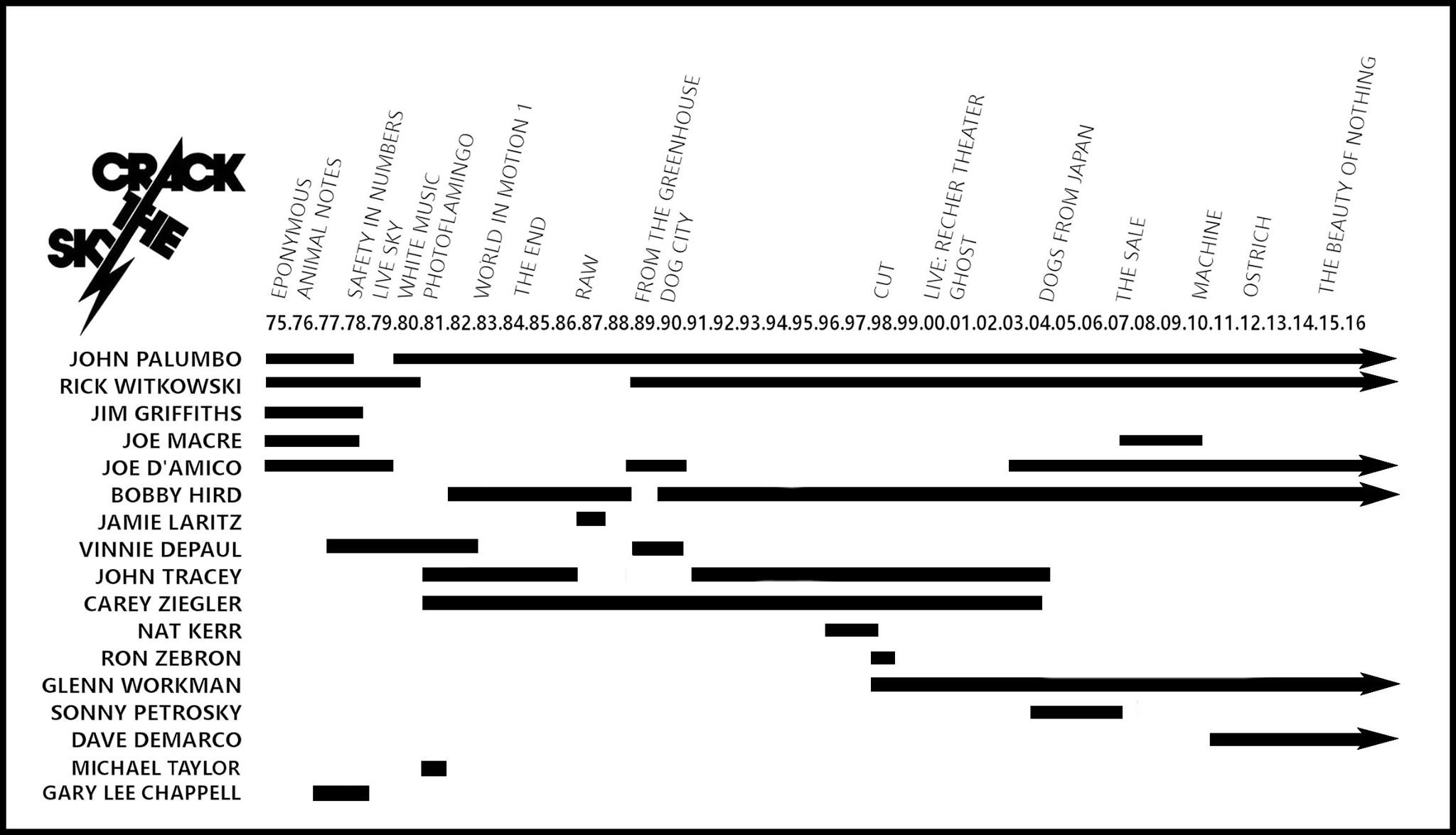
Musician timeline

== Crack Pack horn section ==
Sometimes a horn section—known as the Crack Pack Horns—accompanies the band at live shows or on album tracks.

- Tom Williams — trumpet (1980s–1990s)
- Tom McCormick — tenor saxophone (1980s)
- Dave Fairall — tenor & alto saxophone (1980s–2000)
- Paul Soroka — lyricon (1980s–1990s)
- Chris Walker — trumpet (1990s–2000)
- J.J. Gunning — trombone (1990s–2000)
- Ronnie Fowler — horns (1986)
- Jim Stienfeld — horns (1986)
- Keith Zaffino — horns (1986)
- Dave Makowiecki — trumpet (2000–present)
- Barry Caudill — tenor saxophone (2000–present)
- Jim McFalls — trombone (2000–present)
