= Dog City (disambiguation) =

Dog City may refer to:

- Dog City, an animated television series aired from 1992 to 1994
- Dog City (Crack the Sky album)
- Dog City (Matt Mays album)
