= The Most Beautiful (album) =

Studio album by Rookie of the Year
- Released: 7 June 2010
- Recorded: January – April 2010
- Genres: Indie rock Pop rock Acoustic; Electropop
- Label: The Future Destination Records
- Producer: Matt Malpass

Rookie of the Year chronology
Sweet Attention (2008)	The Most Beautiful (2010)	The Goodnight Moon part II (2013)

The Most Beautiful is the fourth full-length studio album by American indie rock band Rookie of the Year and the first solo album by the last remaining member and vocalist Ryan Dunson. This is the first album by Rookie of the Year that will not be released by their previous record label One Eleven Records instead being released on Future Destination Records. The Most Beautiful was recorded in Atlanta, Georgia at Marigolds+Monsters. The album was scheduled to be released on May 25, 2010, worldwide but was delayed one week to June 1. A few weeks later the album was further delayed by one week, finally being released two weeks after the initial planned release date, on June 7, 2010.

The album features collaborations with Brett Detar of The Juliana Theory, Matt Thiessen of Relient K, Andrew Goldstein of The Friday Night Boys, and Erika Lauren of Hawkeye and MTV's The Real World: D.C.. The album features an electropop style unheard in previous Rookie of the Year albums.

== Critical reception ==
The album was rated 2.5 out of 5 stars by Evan Lucy of Alternative Press.

== Track listing ==
No.	Title	Length
1.	"Run Away"	4:22
2.	"Frustrated (Hurricane)"	3:33
3.	"Turn the Page (100 Miles)"	3:27
4.	"Bizarre Love Triangle"	2:11
5.	"Don't Tear Me Apart"	3:41
6.	"Spinning Around (co-written with Brett Detar)"	3:33
7.	"Stars Fade Blue"	4:09
8.	"Take These Words"	3:20
9.	"Hit Single (Bonus Track)"	3:16
10.	"Inside (Bonus Track)"	3:45

== Personnel ==
- Ryan Dunson
