= Always Right As in We Are =

Always Right As In We Are

EP by Rory
- Released: June 22, 2004
- Recorded: 2004
- Genre: Alternative rock
- Length: 18:33
- Label: One Eleven Records
- Producer: Chris Fudurich, assisted by Jay Gordon

Rory chronology
Always Right As In We Are (2004)	We're Up To No Good, We're Up To No Good (2006)

Always Right As In We Are is Rory's 2004 One Eleven Records debut EP. The album was produced by Chris Fudurich.

== Track listing ==
1. "Deja Vroom" - 3:57
2. "This Could Have Been A Dance Dance Revolution; But Now It's Just A Dance" - 3:30
3. "Conversations With Strangers (Little Secrets)" - 3:00
4. "Packed More Trunks Than The Jersey Mob" - 4:12
5. "The Sick Six Hundred" - 3:51
