= We're Up to No Good, We're Up to No Good =

Studio album by Rory
- Released: September 21, 2006
- Recorded: 2006
- Genre: Alternative rock
- Length: 56:10
- Label: One Eleven
- Producers: John Avila; Mark Hoppus

Rory chronology
| Always Right As in We Are (2004) | We're Up to No Good, We're Up to No Good (2006) |

Professional ratings
Review scores
| Source | Rating |
|---|---|
| AbsolutePunk.net | 94% link |

We're Up To No Good, We're Up To No Good, is Rory's 2006 One Eleven Records debut. The album was produced by Mark Hoppus (lead singer/bassist of blink-182 and +44) and John Avila (former bassist of Oingo Boingo).

== Reception ==
"(Rory's new album is) all the best parts of the first Taking Back Sunday record mixed with all the best parts of the first Brand New record." Alternative Press 11/06

"The raw ambition and ultimately the fun factor of We're Up To No Good, We're Up To No Good rank it up there with my favorite CDs of 2006." - Tony Pascarella of Absolutepunk.net

== Track listing ==
1. "The State of How" – 1:39
2. "Typical" – 3:53
3. "Kind of Like Chloroformity (Cheers to Another One)" – 3:28
4. "Deja Vrooomier" – 4:02
5. "Doin' Lines of Conga"
6. "Tonight I Just Don't Care, I'm Having A Candy Dinner" – 3:46
7. "Nice Planet. We'll Take It." – 3:29
8. "Your Will or Whatever" – 4:01
9. "The Adventures of Me & Me (Starring Me & Me)" – 3:41
10. "It's On, Señor...¡GO!" – 3:50
11. "Hey Pt. 1, 2 & 4" – 5:11
12. "Everybody Stabbed Me and It Didn't Even Hurt" – 15:21
