= Keep Your Eyes Off the Prize =

EP by Spark Is a Diamond
- Released: November 14, 2006
- Studio: Valencia Studios (Brookville, Maryland)
- Genre: Hardcore punk; new wave; metalcore; screamo; mathcore; trance; emo
- Length: 11:36
- Label: Emerald Moon
- Producer: Paul Leavitt

Spark Is a Diamond chronology
Keep Your Eyes Off the Prize (2006)	Try This On for Size (2008)

Keep Your Eyes Off the Prize is the debut EP by American hardcore punk band Spark Is a Diamond, released on November 14, 2006, through Emerald Moon Records. It was produced, recorded and engineered by Paul Leavitt (All Time Low, Thin Dark Line) and mixed by Matt Bayles (The Blood Brothers, These Arms Are Snakes).

A music video was made for the track "Check Your Lease, You're In F**k City" directed by Adam Kobylarz.

== Background and recording ==
When the group was formed, they were originally named The Hush Hush until they had to change their name to not be confused with another band with the same name and didn't want to infringe the name. The band ultimately decided to rename themselves Spark is a Diamond on July 16. The group signed into indie record label Emerald Moon Records on June 22 and started production on their debut EP.

It was produced, recorded and engineered by Paul Leavitt (All Time Low, Thin Dark Line) and mixed by Matt Bayles (The Blood Brothers, These Arms Are Snakes), mastered by Michael Fossenkemper and designed by Dan Miller of The JonBenét.

Some of the songs were brought to the band's debut album Try This On for Size on Pluto Records. The EP features Matt Hall on drums before Joseph Crawford and also features Ben Hirschhorn of Moring for the Masses.

== Release and promotion ==
On November 10, 2006, the band made a CD release party at the Morningstar Church in Quakertown, PA.

On March 30, 2007, the band released a music video for the track "Check Your Lease, You're In F**k City," directed by Adam Kobylarz. A review form Smother says "a surprising underground hit of manic dance-fueled punk rock that no one would have ever seen coming."

== Track listing ==
All tracks are written by Spark Is a Diamond.

No.	Title	Length
1.	"Scandalous, Scandalous"	1:02
2.	"Check Your Lease, You're in F**k City"	2:28
3.	"________ ________ Has a Deathwish"	2:48
4.	"Oh, Captain!"	2:16
5.	"Urgent"	2:16
Total length:		11:36

== Personnel ==
Spark Is a Diamond

- Alison Bellavance – lead vocals
- Matt Boylan – vocals and guitars
- Matt Hall – drums

Additional personnel

- Ben Hirschhorn of Morning for the Masses – additional vocals (track 3)

Technical personnel

- Dann Miller of The Jonbenét – artwork and layout
- Paul Leavitt – producer, recording and engineer
- Michael Fossenkemper – mastering
- Matt Bayles – mixing
- Brian Pollock – electronics (tracks: 2, 4)
