= B. E. Taylor Christmas 2 =

Studio album by B. E. Taylor
- Released: 2002
- Genre: Christian rock, pop rock
- Length: 59:09
- Label: Chrishae
- Producer: B. E. Taylor, Rick Witkowski

B. E. Taylor chronology
| Try Love (1997) | B. E. Taylor Christmas 2 (2002) | One Nation Under God (2004) |

B. E. Taylor Christmas 2 is the third album by solo artist B. E. Taylor. It was released in 2002, and is the continuation of B.E.'s first album, B. E. Taylor Christmas. The album features 10 renditions of popular Christmas songs and 3 original songs.

== Track listing ==
1. "I Saw Three Ships" – 5:38
2. "Feel the Love of Christmas" – 4:23
3. "Mary, Did You Know?" – 4:02
4. "Hark The Herald Angels Sing" – 6:05
5. "Let There Be Peace On Earth" – 6:19
6. "The First Noel" – 6:11
7. "Away In The Manger/Do You Hear What I Hear?" – 5:49
8. "Sweet Little Jesus Baby/Go Tell It On The Mountain" – 4:23
9. "Feel The Love Of Christmas" (acoustic) – 4:23
10. "Light Of The Stable" – 4:18
11. "I Will Remember" – 4:45
