= The Bell and the Hammer =

Studio album by This Day and Age
- Released: August 22, 2006
- Genre: Indie rock
- Length: 58:51
- Label: One Eleven Records
- Producer: Ed Rose and This Day & Age

This Day and Age chronology
Always Leave the Ground (2004)	The Bell and the Hammer (2006)

Professional ratings
Review scores
Source	Rating
Allmusic	link
EmotionalPunk.com	link

The Bell and the Hammer, is the third album released by This Day and Age on its label One Eleven Records.

== Track listing ==
1. Always Straight Ahead - 5:10
2. Second Star to the Right - 4:48
3. The Bell and the Hammer - 5:13
4. More of a Climb, Less of a Walk - 6:33
5. Sara, Poor Sara - 4:46
6. Eustace - 4:39
7. Walking Contradictions - 4:44
8. Building a Home - 4:27
9. Winter Winter Spring - 3:46
10. Practice Makes Better - 4:06
11. Of Course We've All Seen the Sun - 4:40
12. All We Thought We Could - 5:34
