= Recher Theatre =

Concert venue in Towson, Maryland, US

Coordinates: 39°24′3.1″N 76°36′6.7″W

The Recher
- Formerly Recher Theatre
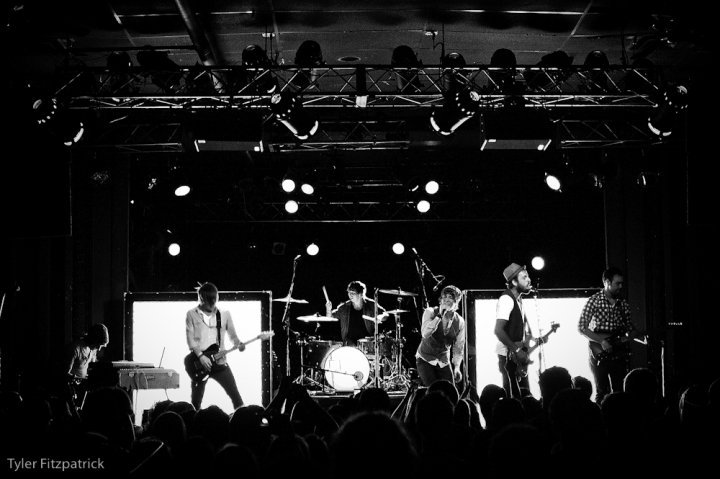
- Oh, The Story! on stage at the Recher Theatre in Towson, MD – April 30, 2010
- Interactive map of The Recher
- Location: 512 York Road, Towson, MD
- Owner: Brian Recher
- Capacity: 700
- Type: Music Venue
- Events: acoustic rock, alternative rock, blues (music), blues rock, electronic, folk, garage, groove, hard rock, hip hop, heavy metal, indie, punk, reggae, rock, surf, rhythm and blues, singer-songwriters

Construction
- Opened: 1999
- Closed: 2013
- Reopened: 2021

The Recher /rɛkɜːr/ is a concert venue in Towson, Maryland. It is located at 512 York Road in the building previously operated as the Towson Theatre, a one-screen movie theater. The Towson Theatre was designed by architect John Ahlers of the George Norbury MacKenzie III architectural firm. It cost $100,000 to build and opened on March 1, 1928. The theatre was sold to the Recher family in the 1950s, who continued running the cinema into the 1990s. They then converted it into an upscale billiard parlor. The building was later transformed into The Recher Theatre, a concert venue, which opened in 1999.

The small venue with a capacity of only 700 hosted many national acts over the years, including: Aimee Mann, Andrew W.K., All Time Low, Anberlin, Bo Diddley, Boondox, Breaking Benjamin, Buckethead, Buckcherry, Charlie Daniels Band, Cheap Trick, Crack The Sky, Danyul Reyman Blues Band, Danzig, Dark Star Orchestra, Demon Hunter, Disco Biscuits, Electric Light Orchestra, Flaming Lips, Fuel, George Clinton, Good Charlotte, Iggy Pop, Jeffree Star, Judas Priest, Linkin Park, Little Feat, O.A.R., Papa Roach, Puddle of Mudd, Reel Big Fish, Robert Cray, Shinedown, Slayer, They Might Be Giants, Third Eye Blind, The White Stripes, Thirty Seconds to Mars, Mr. Bungle, and Zakk Wylde.

== Closure ==
The Recher Theater closed in 2013.

It enjoyed a strong run as one of the area's premier music venues, but was eventually squeezed out by larger venues. The Recher ended its days as a live music staple with a sold-out fundraising concert titled "The Last Hurrah!" featuring 17 bands, many of which had played at the Recher over the last decade. The bands performing included The Hint, American Diary, Thin Dark Line, Dropout Year, All Mighty Senators, Warren Boes/Andy Belt, Burning Rosewood, Shane from Valencia, Evan Michael, The Everlove/Adelphi, Japan 4 Japan 4 band shows, Hectic Red, Technicolor Minivan, Oh the Story, Brighter Shades, Rob Fahey & Pieces, Monday Night Social Club Band, Serena Miller & Riot, The Regal Begals, and Ashes Remain. All proceeds were donated to Catherine's Fund For Cystic Fibrosis, associated with the Maryland Chapter of the Cystic Fibrosis Foundation.

The Recher Theatre space was converted into a nightclub known as Torrent Nightclub. The change was attributed to the rise of popularity of DJs and electronic dance music. Recher said, "The market for live music is down, and the local music scene, as well, wasn't what it used to be." After nearly a year of construction, the Torrent Nightclub opened on Thursday, Feb 13, 2014, featuring British DJs EC Twins.

== Reopening ==
In June 2020, owner Brian Recher announced that the space would rebrand and reopen as The Recher at a future date. It was revealed in early March 2021 that The Recher would reopen on March 19, 2021, initially with limited capacity shows due to the COVID-19 pandemic.
