= Spark Is a Diamond =

American hardcore punk band

- Also known as: The Hush Hush
- Origin: Philadelphia, Pennsylvania, U.S.
- Genres: Hardcore punk; new wave; trance; metalcore; screamo; mathcore; emo
- Years active: 2006-2009
- Labels: Emerald Moon; Pluto
- Past members: Alison Bellavance; Matt Boylan; Joseph Crawford; Matt Hall

Spark Is a Diamond was an American hardcore punk band formed in Philadelphia, Pennsylvania, in summer of 2006. It combined punk and hardcore with heavy dance beats and alternating female/male vocals. The group originally consisted of three members: vocalist Alison Bellavance, guitarist/vocalist Matt Boylan, and drummer Matt Hall. Hall left the band in 2007 and was soon replaced by Joseph Crawford. The band features former members from bands such Fall River and Morning For The Masses. They were influenced by The Blood Brothers, Boy Crazy, and Cursive.

They started by signing into Emerald Moon Records and releasing their debut EP Keep Your Eyes Off The Prize (2006).

The band signed into Pluto Records and released the debut studio album Try This On For Size (2008). The album was named “Best Punk Album of 2008” by About.com.

On September 17, 2009, vocalist Alison Bellavance posted a blog entry on MySpace stating that the band had broken up due to "personal issues."

== History ==
=== 2006: Early years and Keep Your Eyes Off the Prize ===
Spark Is a Diamond was formed in Philadelphia, Pennsylvania, Summer of 2006. The group consists of lead vocalist Alison Bellavance, guitarist/vocalist Matt Boylan, and drummer Matt Hall. The band was formed by former members from different bands, Alison Bellavance and Matt Boylan were from Fall River while Matt Hall was from Morning For The Masses.

When the group was formed, they were originally named The Hush Hush until they had to change their name to not be confused with another band with the same name and didn't want to infringe the name. The band ultimately decided to rename themselves Spark Is a Diamond on July 16.

The group signed into indie record label Emerald Moon Records on June 22 and started production on their debut EP, the project was being worked with Paul Leavitt (All Time Low, Thin Dark Line) and Matt Bayles (The Blood Brothers, These Arms Are Snakes). On November 14, 2006, the group released the debut EP Keep Your Eyes Off The Prize. The band dropped a music video for the track “Check Your Lease, You're In F**k City" directed by Adam Kobylarz the following year.

=== 2007-2009: Try This On for Size and disbandment ===
After the release of the EP, Hall unexpectedly left the band and was soon replaced by Joseph Crawford of Hometown Anthem sometime in 2007. Later that year, the group released a short remix EP You Can’t Stop (Deathwish Remixes) from Keep Yours Eyes Off The Prize with Dave Watt of Girlfight making the cover art. The band caught the eyes of Pluto Records who signed them on January 31, 2008 and the band started working on their debut album with Paul Leavitt once again, Matt Bayles, Dann Miler of The Jonbenét, and Michael Fossenkemper. On March 25, 2008, the band showcased some of their songs on MySpace and announced that Chad Middleton from VCR will feature in the effort on Blabbermouth.

Leading up to the release, the band held a CD release party before the release on May 3, 2008, only in physical form with My America, Girlfight, HeyHey, and Innerpartysystem. The band officially released their debut studio album Try This On For Size on May 6, 2008. The record was met with mixed to positive reviews from All Music, About.com, AbsolutePunk, Lambgoat and more. The band announced a music video shoot on May 10 in 10 S. Main ST. Quakertown PA, where fans can attend and appear on the band's music video. The music video was released on May 31, 2008, it was for the track “President of The Wrong Crowd” and it was directed by Adam Kobylarz. The track "Check Your Lease, You're In F**k City" appeared in Hardcore, Punk, Etc. 2008 on RevHQ. The group appeared in issue #46 of Decibel Magazine where they review the band's album.

On January 5, 2009, Try This On For Size was named “Best Punk Album of 2008” by About.com, defeating established acts such as The Briggs, Bob Mould, Rise Against, Street Dogs and more. On September 18, 2009, lead vocalist Alison Bellavance announced on a Myspace blog that the band is no more due to "personal issues."

== Musical styles and influences ==
Spark Is a Diamond was painted as a hardcore punk, new wave, post-hardcore, metalcore, screamo, and emo rock band.

They were influenced by The Blood Brothers, Boy Crazy, Cursive, Death From Above 1979, Everytime I Die, The Faint, Mars Volta, Pretty Girls Make Graves, These Arms Are Snakes, and Yeah Yeah Yeahs.

== Band members ==
- Alison Bellavance – vocals (2006-2009)
- Matt Boylan – vocals and guitars (2006-2009)
- Joseph Crawford – drums (2007-2009)
- Matt Hall – drums (2006-2007)

== Discography ==
=== Studio albums ===
- Try This On for Size (2008)

=== Extended plays ===
- Keep Your Eyes Off the Prize (2006)
- You Can't Stop (Deathwish Remixes) (2008)
