= Try This On for Size =

Studio album by Spark Is a Diamond
- Released: May 6, 2008
- Studio: Valencia Studios (Brookville, Maryland)
- Genre: Hardcore punk; new wave; metalcore; screamo; mathcore; emo
- Length: 24:12
- Label: Pluto
- Producer: Paul Leavitt

Spark Is a Diamond chronology
Keep Your Eyes Off the Prize (2006)	Try This On for Size (2008)

Try This On for Size is the debut studio album by American hardcore punk band Spark Is a Diamond, released on May 6, 2008, through Pluto Records. It was produced by Paul Leavitt and mixed by Matt Bayles. The album was named “Best Punk Album of 2008” by About.com, defeating established acts such as The Briggs, Bob Mould, Rise Against, Street Dogs and more.

== Background and recording ==
After signing with Pluto Records, the group quickly worked on their debut album. It was worked alongside Paul Leavitt, Matt Bayles, Dann Miler of The JonBenét, and Michael Fossenkemper at Turtle Tone Studios, Valencia studios, and Red Room Studios. On March 25, 2008, the band showcased some of their songs on MySpace and announced that Chad Middleton from VCR will feature in the effort on Blabbermouth. They also got Ben Hirschhorn of Morning for the Masses to feature as well. The album features both Hall and Crawford as Drums and also features a cover for Push It from Salt 'N Pepa.

On September 18, 2009, lead vocalist Alison Bellavance announced on a MySpace blog that the band was disbanding due to "personal issues."

== Release and promotion ==
Before the release, the band held a CD release party on May 3, 2008, only in physical form with My America, Girlfight, HeyHey, and Innerpartysystem. The band finally released their debut studio album Try This On For Size on May 6, 2008.

The band announced a music video shoot on May 10 in 10 S. Main ST. Quakertown PA, where fans can attend and appear on the band's next music video. The music video was released on May 31, 2008, it was for the track “President of The Wrong Crowd” and it was directed by Adam Kobylarz.

The track "Check Your Lease, You're In F**k City" appeared in Hardcore, Punk, Etc. 2008 on RevHQ.

== Reception ==
Professional ratings
Review scores
Source	Rating
About.com	4.5/5 stars
All Music	2.5/5 stars
Lambgoat	6/10
Theprp	3.5/5 stars
Teeth of the Divine	Positive
V13	Positive
Decibel Magazine	Positive
Allschools	8/10
Revolver Magazine	Positive
AbsolutePunk	Positive

The album was met with positive reviews from many major outlets. Ryan Cooper from About.com said that the album have "an amalgam that is aggressive and fun, making a sound perfect for fans both on the dance floor in back or the pit down in front." Revolver Magazine adds 'So ridiculous, it's kinda awesome." Theprp adds "brash, oddly catchy and often abrasive, yet thanks to a variety of elements, ultimately charming as well."

Eduardo Rivadavia from All Music was more critical of the album, stating "Try This on for Size's prevailing electronic beats are bound to shoo away most metal and hardcore purists on principle alone, while the tuneless screeching that must be endured throughout will clear the average dancefloor faster than a three alarm fire." Lambgoat thought the same to an extent, explaining "the electronic influence is at its worst gimmicky and at its best an unnecessary supplement."

Teeth of the Divine was generous to the effort, adding "a pretty decent party album for dance, screamo and pop fans all mashed together in one catchy, quirky little album that’s certainly not for ‘real’ metal heads, but will have some odd appeal to the more curious metal fan." Chee Kam from V13 was very impressed, describing to the album "a certain theme throughout all the art." The group appeared in issue #46 of Decibel Magazine where they review the band's album.

On January 5, 2009, Try This On For Size was named “Best Punk Album of 2008” by About.com, defeating established acts such as The Briggs, Bob Mould, Rise Against, Street Dogs and more.

== Track listing ==
All tracks are written by Spark Is a Diamond (tracks: 1 to 8, 10), Salt 'N Pepa (track 9), Tyler Lefebvre (track 11).

No.	Title	Writer(s)	Length
1.	"Diamonds Are Forever"		0:28
2.	"Try This On For Size"		2:40
3.	"____ ____ Has A Deathwish"		2:47
4.	"Look What You've Done To This Rock & Roll Town"		2:29
5.	"Check Your Lease, You're In F**k City"		2:29
6.	"President Of The Wrong Crowd"		2:20
7.	"Destination: Awesome"		2:42
8.	"Interlude"		0:54
9.	"Push It (Real Good)"	Salt 'N Pepa	2:28
10.	"Oh Captain!"		2:16
11.	"Re-Wish // Death-Mix"	Tyler Lefebvre	2:31
Total length:			24:12

== Personnel ==
Spark Is a Diamond

- Alison Bellavance – lead vocals
- Matt Boylan – vocals and guitars
- Joseph Crawford – drums
- Matt Hall – drums (tracks: 3, 5, 10)

Technical personnel

- Dann Miller of The JonBenét – artwork and layout
- Tyler Lefebvre – writer (track 11) and computer (tracks: 1, 8, 11)
- Brian Pollack – electronics (tracks: 5, 10)
- Chad Middleton of VCR – additional vocals (track 2)
- Ben Hirschhorn of Morning for the Masses – additional vocals (track 3)
- Michael Fossenkemper – mastering at Turtle Tone Studios
- Matt Bayles – mixing at Red Room Studios
- Matt Boylan – photography
- Paul Leavitt – producer, engineer and recording
- Salt 'N Pepa – writers (track 9)
