= Play with Fire (album) =

Play With Fire

Studio album by The Reign of Kindo
- Released: July 30, 2013
- Genre: Indie rock, jazz rock, alternative
- Length: 53:43
- Label: CandyRat Records
- Producer: The Reign of Kindo, Joseph Secchiaroli

The Reign of Kindo chronology
This Is What Happens (2010)	Play With Fire (2013)

Play With Fire is an album by the New York band The Reign of Kindo. It was officially released on July 30, 2013 as the band's third full-length studio album and first with newest member Danny Pizarro Jr. on piano. The album was also released by the band in an 8-bit/Chiptune style, entitled Play.

== Track listing ==
No.	Title	Length
1.	"The Hero, The Saint, The Tyrant, & The Terrorist"	4:49
2.	"Help It"	4:07
3.	"Sing When No One's Around"	3:57
4.	"Dust"	4:11
5.	"Impossible World"	5:14
6.	"Don't Haze Me"	3:55
7.	"Feeling in the Night"	5:25
8.	"Make a Sound"	3:58
9.	"Sunshine"	4:25
10.	"Romancing a Stranger"	4:38
11.	"I Hate Music"	5:12
12.	"The Man, the Wood, & the Stone"	3:52
Total length:		53:43

== Personnel ==
- Joseph Secchiaroli – voice and guitar
- Steven Padin – drums and percussion
- Daniel Pizarro – piano, synths, and pads
- Jeffrey Jarvis – bass
- Michael Carroll – guitar, percussion, and super sizes
- Richie English – string orchestrations (tracks 2, 4, 6, 9, 11, 12)
- Joel Gonzalez – trumpet
- Darren Escar – tenor saxophone
- Gretchen Fisher – violin (tracks 2, 4, 6, 9, 11, 12)
- Claire Fisher – violin (tracks 2, 4, 6, 9, 11, 12)
- Kiersten Fisher – viola (tracks 2, 4, 6, 9, 11, 12)
- Katie Weissman – cello (tracks 2, 4, 6, 9, 11, 12)
- Matthew Castronova – upright bass (track 10)
