= The Reign of Kindo =

US musical group

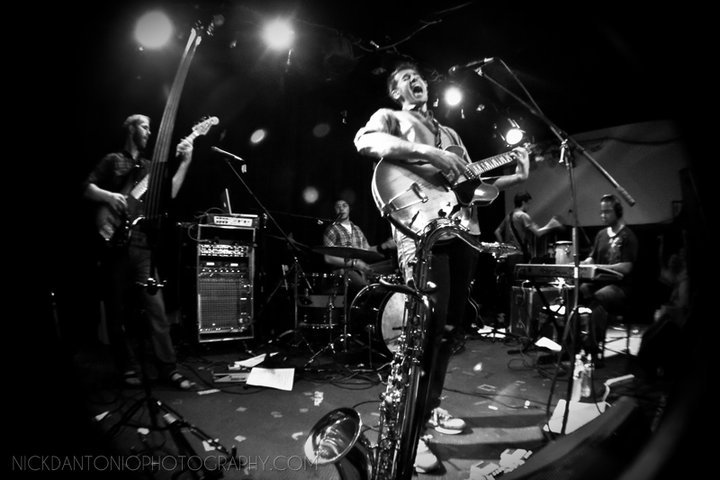

Background information
- Also known as: Kindo (2018–2020)
- Origin: Buffalo, New York, U.S.
- Genres: Indie rock; progressive rock; jazz rock; alternative rock; funk rock
- Years active: 2006–present
- Labels: Candyrat; 111
- Spinoff of: This Day and Age
- Members: Joseph Secchiaroli; Jeffrey Jarvis; Rocco DellaNeve; Kendall Lantz
- Past members: Steven Padin; Michael Carroll; Geraldo Castillo; Kelly Sciandra; John Baab; Darren Escar; Danny Pizarro; Rodney Flood; Amit Peled
- Website: Official website

The Reign of Kindo is an American rock band originating from Buffalo, New York, currently based out of New York City. They produce and release their music independently. They finance the creation of their recordings and videos by writing, producing and releasing a new original recording every month to their supporters on Patreon.

== History ==
The band formed in late 2006 from the remaining members of This Day and Age.

On August 21, 2007, the band released their first record, an EP entitled simply "The Reign of Kindo EP". The EP was a regional sales success, reaching No. 5 on the Billboard Middle Atlantic Heatseekers chart. In 2008, they began recording for their first full-length record, entitled "Rhythm, Chord & Melody" and released it through 111 Records on August 19, 2008.

The band's third record, an LP titled This Is What Happens, was released in August 2010 through Candyrat Records. The album was re-created in an 8-bit/Chiptune style by members Mike Carroll and Steven Padin, and released as This Is Also What Happens in the same year.

On July 30, 2013, the band released their 4th album, titled "Play With Fire", with its 8-bit/Chiptune counterpart simply entitled "Play".

In 2016, Rocco DellaNeve joined the band on piano, synthesizer and vocals.

On April 14, 2018, the band released their 5th album, titled "Happy However After", and released a statement along with it that confirmed a name change for the band, officially renaming themselves 'Kindo'.

In 2019, Kendall Lantz joined the band on drums.

== Members ==
=== Current members ===
- Joseph Secchiaroli - lead vocals, guitar (2006–present)
- Jeffrey Jarvis - bass (2006–present)
- Rocco DellaNeve - piano, synthesizer, backing vocals (2016–present)
- Kendall Lantz - drums (2019–present)

=== Former members ===
- Steven Padin - drums, vocals (2006–2018)
- Danny Pizarro - piano (2010–2016)
- Michael Carroll - guitar, percussion (2006–2019)
- Geraldo Castillo - percussion, background vocals (2014–2019)
- Kelly Sciandra - piano, trumpet (2006–2019)
- John Baab - guitar (2014–2019)
- Darren Escar - saxophone (2010–2018)
- Rodney Flood - percussion, backing vocals (2019–2024)
- Amit Peled - guitar (2019–2024)

== Discography ==
=== Albums ===
- Rhythm, Chord & Melody (One Eleven, 2008)
- This Is What Happens (Candyrat, 2010)
- Play With Fire (Candyrat, 2013)
- Happy However After (Candyrat, 2018)

=== 8-Bit Albums ===
- This Is Also What Happens (Candyrat, 2010)
- Play (Candyrat, 2013)

=== EPs ===
- The Reign of Kindo EP (One Eleven, 2007)
- Christmas EP (Independent, 2010)
- Wither EP (Kindo Town Records, 2021)
- Songs from Christmas Past (Kindo Town Records, 2022)
