= Raw (Crack the Sky album) =

Studio album by Crack the Sky
- Released: 1986
- Studio: BeaTarama
- Genre: Rock
- Length: 38:40
- Label: Grudge
- Producer: John Palumbo

Crack the Sky chronology
World in Motion 1 (1983)	Raw (1986)	From the Greenhouse (1989)

Professional ratings
Review scores
Source	Rating
Allmusic	2/5 stars
Kerrang!	5/5 stars

Raw is the seventh studio album by American band Crack the Sky. Other than Jamie LaRitz on lead guitar, however, John Palumbo played all of the musical parts. The next Crack the Sky album, 1989's From the Greenhouse, saw the return of a number of veteran CTS members, most importantly guitarist Rick Witkowski.

== Track listing ==
All tracks are written by John Palumbo.

No.	Title	Length
1.	"White Girl on Fire"	5:46
2.	"Boilermaker"	4:35
3.	"Song for Another Year"	5:10
4.	"Elvis Was My Daddy!"	3:53
5.	"Crime"	6:32
6.	"Raw"	4:13
7.	"(This Is) The Real Thing"	4:23
8.	"The Samaritian" (Dedicated to Mitch Snyder)	4:08

== Personnel ==
- John Palumbo – guitar, bass guitar, vocals, drums, producer
- Jamie LaRitz – lead guitar, EFX
- David Heckscher – Elvis voice
- Connell Byrne – cover
