= Nodes of Ranvier (band) =

American metalcore band

- Origin: Sioux Falls, South Dakota, U.S.
- Genres: Metalcore, Christian metal
- Years active: 2000–2008, 2017-present
- Labels: Facedown Records; Victory Records
- Past members: Kyle Benecke; Jake Stefek; Brian Anderson; Jon Parker; Brady Murphy; Josh Ferrie; Jon Schuld; Terry Taylor; Ryan Knutson; Zachary "Add" Poppinga; Nick Thomas; Jeremy Schwartz; Thomas Hentges; Nick Murphy

Nodes of Ranvier is an American metalcore band from Sioux Falls, South Dakota that was signed to Victory Records. The band is described as "one of Sioux Falls' most successful and popular acts ever." They have played with bands including Bleeding Through, Every Time I Die, Bury Your Dead, Caliban, Comeback Kid, Norma Jean, Misery Signals, Extol and more across the U.S. The band's name refers to the myelin sheath gaps of the nervous system, which are also called nodes of Ranvier.

== History ==
Nodes of Ranvier was formed in September 2000 and 18 members including Nick Thomas, the singer from the Sioux Falls band The Spill Canvas; as well as Brian Anderson, lead singer and guitarist from the band All About Sam have been part of the band. By December 2007, when the band broke up, the only remaining original member was guitarist Jon Parker. The band released its first three albums through record label Facedown Records. In February 2007, they signed with Victory Records. Although Nodes of Ranvier's signing with Victory was touted as being a turning point, their July 2007 release, Defined by Struggle, revealed strains between the band and Victory, who reportedly did not do much to promote them. In mid-December 2007, news sources confirmed that Nodes of Ranvier would perform its last show in the same month and then disband.

Guitarist Jon Parker, one of the band's founding members, confirmed the announcement to media outlets, ending weeks of fan speculation. Shortly after beginning the disbandment, bassist Brady Murphy had both of his arms amputated after suffering severe burns in an electrical accident. On January 24, 2017, it was announced by Facedown Records that the band would reunite for Facedown Fest 2017, the 20th anniversary of the label, with new members Scott McGuire (bass) and Sheldon Swan (guitar).

== Members ==
Current

- Jon Parker - guitars (2000-2008, 2017–present)
- Ryan Knutson - drums (2000-2006, 2017–present)
- Kyle Benecke - vocals (2006-2008, 2017–present)
- Scott McGuire - bass guitar (2017–present)
- Sheldon Swan - guitar (2017–present)

Former

- Jeremy Schwartz - bass guitar (2000-2001)
- Zachary "Add" Poppinga - guitars (2000-2003)
- Thomas Hentges - vocals (2000-2005) (Burlap The Wolf King)
- Jon Schuld - bass guitar (2001-2004)
- Nick Thomas - guitars, vocals (2003-2005) (The Spill Canvas)
- Nick Murphy - vocals (2005-2006), bass guitar (2004-2005) (Tennessee Murder Club)
- Jake Stefek - guitars (2004-2008)
- Terry Taylor - bass guitar (2005-2006) (Hammerlord, ex-The Blinding Light, ex-Suffer, ex-Caligari, ex-The Last Tyrant)
- Brady Murphy - bass guitar (ex-After the Sun) (2006-2008)
- Josh Ferrie - drums (2006-2008) (Suffer, Tennessee Murder Club, ex-Fall, ex-The Blinding Light, ex-The Thirty Fathom Grave)

Timeline

== Discography ==
Studio albums

- Lost Senses, More Innocence (2002)
- Nodes of Ranvier (2003)
- The Years to Come (2005)
- Defined by Struggle (2007)

EPs

- Beauty with No Words (2001; Demo)
- Innocence Broken/Nodes of Ranvier (2002; Split EP w/ Innocence Broken)
