= Love Won the Fight =

Studio album by B.E. Taylor Group
- Released: January 1, 1983
- Genre: Pop rock
- Label: MCA
- Producer: Joe Macre, Rick Witkowski

B.E. Taylor Group chronology
Innermission (1982)	Love Won the Fight (1983)	Life Goes On EP (1984)

Love Won the Fight was the second album by pop rock band B.E. Taylor Group. It was released on New Year's Day, 1983.

The album spawned the charting single, "Vitamin L".

Released in 1983 as MCA-39007

== Track listing ==
1. Love Won the Fight - 4:47 (Joe Macre / Rick Witkowski)
2. Just a Beat Away - 4:33 (B.E. Taylor)
3. Break Down the Night - 4:39 (Joe Macre / Rick Witkowski)
4. Lonely at the Bottom - 4:23 (Joe Macre)
5. Vitamin L - 5:29 (Rick Witkowski / D. Witkowski)
6. That Kind of Love Don't Last - 3:56 (Joe Macre / B.E. Taylor / Rick Witkowski)
7. Should Have Called It Love - 4:05 (Rick Witkowski)
8. Hold on to Love - 3:42 (Joe Macre)
9. Break the Ice - 4:25 (Joe Macre)

Produced by Joe Macre and Rick Witkowski for BMO. Executive Producer - Carl Maruri
