= The Goodnight Moon =

Studio album by Rookie of the Year
- Released: April 11, 2006
- Recorded: 2005
- Genre: Emo acoustic Indie rock
- Length: 48:39
- Label: One Eleven Records
- Producer: Ed Rose, Matthew Malpass

Rookie of the Year chronology
Having to Let Go (2005)	The Goodnight Moon (2006)	Sweet Attention (2008)

Singles from The Goodnight Moon
- 1. "Liars and Battlelines" Released: August 18, 2008 (radio)

Professional ratings
Review scores
Source	Rating
Allmusic	3.0/5 stars

The Goodnight Moon is the second studio album by the American indie rock band Rookie of the Year, released by One Eleven Records on April 11, 2006. It was Rookie of the Year's first release as a full band, after originally being formed as an acoustic solo project of lead vocalist Ryan Dunson.

The first single from the album was "Liars and Battlelines". According to Ryan Dunson in a lyric feature on Euphonia Online, "This song is about loving someone even though they have lied to you before. It is about looking over the fact that someone lies in the relationship. A relationship like that can only go on for so long, then its time to pack up and leave."

AbsolutePunk.net's Rohan Kohli stated on the music website, "I instantly fell in love with the gorgeous vocals, lush, soaring choruses, smooth, harmonic guitar leads, and the heaps upon heaps of layers and accents." In support of the album, the band took part in the 2006 Warped Tour.

== Track listing ==
1. "The Goodnight Moon" – 2:09
2. "Poison Like Your Own" – 4:36
3. "Silhouettes (All Eyes Above)" – 3:15
4. "Sign of Her Glory" – 4:56
5. "Liars and Battlelines" – 4:20
6. "Pop Destroyed the Scene" – 3:48
7. "The Blue Roses" – 3:51
8. "Life, Fall Fast Now" – 2:02
9. "Set the Sails, Red Beret" – 4:03
10. "The Weekend" – 4:20
11. "Enjoy This Drive" – 3:46
12. "Having to Let Go" – 7:33
