= Dropout Year =

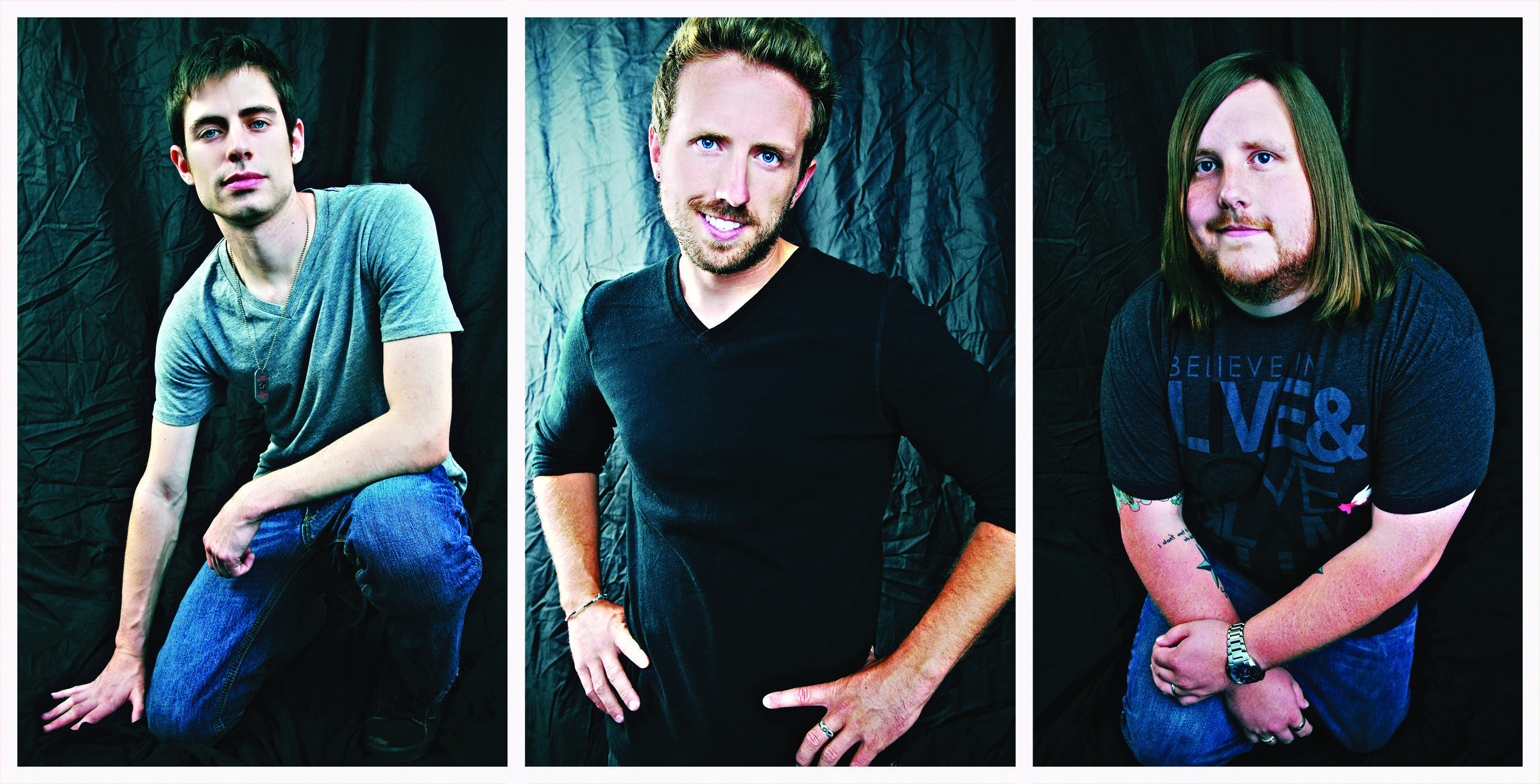
- Dropout Year; Adam Goodman, Steve Reter, Brandon Reter

Background information
- Origin: Owings Mills, Maryland
- Genres: Pop punk, Pop rock
- Years active: 2004–present
- Members: Steve Reter (vocals); Brandon Reter (guitar); Adam Goodman (guitar)
- Past members: Adam Henderson (bass guitar, vocals); Justin Childers (drums); Jordan Young (drums); Dan Ciarrocchi (bass guitar, backing vocals)
- Website: http://www.myspace.com/dropoutyear

Dropout Year is an American pop punk band from Baltimore, Maryland, formed in June 2004. The band consists of lead vocalist Steve Reter and guitarists Brandon Reter and Adam Goodman.

Dropout Year started out in June 2004, when ex-singer Adam Henderson, Brandon Reter, and ex-drummer Justin Childers (playing as a 3-piece originally known as Far From Home) asked Adam Goodman (a high school friend) to join the band after he witnessed them perform a concert at the Recher Theatre in Towson, Maryland. The band, with manager (and future singer) Steve Reter, completed and released two demo CD's over the next two years. Their first studio EP was titled Seven Unreturned Phone Calls (an ode to the film "Say Anything") and released on July 18, 2006. The EP was recorded with Paul Leavitt (All Time Low, Over It) and the sold-out CD release party was held at the Recher Theatre on August 4, 2006.

In the summer of 2007, they parted ways with original drummer, Justin Childers. Jordan Young was asked to audition after submitting a YouTube of him drumming to selection of the band's songs, and was officially chosen a few weeks later. Later that year, they won national exposure by being selected as a Taco Bell Feed The Beat winner, along with A Day To Remember, Blameshift, and Mayday Parade. Two months later, they were featured as an AP&R band in the October 2007 issue of Alternative Press Magazine, as well being named a HomeTown Hero band. From the article: "Everything they touch is currently turning to harmonic gold. They won DJ Rossstar's first national unsigned band contest and this year's Comcast On Demand Music Video Contest and were featured as one of the top unsigned bands in the country by TheDailyChorus.com."

In January 2008, they parted ways with their singer Adam Henderson. It was soon after announced that long-time manager and co-songwriter Steve Reter would be the new lead singer. After re-recording some of their more popular songs for an acoustic EP, the band started writing for their 3rd studio EP. In July 2008, Dan Ciarrocchi would be added on bass (formerly of Bravo Romeo Bravo). In October, they spent two weeks in the studio recording their forthcoming album with producer and ex-Hidden In Plain View member Rob Freeman. The album, titled The Way We Play, was released on April 7, 2009.

Dropout Year has recently won the Ernie Ball contest, playing the Vans Warped Tour 2009. They also won the contest in 2007 and were featured that year on the Warped Tour. The band continued to tour throughout the summer of 2009, including a Hot Topic-sponsored Mall Tour through the Northeast states.

In the fall of 2009, it was announced that drummer Jordan Young had parted ways with the band to join NC band Rookie of the Year. Shortly after it was released bassist Dan Ciarrocchi would no longer be in the band for amicable reasons.

Steve, Brandon and Adam recorded a free holiday album with former drummer Justin Childers in the winter of 2009, called The Seven Levels of the Candy Cane Forest. The EP was posted for free download on December 22, 2009. The band was selected to play Vans Warped Tour 2010. They had their song's "Pretty You" featured on MTV's Teen Mom 2 season finale and "Change Today" featured in the commercial for MTV's new season of I Used To Be Fat in 2011.

== Discography ==
- Daily Confessions EP (2004)
- You Say When (2005)
- Seven Unreturned Phone Calls (2006)
- Best Friends for Never (2007)
- On a Lighter Note (2008)
- Red Sweaters With Snowflakes On Them (Free Christmas EP) (2008)
- The Way We Play (2009)
- The Seven Levels of the Candy Cane Forest (Free Christmas EP) (2009)

== Reviews ==
- "Dropout Year has stunned me. What has been sent my way is the most promising EP I have heard in some time. Best Friends For Never features eight songs of hook-filled, catchy and perfectly paced pop-punk tunes. I will not soon forget these tunes, which is usually a problem for me. Pop-punk lives or dies in it's [sic] choruses, and Best Friends For Never features one irresistible hook after another." –Blake Solomon, ABSOLUTEPUNK.NET
- "Dropout Year fails to hold anything back. Every track off of this new EP is singularly unique, each with a very defining sound, none sounding like the next." –Andrea Hubbell, DRIVENFAROFF.COM
