= Cut (Crack the Sky album) =

Studio album by Crack the Sky
- Released: 1998
- Genre: Rock
- Label: Stepford Wives

Crack the Sky chronology
Dog City (1990)	Cut (1998)	Ghost (2001)

Cut is the tenth studio album by Crack the Sky, released in 1998.

== Track listing ==
All tracks are written by John Palumbo, except where noted.

No.	Title	Length
1.	"Why Me?"	4:48
2.	"Cut (The Sequel)"	5:08
3.	"Oh Madonna"	5:52
4.	"God"	4:19
5.	"Eye to Eye"	4:25
6.	"The Art of Wondering" (Palumbo, John Tracey, Ron Zebron)	5:10
7.	"We Want Mine (Still)"	4:33
8.	"Hey Earl" (Palumbo, Tracey, Zebron)	3:39
9.	"I'm Gonna Kill Myself"	3:19
10.	"Little Stinky"	1:22

== Personnel ==
=== Crack the Sky ===
- John Palumbo — Vocals, guitar, keyboards
- John Tracey — Drums, backing vocals
- Cary Ziegler — Bass guitar
- Bobby Hird — Guitar, backing vocals
- Rick Witkowski — Guitar
- Ron Zebron — Guitar
