= This Day and Age =

Former band from Tonawanda, New York

- This Day and Age at the Masquerade in Atlanta, September 16, 2005

Background information
- Origin: Buffalo, New York, United States
- Genres: Indie rock, emo, emo pop
- Years active: 2001–2006
- Label: One Eleven Records
- Members: Jeff Martin; Joseph Secchiaroli; Steven Padin; Kelly Sciandra; Michael Carroll
- Past members: Kenneth Campbell; Peter Arcara
- Website: www.thisdayandagemusic.com/

This Day and Age was a band from Tonawanda, a suburb of Buffalo, New York, signed to One Eleven Records.

== History ==
This Day and Age formed in 2001, and released their debut full-length, Start Over on Monday, in 2002. They signed to One Eleven Records later in 2002. Their debut album, Always Leave the Ground, was released on the label in 2004. The release of the album was followed by tours with Mae and The Spill Canvas, as well as appearances on Warped Tour. Soon after this, bassist Kenneth Campbell left the group and was replaced by Joey Secchiaroli. Shortly after the release of their 2006 album The Bell and the Hammer, it was announced that the band would be on hiatus as Jeff Martin went on to teach at a school called Renaissance Academy. In late 2006, the remaining four members of the band announced that they would regroup in a new musical pursuit, now known as The Reign of Kindo.

Martin has since become a member of a new band, Pompton Lakes. Their debut album, Rest, was released on iTunes and Amazon radio on October 30, 2012, with a video for the single, "Home," also released.

== Members ==
=== Final members ===
- Jeff Martin – vocals and guitar
- Joseph Secchiaroli – bass and vocals
- Steven Padin – drums
- Kelly Sciandra – piano
- Michael Carroll – guitar

=== Former members ===
- Kenneth Campbell – bass (2003–2005)
- Peter Arcara – bass (2001–2003; 2005)

== Discography ==
=== Albums ===
Title	Release date	Label
Start Over On Monday	2002	Refining the Dynamic
Always Leave the Ground	September 7, 2004	One Eleven Records
The Bell and the Hammer	August 22, 2006	One Eleven Records
