= Start Over on Monday =

Start Over On Monday

Studio album by This Day & Age
- Released: Summer 2002
- Genre: Indie rock

This Day & Age chronology
| Start Over On Monday (2002) | Always Leave the Ground (2004) |

Professional ratings
Review scores
| Source | Rating |
|---|---|
| EmotionalPunk.com | link |

Start Over On Monday is the debut album by Buffalo-based band This Day & Age, released in summer 2002.

== Track listing ==
1. Wallis (Trying Not to Try) - 3:13
2. A Witness to Your Fading Integrity - 5:24
3. The Struggle - 4:36
4. All That Can Change - 3:17
5. Looking for Answers - 3:49
6. Sunset - 4:04
7. Three Weeks from Now - 4:08
8. The Best Goodbye - 4:14
9. When Summer's Gone - 3:45
10. Learning to Forget - 11:23
