= From the Greenhouse =

Studio album by Crack the Sky
- Released: 1989
- Genre: Rock
- Length: 42:15
- Label: Grudge
- Producer: John Palumbo

Crack the Sky chronology
Raw (1986)	From the Greenhouse (1989)	Dog City (1990)

From the Greenhouse is a studio album by the American band Crack the Sky, released in 1989. It saw the return of keyboardist Vince DePaul as well as founding members Rick Witkowski (lead guitar) and drummer Joe D'Amico (relegated to just singing back-up vocals). A concept album about environmental degradation, it originated as a John Palumbo solo album.

Professional ratings
Review scores
Source	Rating
AllMusic	2/5 stars
Ottawa Citizen	2/5 stars

The Ottawa Citizen wrote that "Crack the Sky only relaxes its borrowing from Pink Floyd long enough to copy a few hooks and harmonies from the Beatles." The Buffalo News called the album a "snappy, sleekly-produced set with its echoes of Pink Floyd's Roger Waters and, occasionally, Peter Gabriel."

== Track listing ==
All tracks are written by John Palumbo.

No.	Title	Length
1.	"From the Greenhouse"	5:51
2.	"Under Red Skies"	3:28
3.	"Big Money"	5:44
4.	"The Frozen Rain"	5:44
5.	"Monkeyboy"	3:44
6.	"All the Things We Do"	5:05
7.	"Lost in America"	4:41
8.	"Can I Play for You (Ian's Song)"	7:58

Note: song lengths listed on the CD differ slightly from the tracks' actual times

== Personnel ==
Crack the Sky

- John Palumbo — Vocals, guitar, bass guitar, drums
- Rick Witkowski — Lead guitar
- Vince DePaul — Keyboards
- Joe D'Amico — Backing vocals

Additional musicians

- Dave Carrero — Guitar solo ("Lost in America")
- Paul Soroka — Lyricon solos, brass
- Marvin Brown — Backing vocals
- Terry Brown — Backing vocals
- Louis Roscar — Brass
- Otis Demteen — Brass

Production

- John Palumbo — Producer
- Bob Ludwig — Mastering
- Steve Palmieri — Engineer
- Victor Giordano — Editing
- Donald Stewart — Tape machines

Additional credits

- Ross Anzalone Adcreations — Cover concept and design
- Mastered at Masterdisk
- Recorded and mixed at The Mainframe
