= The Sale (album) =

2007 concept album by Crack the Sky

Studio album by Crack the Sky
- Released: 2007
- Genre: Rock
- Length: 54:00
- Label: Aluminum Cat Recordings

Crack the Sky chronology
Dogs from Japan (2004)	The Sale (2007)	Machine (2010)

The Sale is a concept album by the American rock band Crack the Sky. The album was released on November 23, 2007 by Aluminum Cat Recordings and was their thirteenth studio album.

It was described in The Beaver County Times as a "politically charged comeback album".

== Track listing ==
No.	Title	Length
1.	"The Sale: Introduction"	2:38
2.	"Prelude"	1:23
3.	"American Refugee"	3:00
4.	"American Refugee - Movement 2"	2:42
5.	"The Voice of Revolution"	2:28
6.	"The Voice of Revolution - Movement 2"	3:27
7.	"A Letter Home"	4:00
8.	"Immigration"	4:28
9.	"Immigration - Movement 2"	3:23
10.	"A Prayer for the Children"	5:53
11.	"The Voice of Corporation"	4:06
12.	"L'Acte de Patriote"	8:54
13.	"The Kingdom Grows"	5:01
14.	"The Face of God"	4:46
15.	"The Sale: Closin' Time"	6:45

== Personnel ==
=== Crack the Sky ===
- John Palumbo – vocals, guitar
- Rick Witkowski – guitar, vocals
- Dougie Bryan – background vocals
- Bobby Hird – guitar, vocals
- Joe Macre – bass, vocals
- John Tracey – drums
- Glen Workman – keyboards

=== Other ===
- Dan Stover – photography
- Doug Milton – mastering
