= Infinite Carcass =

Studio album by Girlfight
- Released: October 16, 2010
- Studio: Headbanging Kill Your Mama Music (Louisville, Kentucky)
- Genres: Post-hardcore; hardcore punk; mathcore
- Length: 12:02
- Label: Emerald Moon

Girlfight chronology
Ghost Eater (2010)	Infinite Carcass (2010)	Defamate (2011)

Infinite Carcass is the debut studio album by American hardcore punk band Girlfight. It was released on October 16, 2010, via indie record label Emerald Moon Records.

== Background and recording ==
After the release of Ghost Eater, the band met with Chris Owen (Breather Resist, Coliseum, Ed Gein) to help make the band's debut studio album. Infinite Carcass was intended to be a full-length, and then accidentally wasn't due to the songs being short. "We'd be like, 'This song is done... sh*t, it's only a minute long,'" recalls Watt. Vocalist Dave Watt points the band's direction towards its predecessors, like Every Time I Die and Gallows.

Infinite Carcass was the first project that the band has felt was serious "For a week our whole lives were this record. Usually you're recording with some dudes in Pittsburgh over five weekends. "All we did was record, play hacky sack and eat noodles."

The album was recorded and mixed by Chris Owens at Headbanging Kill Your Mama Music, mastered by Bill Henderson at Azimuth Mastering. The artwork was made by Dave Watt, Bradon Volkman, and Bats For Supper designs. The band made a CD release show at Hot Metal Bridge Church, on October 16, 2010.

A music video was made for the track "Doom Route" on March 14, 2011, it was filmed by Death Perception Pictures.

== Reception ==
Professional ratings
Review scores
Source	Rating
The Purdue University Calumet Chronicles	7/10
RockFreaks	6.5/10
The Pittsburgh Scene	Positive
Pittsburgh City Paper	Positive

The album received mixed to positive reviews outlets.

PUC Chronicles had an overwhelming positive stance on the album saying "This album, though, packs quite a punch and with a lot of substance. Songs like “Doom Route” and “Sick Day” seem to epitomize the band and their ability to intertwine angular, off-time parts with standard metered, traditional hardcore. This album can definitely serve as an “introduction to hardcore-punk music.”

The Pittsburgh Scene was also positive "All of the songs flow perfectly, leaving the listener with absolutely no downtime to recuperate and prepare for the next track. Girlfight provides an arsenal of their signature blistering-speed short songs, with the longest track coming in just under two minutes."

RockFreaks was mixed "The record is too short and the songs similarly chaotic to each other for me to come up with much more in this review, but just check the for the fans of section and make a decision to check these guys out."

The Pittsburgh City Paper was pleased with the effort "The sense of compression is palpable. Like some airborne toxin, it doesn't take extended exposure to Infinite Carcass to contract the rousing anxiety it radiates."

== Track listing ==
All tracks are written by Girlfight.

No.	Title	Length
1.	"Doom Route" (Additional vocals by Chris Owens)	1:38
2.	"Sick Day"	1:37
3.	"Vice Precedence"	0:54
4.	"Feeble Crown"	1:11
5.	"Halcyon"	0:55
6.	"Seven Cycles"	1:49
7.	"Milk Brain"	0:50
8.	"Mange Event"	0:54
9.	"Executive Death"	1:06
10.	"Shitty Lazarus"	1:04
Total length:		12:02

== Personnel ==
Girlfight

- Dave Watt – vocals
- Jordan Bellotti – guitar
- Richie Lattanzi – bass
- Brandon Volkman – drums

Technical personnel

- Chris Owens – recording, mixing, and additional vocals in "Doom Route."
- Bill Henderson – mastering
- Dave Watt, Bradon Volkman, and Bats For Supper designs – artwork
