= Try Love =

1997 album by B. E. Taylor

Studio album by B. E. Taylor
- Released: 1997
- Genre: Pop rock
- Label: Chrishae
- Producer: B. E. Taylor

B. E. Taylor chronology
B. E. Taylor Christmas (1994)	Try Love (1997)	B. E. Taylor Christmas 2 (2000)

Try Love is the second album by solo artist B. E. Taylor. It was released in 1997. The album features a remake of a song B.E. made while in the B. E. Taylor Group. The album contains the most original material of any of B.E's solo work, as almost all of his other albums consist of renditions of classic songs based around a central theme.

The album spawned charting singles "This Time" and "Love You All Over Again".

== Track listing ==
1. "This Time"
2. "Be There"
3. "Love You All Over Again"
4. "You Gotta Learn to Love"
5. "Without Love"
6. "Vitamin L"
7. "Try Love"
8. "Big Enough"
9. "Never Hold Back"
10. "My Heart Remembers"
11. "You're Gonna Work It Out"
12. "Loving"

== Personnel ==
- B. E. Taylor – vocals, producer, arranger, mixer
- Rick Witkowski – Guitars, percussion (tracks 2, 7, 11 and 12), backgrounds vocals (all tracks except 1–3, 9, 10 and 12), producer, arranger, mixer
- Jamie Peck – Organ (tracks 1, 6 and 11), saxophone (tracks 2, 5 and 6), keyboard (track 2), piano (tracks 4 and 7), horns (track 8), strings (tracks 12)
- Nat Kerr – piano (tracks 5, 11 and 12), strings (tracks 3 and 12), clavinet (track 8), keyboards (track 10)
- Tom Bellin – Bass (all tracks except 3, 10 and 12)
- Rick Dickerson – drums (all tracks except 3, 7, 11 and 12), percussions (track 10)
- Hermie Granati – Backgrounds vocals (tracks 9 and 10), piano (track 9)
- Steve Graham – Horns (tracks 5 and 6)
- Fred Lewis – Horns (tracks 5 and 6)
- Pete Loria – Horns (tracks 5 and 6)
- Dan Roache – Bass (track 10)
- Denise Graves – Background vocals (tracks 4, 8, and 10)
- Toni Turner – Backgrounds vocals (tracks 4, 8 and 10)
- Jennifer Lee – Background vocals (tracks 4 and 8)
- Steve Schuffert – Slide guitar (track 10)
- Joy Wilson – Background vocals (track 5)
- Deb Witkowski – Background vocals (track 6)
- Veronica Taylor – Background vocals (track 6)
- B.C. Taylor – Background vocals (track 6)
- Tahnee Taylor – Background vocals (track 6)
- Gina DeBlasis – Backgrounds vocals (track 6)
- Danielle Riddle – Backgrounds vocals (track 6)
- D.J. Riddle – Backgrounds vocals (track 6)
- Craig Maloney – Backgrounds vocals (track 6)
- Tim Fair – Bouzouki (track 2)
