= Ostrich (album) =

Studio album by Crack the Sky
- Released: October 23, 2012
- Genre: Rock
- Label: Aluminum Cat Recordings

Crack the Sky chronology
Machine (2010)	Ostrich (2012)

Professional ratings
Review scores
Source	Rating
Los Angeles Times	1/4 stars

Ostrich is the fifteenth studio album by the American rock band Crack the Sky, released in 2012.

== Track listing ==
All tracks were composed by John Palumbo and performed by Crack the Sky.

1	The Box	4:24
2	Happy Happy Happy	4:45
3	Your House is on Fire	4:30
4	King of the Rodeo	4:30
5	Big Elephant	5:10
6	Holding My Breath	4:44
7	Pole Dancing at the Hollywood	4:52
8	Under the Hood	4:21
9	Don't Ask	4:02
10	Ali's Song	3:11

== The band ==
- John Palumbo (Vocals/Guitar/Keyboards)
- Bobby Hird (Vocals/Guitar)
- Dave DeMarco (Vocals/Bass/Baritone guitar)
- Rick Witkowski (Vocals/Guitar/Ukulele)
- Glenn Workman (Vocals/Keyboards)
- Joey D'Amico (Vocals/Drums)
