= Inkwell (band) =

American indie rock band

- Origin: Winter Park, Florida
- Genres: Indie rock; power pop
- Years active: 2005–2009
- Labels: Amateur Records, One Eleven Records
- Past members: Travis Adams; Davey Pierce

Inkwell was an indie rock band from Winter Park, Florida. They released three full-length albums and one EP, as well as a collaboration with former techno artist Floorboard. The band consisted of Travis Adams, the former frontman of My Hotel Year, Davey Pierce, who was then the bassist of indie pop band of Montreal, and Matt Malpass, who went on to produce albums for Blink 182, Machine Gun Kelly and Lil Nas X (earning him a Grammy nomination).

== History ==
=== Chaos Reveals Rhyme and breakthrough (2005–2007) ===
The band's debut album, Chaos Reveals Rhyme was released June 7, 2005 through Amateur Records. The band was signed by One Eleven Records, a small Orlando label that was part of East West Records, distributing their album These Stars are Monsters on June 25, 2006. The band's song "Ecuador is Lovely This Time of Year" was included in the soundtrack of EA Sports video game NHL 07, propelling the band to new attention.

The album was well received in the alternative rock and punk scene. Hybrid magazine and Emotional Punk both praised the album. Punknews.org was less receptive.

=== Hiatus (2008) ===
Due to Davey Pierce's commitments with of Montreal the band took a hiatus. Travis Adams did a My Hotel Year reunion tour.

Exactly one year after the release of These Stars are Monsters, the band posted an update on their Myspace page. The band invited fans to help create clever song titles. One element of the band's style was that none of the song titles reflected the actual lyrics. The band announced several summer shows.

=== Flotsam and Rivers of Blood and Sadness, or Maybe Happy (2009) ===
On December 30, 2008, Inkwell released an EP titled Flotsam. It was a collection of cast-off songs and a couple pieces of new material from the upcoming album. The first two songs appear on the latest album and are identical in production. The next three songs were songs that did not make the final cut from their three studio albums. One cut from each album was included, as well as a remix of a Chaos Reveals Rhyme. The EP received positive reviews.

Inkwell released their third full-length album on April 21, 2009, Rivers of Blood and Sadness, or Maybe Happy. The album was made available via iTunes Music Store. The album received positive reviews from iTunes users. It was however negatively criticized by TheLoud.com, citing that the album simply offered more of the same, and lacked the creativity of the group's previous two full-length albums.

== Members ==
- Travis Adams
- Davey Pierce

== Discography ==
=== Studio albums ===
- Chaos Reveals Rhyme - June 7, 2005
- These Stars are Monsters - June 25, 2006
- Rivers of Blood and Sadness, or Maybe Happy - April 21, 2009

=== EPs ===
"Flotsam EP" - December 30, 2008
