= Machine (Crack the Sky album) =

Studio album by Crack the Sky
- Released: 2010
- Genre: Rock

Crack the Sky chronology
The Sale (2007)	Machine (2010)	Ostrich (2012)

Machine is 14th studio album by the American rock band Crack the Sky, released on February 9, 2010.

It was described by Evan Haga of The Baltimore Sun as "ambitious" and "darkly political".

== Track listing ==
No.	Title	Length
1.	"Prelude"
2.	"Heaven"
3.	"Come Out"
4.	"Here It Comes Again"
5.	"Goodbye Mrs. Nature"
6.	"Join Up"
7.	"Hyphen-American"
8.	"Go Johnny"
9.	"Hero"
10.	"We're All Dead"

== Personnel ==
- John Palumbo – vocals, guitar, keyboards)
- Bobby Hird – vocals, guitar, mandolin
- Joe Macre – bass synthesizer, bass guitar
- Rick Witkowski – vocals, guitar
- Glenn Workman – vocals, keyboards
- Joey D'Amico – vocals, drums
- Anthony Rankin – drums (9)
