= Defined by Struggle =

Studio album by Nodes of Ranvier
- Released: July 24, 2007
- Genre: Metalcore
- Label: Victory

Nodes of Ranvier chronology
The Years to Come (2005)	Defined by Struggle (2007)

Professional ratings
Review scores
Source	Rating
Blabbermouth.net	8.5/10
Jesus Freak Hideout	3.5/5 stars

Defined by Struggle is an album by the metalcore band Nodes of Ranvier, released in 2007. It was the band's final album.

The album was the band's first to be released by Victory Records. The album art was created by the artist Dennis Sibeijn.

== Critical reception ==
Exclaim! wrote that "the breakdowns pummel, the hardcore is heavy, the metallic overtones are there ... But it's time for a new sound."

== Track listing ==
1. "Sermon"
2. "Valjean"
3. "Endless Faith"
4. "Purpose in Pain"
5. "Wrathbearer"
6. "Defined by Struggle"
7. "Archegos"
8. "Sergeant Sorrow"
9. "Nagheenanajar"
10. "Confront"
11. "Infidelity"

== Personnel ==
- Josh Ferrie – drums
- Kyle Benecke – vocals
- Jake Stefek – guitar
- Jon Parker – guitar
- Brady Murphy – bass guitar
