= B. E. Taylor =

- Also known as: Billy Eddie, B.E.
- Born: William Edward Taylor; March 18, 1951; Aliquippa, Pennsylvania, U.S.
- Died: August 7, 2016 (aged 65) Wheeling, West Virginia, U.S.
- Genres: Pop rock; Christian rock; AOR
- Occupations: Singer-songwriter, musician
- Instruments: Acoustic guitar, vocals
- Years active: 1970–2016
- Labels: MCA, Epic, First String Records (B. E. Taylor Group); Chrishae Records
- Formerly of: B. E. Taylor Group
- Website: http://www.betaylor.com

William Edward "B. E." Taylor (March 18, 1951 – August 7, 2016) was the lead singer of the pop rock band B. E. Taylor Group and a solo artist. The group's 1983 single, "Vitamin L", reached No. 66 on the Billboard 100 singles chart.

== Life and career ==
Hailing from Aliquippa, Pennsylvania, he was the eldest of three sons of Bill and Betty Taylor. Born William Edward, he was called 'Billy Eddie' by his mother, which he eventually shortened to B. E. While in high school, he formed B.E. Taylor and The Establishment.

In the 1970s he fronted a number of bands and performed at clubs and venues in the Tri-state of Pennsylvania; Ohio and West Virginia. For a short time in the mid 1970s he paired with Donnie Iris as Iris/Taylor, between Donnie's time with the Jaggerz; Wild Cherry and Donnie Iris and the Cruisers. Recordings exist of the duos work yet have never been released. Donnie produced Taylor's first MCA album in 1981 titled INNERMISSION.

Bill also toured with the band Q who had a national hit "Dancin' Man" in 1977 on Epic. The actual lead vocalist on the recording didn't want to tour.

Taylor also replaced the lead singer, Ronnie Lee Cunningham of Ohio based band THE LAW on tour, who scored a regional hit titled "Wake Up" in 1975.

In 1977, after John Palumbo took a one album hiatus from progressive rock band CRACK THE SKY, B.E. Taylor recorded the lead vocals on five of the tracks for the SAFETY IN NUMBERS album. After a review of the contract with his entertainment lawyer, he was advised not to do the deal and another vocalist, Gary Lee Chappelle was hired. The Taylor tracks do exist in the archives.

In the early 1980s, Taylor joined with three former members of the progressive rock band Crack the Sky - Rick Witkowski (guitar), Joe Macre (bass), and Joey D'Amico (drums) - along with keyboardist Nat Kerr to form the B.E. Taylor Group. The group generated some noise during the first half of the 1980s, particularly in 1984, when they scored MTV video rotation and a Billboard regional No. 1 hit with the song "Vitamin L."

"Love Won the Fight" and "Beat Away" were also released as singles and fared well from Wheeling to Cleveland and, of course, Pittsburgh.

From INNERMISSION, the track "Never Hold Back" reached #47 on the Radio and Records Mainstream Rock chart.

The third major label album was released through CBS Associated/Epic. A self produced EP had been released regionally in 1985 featuring Karen; Dangerous Rhythm and Reggae Rock and Roll. "Karen" was a regional smash and Epic forced the band to issue it as first single from OUR WORLD in 1986. Unfortunately, the stations which had embraced the song a year earlier could only offer token play and reports in '86. Karen only managed to reach #97 on the Billboard Top 100. A second single, "Reggae Rock and Roll", placed inside the Top 100 in Cashbox and Bubbled Under at Billboard but the national breakthrough didn't materialize. The band had hoped Epic would release the title track or any one of several other candidates as singles but that didn't happen. A 12 inch of Dangerous Rhythm from the 1985 EP was serviced to clubs and Dance stations and did garner air play in Germany but it was too little too late.

In 1987 an executive at Epic suggested the band record a Dan Hartman composition with lyrics and themes contrary to Taylor's Christian values. Bill changed the lyrics and the band recorded a demo which was sent to the executive who did not receive it well. On July 4th, 1987, after playing in front of over ten thousand people at Pittsburgh's The Point for the holiday, the band received the news they had been dropped from the label.

Songs which had been demoed for OUR WORLD and an anticipated follow up album, would make it on the 1997 TRY LOVE album. Those songs included the title track; Without Love; My Heart Remembers; Loving and You've Got to Work It Out among others. Two new recordings, This Time and Love You All Over Again made it into the Top 30 at Adult Contemporary Radio Gavin chart with the latter being played on the nationally syndicated Delilah Love Song Show.

Taylor moved to Wheeling, West Virginia in the mid-1980s.

In 1991, Taylor, a dedicated Christian, contributed a reworking of “Silent Night” to a local radio station’s Christmas compilation, launching his second career as a holiday performer.

B.E. and Rick Witkowski would regularly tour with Contemporary Christian singer Kathy Troccolli between 1994 and 1997 with one of the highlights performing for The Pope and over 70,000 people in Washington D.C.

B.E. would lend his voice to the Rick Witkowski produced jingles and bumpers for Old Navy and Nick at Night/ Nickelodeon TV network and shows.

Taylor went on to record five solo albums and developed a following in the adult contemporary market with his annual Christmas tours. He had also performed for many popular television programs in the 1990s, including the award-winning LightMusic, for which he was the music director, Nickelodeon, and its night-time programming block, Nick At Nite.

In 2008, Taylor was awarded the Duquesne University Lifetime Achievement Award.

On September 10, 2021 B.E. Taylor was inducted into the Wheeling Hall of Fame in a ceremony, celebration and dinner at the WesBanco Arena in Wheeling, WV.

== Later years and death ==
In March 2007, Taylor was diagnosed with an inoperable brain tumor. During the years of treatment, he released the album B. E. Taylor Christmas 3 and a concert DVD, completed eight Christmas tours, and performed Valentines Day and summer concerts, as well.

He died on August 7, 2016, aged 65 from complications of the tumor. He was survived by his wife Veronica (née DeBlasis) Taylor and two children, B.C. and Tahnee.

== Discography ==
=== With B. E. Taylor Group ===
==== Albums ====
- Innermission (1982)
- Love Won the Fight (1983)
- Life Goes On EP (1984)
- Our World (1986)

==== Singles ====
- "Never Hold Back" (1982) - #54 Billboard Mainstream Rock Tracks
- "Love Won the Fight" (1983)
- "Just A Beat Away" (1983)
- "Vitamin L" (1984) - #66 Billboard Hot 100
- "Dangerous Rhythm" (1986)
- "Reggae Rock & Roll" (1986) - #102 Billboard Bubbling Under the Hot 100
- "Karen" (1986) - #94 Billboard Hot 100

=== As a solo artist ===
==== Albums ====
- B. E. Taylor Christmas (1994)
- Try Love (1997)
- B. E. Taylor Christmas 2 (2000)
- One Nation Under God (2004)
- Love Never Fails (2006)
- B. E. Taylor Christmas 3 (2012)

==== Singles ====
- "This Time" (1997) - #29 Gavin Adult Contemporary
- "Love You All Over Again" (1997) - #28 Gavin Adult Contemporary
- "Let There Be Peace On Earth" (2002)
