= Sweet Attention =

Studio album by Rookie of the Year
- Released: August 5, 2008
- Genre: Indie rock, pop rock, acoustic
- Length: 43:43
- Label: One Eleven
- Producer: Matt Malpass

Rookie of the Year chronology
The Goodnight Moon (2006)	Sweet Attention (2008)	Since I Left Your World (2009)

Professional ratings
Review scores
Source	Rating
AbsolutePunk.net	72% link
Alternative Press	2.5/5 stars

Sweet Attention is the third full-length studio album by American indie rock band Rookie of the Year. The follow-up to 2006's The Goodnight Moon was released on 5 August 2008. It is the band's fourth release and third studio album on label 111 Records. The album was produced by Matt Malpass. Prior to release of the album, Rookie of the Year posted "What is Love" and "Summer" up on their MySpace page.

An advance copy of the album leaked in June 2008, in response, the band released nine bonus unreleased tracks with the entire record which has been re-mixed and re-mastered.

== Track listing ==
1. "Feel Like New" – 3:31
2. "Asleep with You" – 3:13
3. "Falling from the Sky" – 3:30
4. "Summer" – 3:53
5. "What Is Love" – 3:51
6. "Sooner or Later (The Next Move)" – 4:15
7. "Any Longer" – 3:17
8. "Vampire Vegas" – 3:08
9. "My Ocean" – 3:44
10. "Danger Zone" – 3:30
11. "Sweet Attention" – 4:16
12. "Savannah" – 3:35

== Personnel ==
- Ryan Dunson – vocals
- Mike Kamerman – guitar, backing vocals
- Pat Murphy – bass guitar
- Brandon Schade – guitar
- Mick Parsons – drums
