= B. E. Taylor Christmas =

Studio album by B. E. Taylor
- Released: 1994
- Recorded: 1991, 1992, Spring 1994 at Studio L
- Genres: Christian rock, pop rock
- Length: 51:37
- Label: Chrishae
- Producers: B. E. Taylor, Rick Witkowski

B. E. Taylor chronology
B. E. Taylor Christmas (1994)	Try Love (1997)

B. E. Taylor Christmas is the debut solo album by B. E. Taylor. The album was released in 1994, and was the first in a two-album series of Christmas albums by B.E. A longtime Christian, B.E. made the album after the overwhelming response to his 1991 rework of "Silent Night", launching his reputation as a holiday performer.

== Track listing ==
1. "Joy to the World" - 5:11
2. "What Child Is This?" - 4:56
3. "We Three Kings" - 4:39
4. "O Come All Ye Faithful/Emanuel" - 4:11
5. "Mary's Boy Child" - 3:58
6. "Little Drummer Boy" - 3:56
7. "O Holy Night" - 4:32
8. "O Little Town of Bethlehem" - 4:06
9. "Angels We Have Heard On High" - 5:52
10. "Midnight Clear" - 3:39
11. "God Rest Ye Merry Gentlemen" - 4:21
12. "Silent Night" - 4:16
