= Girlfight (band) =

American hardcore punk band

- Origin: Pittsburgh, Pennsylvania, U.S.
- Genres: Post-hardcore; hardcore punk; mathcore
- Years active: 2008–2013
- Labels: Emerald Moon; Mayfly
- Past members: Gregg Harrington; Tony Heubel; Laura Marks; Lenny Hotkowski; Nick Leombruno; Dave Watt; Jordan Bellotti; Richie Lattanzi; Brandon Volkman

Girlfight was an American hardcore punk band formed in Pittsburgh, Pennsylvania, April 2008. The group consisted of vocalist Dave Watt, guitarist Jordan Bellotti, bassist Richie Lattanzi, and drummer Brandon Volkman.

After the band's creation, they signed onto Emerald Moon Records and released their debut EP Haggard (2008). Two years later they released their second EP Ghost Eater (2010) and soon their debut studio album Infinite Carcass (2010). Their deal with Emerald Moon Records ended in late 2011, and Girlfight self-released their third EP Defamate that year. The band signed to Mayfly Records and released their fourth EP Real Spite (2012). The group disbanded in April 2013.

== History ==
=== 2008–2010: Early years and Haggard, Ghost Eater, and Infinite Carcass ===
Girlfight was formed in Pittsburgh, Pennsylvania, April 2008, although each member played music since they were teens. The group originally consisted of: Vocalist Dave Watt, guitarist Jordan Bellotti, bassist Gregg Harrington, keyboardist/vocalist Laura Marks, and drummer Lenny Hotkowski. Harrington would leave shortly after the band's creation and was replaced by Lattanzi. After meeting on a tour, Anthony Heubel joined on second guitar for the writing process of Ghost Eater. He would soon exit along with Hotkowski to form the band Run, Forever. Hotkowski was replaced by Brandon Volkman formerly of The Static Transistor.

On May 3, 2008, Girlfight played with My America, Spark is a Diamond, HeyHey, and Innerpartysystem. On May 11, 2008, it was announced that Girlfight signed to Emerald Moon Records and teased an upcoming EP. The EP was recorded in Pittsburgh and then mixed by Paul Leavitt (All Time Low, Cute Is What We Aim For, and The Bled) and mastered by Alan Douches (Converge, Every Time I Die) at West West Side Music. The band would release their debut EP Haggard on October 30, 2008 and on March 16, 2010, the band released their second EP Ghost Eater, the physical release was hand-made by the band and limited to 150 copies. The band began writing for their first full-length studio record, during which time Marks exited the band. They soon met with Chris Owens (Breather Resist, Coliseum, Ed Gein) and started to record at Headbanging Kill Your Mama Music in Louisville, KY. Later that year, on October 16, the band released their debut album Infinite Carcass. Owens provides guest vocals on the track "Doom Route".

The album received praise from many news outlets including the Pittsburgh City Paper and Girlfight appeared on The Taste of Sound on October 23, 2010. On November 20, 2010, Girlfight was featured in Western World Issue #1 among other bands such as Such Gold, Hostage Calm, Transit, and Into It. Over It.

=== 2011–2013: Defamate, Real Spite and break up ===
A music video was made for the track "Doom Route" on March 14, 2011, filmed by Death Perception Pictures at the Infinite Carcass release show. Unfortunately the band's label Emerald Moon Records went defunct in late 2011. Bellotti exited and was temporary replaced by Nick Leombruno for the band's upcoming EP. The band self-released their third EP called Defamate (recorded by John Angelo in Buffalo, NY) on October 25, 2011, and appeared in Milwaukee Magazine with Cut Teeth. Girlfight signed to Mayfly Records on January 25, 2012 and released a single called Holy F*ck on February 22, 2012.

The band was featured on Blare Magazine on "Blare's 5 Best New Artists" alongside Tamaryn, San Cisco, Sky Ferreira, and Naomi Punk on November 5, 2012. The band released a music video for the song "Pitiful Fool," it was filmed and directed by Kevin Wildt and it premiered on Alternative Press. Girlfight did an interview with State In The Real on April 30, 2012. The band started work on their next project with Michael York (Pianos Become The Teeth) at Developing Nations in Baltimore, MD. Girlfight released their fourth EP Real Spite on November 13, 2012.

Girlfight would unexpectedly silently disband sometime in April 2013, it was later confirmed by Volkman on May 27, 2015, on the band's Facebook, "Girlfight is no longer a band. Sorry that it took 2 years for us to admit it on social media."

== Band members ==
- Dave Watt – Vocals (2008–2013)
- Jordan Bellotti – Guitar (2008–2013)
- Richie Lattanzi – Bass (2008–2013)
- Brandon Volkman – Drums (2009–2013)
- Gregg Harrington – Bass (2008–2008)
- Tony Heubel – Guitar (2008–2009)
- Laura Marks – Synth and Vocals (2008–2009)
- Lenny Hotkowski – Drums (2008–2009)
- Nick Leombruno – Guitar (2011–2011)

== Discography ==
Studio albums

- Infinite Carcass (2010)

Extended plays and singles

- Haggard (2008)
- Ghost Eater (2010)
- Defamate (2011)
- Holy F*ck (2012)
- Real Spite (2012)
