= Love Never Fails (B. E. Taylor album) =

Studio album by B. E. Taylor
- Released: November 2006
- Genre: Pop rock, Christian rock
- Length: 52:05
- Label: Chrishae
- Producer: B. E. Taylor, Rick Witkowski

B. E. Taylor chronology
One Nation Under God (2004)	Love Never Fails (2006)

Love Never Fails is the fifth album by American Christian rock singer B. E. Taylor. It was released in November 2006. The album features two covers and remakes of three songs B.E. co-wrote while in the B. E. Taylor Group, whilst the rest are all original recordings. Surprisingly, unlike his previous albums, it features few contributions from outside musicians, and Taylor does almost all of the backing vocals.

The album title is taken from the first book of Corinthians, chapter 13, verse 8.

== Track listing ==
1. "Love Never Fails" – 3:36
2. "What's Goin' On with My Life" – 6:11
3. "Remember" – 4:07
4. "I Like The Way I Feel" – 2:22
5. "Beautiful Day" – 2:24
6. "Karen" – 5:12
7. "Happy Together" – 3:54
8. "Open Up Your Heart" – 3:01
9. "You Came To Me" – 5:01
10. "Mountain" – 3:27
11. "I'm in Love Forever" – 4:06
12. "Eight Days a Week" – 3:09
13. "What Will You Do?" – 3:46
14. "Love Never Fails Take 2" – 3:09

== Personnel ==
- B. E. Taylor – Lead vocals, background vocals (all tracks except track 13), acoustic guitar (tracks 3, 10 and 13), producer, arranger, mixer
- Jamie Peck – Keyboards (tracks 4–7, 9, 10, 11), piano (tracks 1, 2, 3, 8), saxophone (tracks 4–7), bass (tracks 7 and 9), strings (track 13), organ (track 2), pads (track 2), horns (track 10), programmer (track 9), arranger, mixer
- Rick Witkowski – Guitar (all tracks except track 3), producer, arranger, mixer
- Jeff Garrison – Bass (tracks 2, 3, 8, 10 and 11)
- Tom Bellin – Bass (tracks 1, 2, 4–6 and 12)
- Sean Jones – Trumpet (track 2)
- Margot B. – Background vocals (track 2)
