= Animal Notes =

Studio album by Crack the Sky
- Released: 1976
- Recorded: 1976
- Studios: Record Plant, New York City; CBS Studios, New York City (Orchestra)
- Genre: Progressive rock
- Length: 38:06
- Label: Lifesong
- Producers: Terence P. Minogue, Marty Nelson, William Kirkland

Crack the Sky chronology
Crack the Sky (1975)	Animal Notes (1976)	Safety in Numbers (1978)

Professional ratings
Review scores
Source	Rating
Allmusic	3.5/5 stars
Christgau's Record Guide	B

Animal Notes is the second album by American rock band Crack the Sky, released in 1976 (see 1976 in music).

== Track listing ==
All tracks are written by John Palumbo.

No.	Title	Length
1.	"We Want Mine"	4:54
2.	"Animal Skins"	3:33
3.	"Wet Teenager"	3:32
4.	"Maybe I Can Fool Everybody (Tonight)"	5:57
5.	"Rangers at Midnight" (Including 'Night Patrol' and featuring 'Let's Lift Our Hearts Up')	7:34
6.	"Virgin… No"	4:55
7.	"Invaders from Mars"	3:31
8.	"Play On"	4:10

=== Alternate version ===
In 1989, Lifesong released a CD pairing Animal Notes with Safety in Numbers on a single disc (LSCD-8803). To fit both albums on one CD, the track "Prelude to Safety in Numbers" was omitted from the latter album.

== Personnel ==
=== Crack the Sky ===
- John Palumbo — Lead vocals, keyboards, acoustic guitar, harmonies
- Rick Witkowski – Electric guitar, harmonies
- Joe Macre – Bass guitar, harmonies
- Jim Griffiths – Electric guitar, harmonies
- Joey D'Amico – Drums, harmonies

=== Additional musicians ===
- David Sackson — Concert master
- "Singin' Mounties" — Vocals ("Rangers at Midnight")
- George Marge — Horns ("We Want Mine")
- Robert "Chic" DiCiccio – Horns ("We Want Mine")
- Gotham City Swing Band – Horns ("We Want Mine")

=== Production ===
- Terence P. Minogue – Producer
- Marty Nelson – Producer
- William Kirkland – Producer
- Shelly Yakus – Engineer
- Andy Abrams – Engineer
- Don Puluse – Recorded orchestra
- Terence P. Minogue – Horn and string arrangements
- Danny Palumbo – Live sound engineer
- Darrell Grysko – Lighting design
- Hauser and D'Orio – Back cover photography
- Guy Billout – Illustration
- Lopaka – Art direction and design
