= Rookie of the Year (band) =

American rock band

- Origin: Fayetteville, North Carolina, United States
- Genres: Rock; Indie Rock; Pop Punk; Acoustic; Emo
- Years active: 2005–present
- Labels: Cardigan Records; Future Destination Records; One Eleven; Punkerton Records
- Members: Ryan Dunson; Chris Moropoulos; Andrew Saenz

Rookie of the Year is an indie rock/acoustic band from Fayetteville, North Carolina, fronted by lead singer/songwriter Ryan Dunson of Raleigh, North Carolina. They were signed to One Eleven Records, though their third release fulfilled their contractual obligation to One Eleven and allowed them to sign with a new label. Released "Better Off Dead" on June 4, 2026 on all streaming platforms.

== Biography ==
The band was formed in 2005 as a solo project of singer Ryan Dunson. Dunson signed with Vice Verse Virtue Records, a Tennessee record label, in late 2005. Soon after, Dunson signed to One Eleven Records, releasing a 1000-copy EP called Late Night Makeout. In 2005 One Eleven Records released the band's first record, Having to Let Go, as a 13-track LP. In 2005, One Eleven Records re-released the album as a 10-track LP. After expanding to a five-piece, their second album, The Goodnight Moon, was released in April 2006 to critical acclaim and widespread fan approval. Following this release, they toured through North America on the Warped Tour.

In March 2008 Mick Parsons from the Tooth and Nail records band Jonezetta joined band on drums.

Their full-length record Sweet Attention was released on August 5, 2008, on One Eleven Records. Over the next 12 months, the band toured non-stop promoting the release, including two headlining tours as well as a prominent tour supporting reunited boy-band LFO. The band would do multiple tours with Secondhand Serenade, playing as Secondhand Serenade's live band if needed.

In June 2010 they released an 8-track EP titled The Most Beautiful, featuring the singles "Turn the Page" and "Frustrated".

David Whitney, (drummer) was killed in a car accident on July 4, 2011.

January 11, 2012, Rookie of the Year release an Acoustic/EP called Along for the Ride featuring the song "Dallas".

Rookie Of The Year officially release Canova Presents: The Goodnight Moon Part II Featuring the singles: "Love/Me/Crazy", "Save Me" and "Colors of Summer".

In early 2017, it was announced that Rookie Of The Year would be touring as a full band for the first time since 2011. The band completed a 6-week national comeback tour which included headline dates and support dates with Forever The Sickest Kids, He Is We, For The Win, and The New Low.

In late 2018, the band toured in celebration of the 10 year anniversary of Sweet Attention, completed another headlining tour, and toured as direct support for Tooth & Nail Records' MAE, with additional support from LOYALS.

Starting in 2023, Rookie of the Year began touring again with national acts such as Emblem3, Every Avenue, Makeout, Audio Karate, FenixTX, Mest, Amber Pacific, Watashi Wa, The Color Fred, Framing Hanley, Tyler Hilton, amongst others, all supporting the release of the "WTF" EP featuring singles "Givin Up Now" and "Many Mistakes." The EP showcased multiple features from artists like Matthew Thiessen of Relient K, Bradley Walden of Emarosa, Ryan Cabrera, and Shontelle.

On October 4, 2024, Rookie of the Year released the "WTF" EP and was distributed by Punkerton Records on vinyl.

In 2026, the band announced 20 years of "The Goodnight Moon" anniversary tour in June with Just Surrender. They are set to continue the tour in July with Dave Elkins of Mae across the following cities: Cincinnati, Chicago, Detroit, and Dayton.

The band has been extensively recording a new album with Fred Mascherino of Taking Back Sunday. No word of a release date yet.

== Discography ==
=== Albums ===
- Having to Let Go (2005)
- The Goodnight Moon (April 11, 2006, 111 Records)
- Sweet Attention (August 5, 2008, 111 Records) U.S. Billboard Heatseekers No. 11 and No. 9 on Billboard's Alternative New Artist chart.
- The Most Beautiful (June 7, 2010, Future Destination Records)
- The Goodnight Moon Part II (August 13, 2013, Future Destination Records distro)
- WTF (October 4, 2024, Punkerton Records)

=== EPs ===
- Since I Left Your World (2009, 111 Records)
- Along For The Ride (January 11, 2012)
- Run For Cover(s) (April 23, 2019)

== Members ==
=== Current members ===
- Ryan Dunson - Lead Vocals, Guitar
- Chris Moropoulos - Drums
- Timothy Mills - Bass
- Andrew Saenz - Lead Guitar

=== Former live members ===
- Mike Kamerman - 2005-2010 (Guitar, Vocals)
- Pat Murphy - (2005-2009) (Bass)
- Brandon Schade - 2006-2009 (Guitar)
- David Whitney - 2007 (Drums)
- TJ Holt - 2004-2006 (Drums)
- Mick Parsons - 2007-2008 (Drums)
- Jordan Young - 2009-2010 (Drums)
- Vito Apollo - 2007-2009 (Keyboards)
- Daniel Kerrigan - 2009 (Keyboards/Guitar)
- Zack Reichert - 2009-2010 (Guitar)
- Joshua Duncan - 2014-2015 (Saxophone/Back-up vocalist)
- Jeff Nations - 2017-2019 (Drums, Percussion, Background Vocals)
- Adam Wirth - 2017-2019 (Bass, Background Vocals)
- Max Gerbik - 2024 (Bass, Background Vocals)

== Music videos ==
- Liars and Battlelines (2007)
- What Is Love (2008)
- Sooner or Later (The Next Move) (2009)
- Slow Down (2009)
- Hey Lauren (2010)
- Wake me up (it's Christmas) (2010)
- Dallas (2012)
- Everything (2017)
- Empty House (2018)
