= Love Never Faileth =

- Author: Eknath Easwaran
- Language: English (original); Greek, Portuguese, Spanish
- Series: Classics of Christian Inspiration
- Publisher: Nilgiri Press
- Publication date: 1984; 1996; others
- Pages: 207 (1984); 288 (1996)
- ISBN: 0915132907
- OCLC: 34943263

Love Never Faileth is a practical commentary on Saint Francis, Saint Paul, Saint Augustine, and Mother Teresa. Written by Eknath Easwaran, the book was originally published in the United States in 1984.

Subsequent editions of the book have been published in the US and India, and foreign (non-English) editions have also been published in several languages. The book's original subtitle was the inspiration of Saint Francis, Saint Augustine, Saint Paul, Mother Teresa. In its second edition in 1996, as part of a 3-book series entitled Classics of Christian Inspiration, the book was subtitled Eknath Easwaran on St. Francis, St. Paul, St. Augustine, & Mother Teresa.

== Topics covered ==
Each edition of Love Never Faileth contains a separate part on each of the four Christian spiritual figures mentioned in the book's subtitle. Each part contains a short introduction by Carol Lee Flinders, followed by a longer commentary by Easwaran. The book also contains a short overall introduction by Flinders. Each of Easwaran's commentaries is structured around a text: The Prayer of Saint Francis, Mother Teresa's "Love is a fruit in season at all times," Paul's Epistle on Love, and Augustine's description from the Confessions of what it is to "Enter into the joy of the Lord."

To clarify the commentaries, each edition also concludes with a brief description of the text-focused method of meditation that is several times mentioned by Easwaran. The 1984 edition also includes woodblock prints of each of the faces of each of the four spiritual figures. The 1996 edition includes an 8-page index.

== Reception ==
Reviews have appeared in the National Catholic Reporter, Studia Mystica, the Western New York Catholic, Prairie Messenger, and The B.C. Catholic,

The National Catholic Reporter stated that in Love Never Faileth, "Easwaran describes the way [these spiritual figures] think, pray and live and invites us to slow down our franticness, examine our priorities and follow an eight-step program that will make all life take on the quality of a summer retreat - bright with hope and beauty."

In Studia Mystica, Wayne Teasdale wrote that "Love Never Faileth is a very important new addition to the literature of meditation." He wrote that the book

is a unique attempt to lead people into the concrete realization, that is, in their daily lives, of love's ultimacy and its great power to heal as well as transform. It goes beyond the mere hortatory purpose of most hagiographies, beyond edification, and distills the innermost moral teaching of the saints (an innermost teaching that is eminently mystical). [The author] takes this teaching ... and applies it to everyday life, showing also how every one of us can do the same as the saints.

Teasdale also noted that "Half the book is devoted to Augustine, and the briefest chapter is devoted to Mother Teresa's vision ... this is not a speculative work .... This is a very practical book by a very practical spiritual teacher."

The Western New York Catholic stated that "This book shows how, in specific terms, we can all stretch our capacity to love beyond anything we can imagine and how prayer with meditation can tap inner strength at will .... The methods used in Love Never Faileth were familiar in the early Church, as the author illustrates through his use of inspirational passages from the four 'great lovers of God.'"

Prairie Messenger, a Roman Catholic publication, stated that Easwaran "was formed on both Christian and Oriental scriptures ... [and] seems especially at home in Love Never Faileth ... To each [chapter] an introduction ... sets the stage for Easwaran's dramatic reading of each of his favorites."

The B. C. Catholic wrote that the chapters on Saint Francis and Mother Teresa most compellingly show Easwaran's "special fondness for people who suffer from material and spiritual poverty and especially from a lack of love .... His meditation on St. Francis' Prayer ... is the most inspiring I have read, especially as Easwaran illustrates it with anecdotes from his own life."

== Editions ==
The original edition was published in 1984 by Nilgiri Press, who republished it in 1996 as one volume in a series entitled Classics of Christian Inspiration. Editions of Love Never Faileth have been published in Greek, Portuguese, and Spanish, and English-language editions have been published in India and the US. The US editions are:

- Eknath, Eknath (1996). Love never faileth: Eknath Easwaran on Saint Francis, Saint Paul, Saint Augustine & Mother Teresa (2nd ed.). Tomales, CA: Nilgiri Press. ISBN 0915132907. ISBN 0915132893, OCLC 34943263 (288 pages)
- Easwaran, Eknath (1984). Love never faileth: The inspiration of Saint Francis, Saint Augustine, Saint Paul, Mother Teresa (1st ed.). Petaluma, CA: Nilgiri Press. ISBN 0915132311. ISBN 091513232X, OCLC 11236223 (207 pages)

The Indian edition:

- Easwaran, Eknath (1999). Love never faileth: Eknath Easwaran on Saint Francis, Saint Paul, Saint Augustine & Mother Teresa (1st Indian ed.). New Delhi, India: Penguin Books. ISBN 9780140292299. ISBN 0140292292, OCLC 52586654 (288pages) (title of original 1984 US edition: Love Never Faileth)

== See also ==
- Original Goodness (book)
- Seeing with the Eyes of Love
