= Dog City (Crack the Sky album) =

Studio album by Crack the Sky
- Released: 1990
- Genre: Rock
- Length: 52:07
- Label: Grudge

Crack the Sky chronology
From the Greenhouse (1989)	Dog City (1990)	Cut (1998)

Dog City is a studio album by the American band Crack the Sky, released in 1990.

== Critical reception ==
Professional ratings
Review scores
Source	Rating
AllMusic	2.5/5 stars
Rocky Mountain News	D

The Washington Post wrote: "Like Jeff Lynne, everything John Palumbo touches in the studio has a certain cleverness and sheen about it, and Dog City is about as crafty an album as you're likely to find on an independent label. Still, for all of Palumbo's production know-how,Dog City is only as good as the songs, which makes it a rather dicey bet." The Colorado Springs Gazette-Telegraph panned the forced topicality of the songs, also writing that "dim musical presentation doesn't exactly spruce up this LP's listenability, either." The Rocky Mountain News noted that "Crack the Sky is guilty of one of rock 'n' roll's deadly sins: wrapping politically charged messages in dull, plodding music."

== Track listing ==
No.	Title	Length
1.	"Dog City Intro"	1:05
2.	"Dog City"	7:10
3.	"Love Me Like a Terrorist"	4:40
4.	"Lost Boys"	6:40
5.	"Mr. President"	5:37
6.	"Quicksand"	6:25
7.	"Waiting for the New World"	5:12
8.	"Don't Call Me Brother"	4:37
9.	"I'll Be There"	5:02
10.	"Dog Redux"	3:39

== Personnel ==
Crack the Sky

- John Palumbo – guitar, bass guitar, drums, vocals
- Rick Witkowski – lead guitar, keyboards
- Vince DePaul – keyboards
- Carey Ziegler – bass guitar
- Joe D'Amico – backing vocals

Additional musicians

- Marvin Brown, Terry Williams, Mark Easley, Krista, the Harrison Hill Gospel Group, the Roz Diamond Children's Choir – background vocalists
- Leo McLaughlin – blues harp

Production

- Steve Palmieri – engineer
