= Vitamin L =

Single by B.E. Taylor Group

from the album Love Won the Fight
- A-side: "Vitamin L (Club Version)"
- B-side: "Vitamin L (LP Version)"
- Released: 1983
- Genre: Electropop
- Length: 5:29
- Label: MCA Records
- Songwriters: Rick Witkowski, Debbie Witkowski
- Producers: Rick Witkowski, Joe Macre

B.E. Taylor Group singles chronology
"Love Won the Fight" (1983)	"Vitamin L" (1983)	"Dangerous Rhythm" (1986)

"Vitamin L" is a song by the American pop rock band B.E. Taylor Group. Written by Rick Witkowski, the song is on the band's band's second album, Love Won the Fight. It peaked at No. 6 on the Billboard Hot 100 in 1984.

It is the fifth track on Love Won the Fight, and also the third single pulled from that album. In a departure of the norm of B. E. Taylor singing lead vocals, drummer Joey d'Amico sings lead on this track. It also heavily uses synthesizers and a brass sections as the main instruments. The guitar's role is minimized to a steady strumming pattern with sustained power chords in the chorus.

The lyrics tell the story of a man whose medical condition can only be treated with an unstable drug, called Vitamin L, that reacts "when boy meets girl". In the last verse, it is revealed the drug was, in fact, love, and the man is cured of his ailment when he falls in love with a woman.

This song is the B. E. Taylor Group's most popular song, as it peaked at #66 on the Billboard Hot 100 in 1984 and stayed on the chart for eight weeks. The song also spawned a popular music video that scored heavy airplay on MTV. B. E. and Rick Witkowski are featured as the doctor and pharmacist in the video, respectively. The song also is a near constant at live performances.

B. E. Taylor later re-recorded this song on his first solo album, Try Love, as more of a rock song, getting rid of the synthesizers and making the bass, lead guitar, and drums much more involved. The lyrics in the verses have entire lines changed as well, mildly changing the story in the process, e.g. "A chemical reaction occurs/Every time that boys meets girl" to "It could keep us all in touch/But we can never take too much", erasing the idea that the vitamin is an unstable drug. Three whole lines in the third verse are changed, but these do not change the story in any way.

== Track listing ==
1. A. "Vitamin L" (Club Version) (4:46)
2. B. "Vitamin L" (LP Version) (5:29)
