= This Is What Happens =

Studio album by The Reign of Kindo
- Released: 2010
- Genre: Indie rock, Jazz rock
- Length: 55:22 (Standard Edition); 60:30 (Japanese Edition)
- Label: CandyRat Records
- Producer: The Reign of Kindo

The Reign of Kindo chronology
Rhythm, Chord & Melody (2008)	This Is What Happens (2010)	Christmas EP (2010)

This Is What Happens is an album by the New York band The Reign of Kindo. This album is also the last with piano/trumpet player Kelly Sciandra. The band also released an 8-bit digital version of This Is What Happens entitled This Is Also What Happens.

== Track listing ==
No.	Title	Length
1.	"Thrill of the Fall"	4:07
2.	"Now We've Made Our Ascent"	3:18
3.	"Symptom of a Stumbling"	3:52
4.	"Bullets in the Air"	3:25
5.	"Flowers by the Moon"	4:35
6.	"Nightingale"	4:25
7.	"Blistered Hands"	3:33
8.	"Out of Sight, Out of Mind"	4:07
9.	"Comfort in the Orchestration"	5:39
10.	"City Lights & Traffic Sounds"	3:55
11.	"Battling the Years"	4:40
12.	"Soon It Shall Be"	5:00
13.	"Psalm"	4:46
Total length:		55:22
