= Safety in Numbers (Crack the Sky album) =

Studio album by Crack the Sky
- Released: 1978
- Recorded: 1978
- Studio: Le Studio, Morin Heights, Quebec
- Genre: Rock
- Length: 33:45
- Label: Lifesong
- Producer: Rob Stevens

Crack the Sky chronology
Animal Notes (1976)	Safety in Numbers (1978)	White Music (1980)

Safety in Numbers is the third studio album by American rock band Crack the Sky. It was released in 1978 by Lifesong Records (catalog #JZ 35041). It is the band's highest-charting release on the Billboard album chart, peaking at No. 126.

This album is markedly different from the previous two Crack the Sky releases, being largely written by Rick Witkowski with Joe Macre and Rob Stevens. Keyboardist/vocalist John Palumbo, who had previously composed all of Crack the Sky's material, departed the band early in the recording process for Safety in Numbers. Consequently, Palumbo is not credited as a band member on the finished album, though the re-organized group did end up using three of his songs (one a co-write with several other Crack The Sky members).

To replace Palumbo, the band recruited Gary Lee Chappell to sing, and producer Rob Stevens to play keyboards. However, only the original band members (Joey D'Amico, Joe Macre, Jim Griffiths, Rick Witkowski) are pictured on the back cover of the album, with Chappell and Stevens relegated to one small photo each on the inside sleeve. There was a tour in support of the album (documented on Live Sky and Alive and Kickin' Ass), after which the band folded.

In 1980, Palumbo and guitarist Rick Witkowski started a new version of the band and released White Music. Crack the Sky has continued recording ever since; Safety in Numbers remains their only studio album that does not feature Palumbo as lead vocalist/chief songwriter.

2007 saw the release of Safety in Numbers: 21st Century Redux, a new version of the original album with vocals by Palumbo, a different running order and two extra tracks.

== Critical reception ==
Professional ratings
Review scores
Source	Rating
AllMusic	3/5 stars

The Bangor Daily News deemed the album "a most accessible blend of sophisticated, slightly metallic and thoroughly exciting rock." The Courier News opined that "the melodies come across as strident, jumpy and just plain unappealing."

== Track listing ==
No.	Title	Writer(s)	Length
1.	"Nuclear Apathy"	John Palumbo	8:32
2.	"Long Nights"	Palumbo	3:59
3.	"Flashlight"	Palumbo, Joey D'Amico, Joe Macre, Jim Griffiths, Rick Witkowski	4:45
4.	"Prelude to Safety in Numbers"	Macre, Witkowski	1:15
5.	"Lighten Up McGraw"	Rob Stevens, Witkowski, Macre	5:08
6.	"Give Myself to You"	Witkowski, Stevens	3:23
7.	"A Night on the Town (With Snow White)"	Witkowski, Deborah Kucan	3:25
8.	"Safety in Numbers"	Macre, Witkowski	6:41

== Personnel ==
Musicians

- Joey D'Amico – Percussion, back-up vocals, lead vocals ("Long Nights")
- Jim Griffiths – Electric and acoustic guitar, back-up vocals
- Joe Macre – Electric and synthesized bass guitar, Moog pedals, back-up vocals
- Rick Witkowski – Electric and acoustic guitars, Mellotron, back-up vocals
- Gary Lee Chappell – Lead vocals, back-up vocals, acoustic guitar
- Rob Stevens – Piano, Minimoog, Oberheim synthesizer

Production

- Producer – Rob Stevens
- Nick Blagona – Engineer
- Bernard Dubouc – Assistant engineer
- George Marino – Mastering

Additional credits

- Recorded and mixed at Le Studio, Morin Heights, Quebec, Canada
- Mastered at Sterling Sound, New York City
- Jay Maisel – Cover photo
- Don Hunstein – Inner sleeve photo
- Tom Hill – Inner sleeve photo
- Sandy Speiser – Back cover photo
- Gerard Huerta – Hand lettering
- John Berg – Cover design
- Nancy Greenberg – Cover design
- Susan Senk – Production coordinator
- LSR Strings – Acoustic guitar strings
- Vince DePaul – Keyboards (on tour)

== Alternate versions ==
In 1989, Lifesong released a CD pairing Safety in Numbers with Animal Notes on a single disc (LSCD-8803). To fit both albums on one CD, the song "Prelude to Safety in Numbers" was omitted.
