= Crack the Sky (Crack the Sky album) =

Studio album by Crack the Sky
- Released: November 1975
- Recorded: 1974–1975
- Genre: Progressive rock
- Length: 40:48
- Label: Lifesong
- Producers: Terence P. Minogue, Marty Nelson, William Kirkland

Crack the Sky chronology
| Crack the Sky (1975) | Animal Notes (1976) |

Professional ratings
Review scores
| Source | Rating |
|---|---|
| Allmusic | Link |
| Christgau's Record Guide | B− |

Crack the Sky is the debut album by American rock band Crack the Sky, released on LP in 1975 (see 1975 in music) by Lifesong Records. In 2015, it was ranked number 47 in the Rolling Stone list of "50 Greatest Prog Rock Albums of All Time".

== Track listing ==
All tracks are written by John Palumbo.

| No. | Title | Length |
|---|---|---|
| 1. | "Hold On" | 3:00 |
| 2. | "Surf City" | 3:54 |
| 3. | "Sea Epic" | 6:33 |
| 4. | "She's a Dancer" | 3:54 |
| 5. | "Robots for Ronnie" | 4:39 |
| 6. | "Ice" | 4:36 |
| 7. | "Mind Baby" | 4:32 |
| 8. | "I Don't Have a Tie" | 3:04 |
| 9. | "Sleep" | 7:48 |

== Personnel ==
=== Crack the Sky ===
- John Palumbo – Lead vocals, keyboards, guitar
- Rick Witkowski – Lead guitar, percussion
- Joe Macre – Bass guitar, back-up vocals
- Jim Griffiths – Lead guitar, back-up vocals
- Joey D'Amico – Drums, back-up vocals

=== Additional musicians ===
- Michael Brecker — Horns ("She's a Dancer", "Mind Baby")
- Randy Brecker — Horns ("She's a Dancer", "Mind Baby")
- David Sanborn — Horns ("She's a Dancer", "Mind Baby")
- George Marge — Woodwinds ("Robots for Ronnie", "Sleep", "Sea Epic")
- Tom Jones — Trombone ("Sleep")

=== Production ===
- Terence P. Minogue – Producer
- Marty Nelson – Producer
- William Kirkland – Producer
- Donald Puluse – Recording and mixing engineer
- Terry Cashman — Executive producer
- Tommy West – Executive producer
- Stan Kalina – Mastering engineer
- Vinny Adinolfi – 2002 CD producer
- Elliott Federman – 2002 CD remastering
- Ted Brosman – Tape master

== Additional credits ==
- Recorded and mastered at CBS Studios, 52nd St., New York City
- Recorded at Columbia Records Studio, 32nd St., New York (orchestra on "Ice")
- Recorded at Minot Sound Studios, White Plains, New York ("Sleep")
- Susan Senk – Cover coordination
- Mary Walsh – Front cover photography
- Benno Friedman – Back cover photography
- Bob Heimall – Art direction and design
- Danny Palumbo – Major domo
- Petillo Strings – Acoustic guitar strings
- "Thank you orchestra and all of our Stainless Steel Groups of Chums"
- Amy Bennick – Art direction, design (2002 CD)
- "Special thanks to Kevin Stander and Steve Smolen of Record & Tape Traders, Terence P. Minogue for taking the time to tell the story, and Mike Ragogna, as always for his guidance."
- Merri Kirkland – Spanish translation ("I Don't Have a Tie")
- 2002 CD remastered at SAJE Sound, New York City

== Alternate versions ==
In 1988, Lifesong released a CD pairing Crack the Sky with White Music on a single disc (LSCD-8801). To fit both albums on one CD, the song "Mind Baby" and two tracks from White Music were omitted. In 2002, a reinvented and mastered CD of Crack the Sky was released. It included four bonus tracks: demo versions of "Let Me Go Home (A Visit to the Projects)", "Eileen, I Lean on You", and "Hold On"; and "Dr. Octopus Part 2" from the Spider-Man: Rock Reflections of a Superhero album. It is noted the song "Sleep" fades out more than a minute earlier than the original LP version. Liner notes include track-by-track comments by original producer and long-time CTS compatriot, Terence P. Minogue.

== Sources ==
- LP and CD liner notes
