= The Spill Canvas =

American alternative rock band

- The Spill Canvas at the Masquerade in Atlanta, September 16, 2005

Background information
- Origin: Sioux Falls, South Dakota, U.S.
- Genres: Alternative rock; emo pop
- Years active: 2001–present
- Labels: 111 Records; Sire Records; Pure Noise Records
- Spinoff of: Nodes of Ranvier
- Members: Nick Thomas; Landon Heil; Evan Pharmakis
- Past members: Brian Anderson; Brandon Aegerter; Joe Beck; Alan Burkhard; Becca Flinn; Dan Ludeman; Scott McGuire; Hannah Pesky; Ross Wheeler; Bryce Job
- Website: thespillcanvas.net

The Spill Canvas is an American alternative rock band from Sioux Falls, South Dakota. They are known for their hits "All Over You", "All Hail the Heartbreaker", and "Polygraph, Right Now!", as well as several emo classics including "Our Song", "The Tide", and "This Is for Keeps."

== Career ==
Lead singer and guitarist Nick Thomas (born May 25, 1984) grew up in Sioux Falls, South Dakota, and began learning how to play guitar at 11 years old. Thomas attended Roosevelt High School in the city and sang with the school concert choir and men's choir. He began performing at local venues with his acoustic guitar at 15-years-old and self-released his first punk rock and acoustic CD titled The Blur of Motions in 2000 with Prairie Dog Studios. Thomas envisioned the Spill Canvas in the summer of 2001 as a collage of unique musical sounds and ideas coming together to form a unique palette. Vocalist Becca Flinn approached Thomas after a solo show and the two formed the beginnings of the band, adding bassist Alan Burkhard and violinist Hannah Peskey. The band combined a subtle symphonic sound with aggressive acoustic rock. Flinn, Burkhard, and Peskey dropped out of the group less than a year after joining. Thomas retained the band name as a solo project while performing as a guitarist and backup vocalist for Nodes of Ranvier until his departure in early 2003 to pursue developing his band full time.

The Spill Canvas self-released its first five-song CD titled Concept EP in May 2003, produced at Cathouse Studios in Sioux Falls. The band signed with Florida-based, independent label One Eleven Records shortly after the CD release. Label owner Brad Fischetti discovered the band on the online streaming website MP3.com. The band's first widespread album, Sunsets and Car Crashes, which was written, produced, and performed by Thomas, was released by One Eleven Records on April 20, 2004. Thomas was joined by members Joe Beck, Brian Anderson, Ross Wheeler, and Brandon Aegerter to tour after the release of Sunsets and Car Crashes. Wheeler, Anderson, and Aegerter later left the group and were replaced by Scott McGuire and Dan Ludeman. The four members collectively wrote what would be The Spill Canvas' second album, One Fell Swoop. The album was released August 9, 2005, by One Eleven Records once again.

On their official page in late 2006, the band announced a change of label through a news post by bassist Scott McGuire; "Also, did I mention that there is a new record label in the picture? That's right, we have signed to Sire Records."

In early 2007, McGuire declared that he was no longer a part of the band, saying, "The Spill Canvas has decided in order to make music to its fullest potential, they must do so without me." The temporary replacement for McGuire was Landon Heil, the guitarist of another band known as The Glass Atlantic. Being a better creative fit than McGuire, Heil quickly became a permanent member of the outfit.

On May 1, 2007, the band released an EP entitled Denial Feels So Good, to hold their fans over until their new album arrived. The EP consisted of three original songs and two covers. Marc Sheaffer, a keyboardist from Sioux Falls, played keys on "Gold Dust Woman". After the release of the EP, the band played on the entire summer 2007 Warped Tour, promoting the upcoming release of their third album and first major label debut No Really, I'm Fine. The new album was recorded in March and April 2007, and in Alternative Press Issue 229, it was confirmed that Anthony Green of Circa Survive and Andrew McMahon of Jack's Mannequin would be guests on the new album. Green sang backup vocals on the song "Bleed, Everyone's Doing It", and McMahon played keyboards in the re-recorded version of the song "Saved", a song originally recorded for the soundtrack of the motion picture, Superman Returns.

On July 26, 2007, No Really, I'm Fine was rumored to be the title of the upcoming album. This agreement lasted for two years. Soon after, however, websites such as Amazon.com and Best Buy had listed the new album with the title Conduit. On August 28, 2007, the band posted a Myspace bulletin saying that the album was going to be titled No Really, I'm Fine. The album was released under this title on October 2, 2007.

The band went on a Fall tour across North America in the Fall of 2007, named "All Your Favorite Spots". The tour was supported by Meg & Dia, Playradioplay!, and Treaty of Paris. On January 23, 2008, it was confirmed on Yellowcard's official MySpace that The Spill Canvas would be touring with them in a spring acoustic tour. In February 2008, they headed to Europe with Plain White T's and The Fold. In the summer of 2008, The Spill Canvas headlined a national tour, supported by Steel Train and Ludo. Up-and-coming pop-punkers Sing It Loud joined them for the first half of the tour, with Liam and Me joining for the end. They were joined by Motion City Soundtrack for the final leg of the tour.

In late 2008, they toured with OneRepublic, The Hush Sound, and Augustana. On this tour, most vocalists from all of the opening bands, including Nick, came up during Augustana's set to perform Traveling Wilbury's hit "Handle With Care", trading off lead vocals. In early 2009, The Spill Canvas toured the UK supporting You Me at Six alongside Emarosa.

Abnormalities, featuring new music from the band, was released on January 12, 2010, through The Spill Canvas store and digital retailers. Their next EP, Realities, was released shortly thereafter on April 13. On July 27, 2010, their newest album, Formalities, saw digital release. The album contains songs previously seen on both Realities and Abnormalities, along with acoustic versions of songs from those EPs and two brand new songs. They spent the summer of 2010 touring with the Goo Goo Dolls and Switchfoot.

On January 13, 2011, an article in the Sioux Falls Argus Leader said that the band may be on a temporary hiatus and there was no indication when, if ever, the band would return. On May 15, 2011, after a long time of being inactive on Twitter, "Someday soon" was tweeted from The Spill Canvas. On August 11, 2011, the band posted, "Tell your friends to follow @thespillcanvas we are going to be posting lots of interesting news and announcements in the coming weeks!" on Twitter. The Spill Canvas played a "reunion show" in their hometown of Sioux Falls, SD on October 28, 2011, during which they announced they are no longer on a label and plan to record a new album, with a Kickstarter campaign raising funds to record it. They played a new song at the show.

On January 21, 2012, The Spill Canvas posted a studio update on YouTube. The Spill Canvas will release their new album, Gestalt, on May 22, 2012, according to their Facebook account. The song "Parallels and Money" was included on this album. On April 20, 2012, The Spill Canvas released the first track off of their upcoming album Gestalt, called "To Chicago" on their PureVolume account. The song reached number one on PureVolume.

After a hiatus lead singer Nick Thomas released a solo record funded by Kickstarter called Shadowars in 2014. The singer has been touring the record nationally with spill canvas bassist Landon Heil and new drummer Bryce Job. Thomas and Job embarked on a brief east coast acoustic run with another South Dakota band Paradise Fears and William Beckett of The Academy Is.

Then the full Nick Thomas band toured in November with co-headliners Deleasa and Cassio Monroe spanning the east coast. In December the NT band headlined a tour including Midwest and West coast dates with openers My Body Sings Electric from Denver. Afterwards, the Nick Thomas band performed on the Radio Revival Tour with Secondhand Serenade and Ryan Cabrera. The Spill Canvas joined Motion City Soundtrack's 10 year anniversary of Commit This To Memory tour in July 2015. The band also celebrated a 10-year anniversary tour of One Fell Swoop in August 2015.

The band started a requestour in April 2016. They allowed fans to vote for their favorite songs to be played at the show. The voting was on a per city basis. While not officially a member of The Spill Canvas, Mike Naran played guitar as part of their live show since joining them in Cambridge, Massachusetts in August, 2015. The band worked on a new album, which followed up their album "Gestalt". The Spill Canvas performed at Webster Hall on May 4, 2017, during Emo Nite LA's NYC concert.

Evan Pharmakis (lead guitar/vocals)joined the band at the tail end of 2017, shortly before the band was on tour with Punchline and Selfish Things from Toronto, supporting their new EP Hivemind, released July 20, 2018. In January 2021, the band announced that they would release a new album, "Conduit", on March 5, 2021, via Pure Noise Records.

== Band members ==
=== Current members ===
- Nick Thomas – lead vocals, rhythm guitar, piano, keyboard, production
- Landon Heil – bass
- Evan Pharmakis - lead guitar, backing vocals

=== Past members ===
- Dan Ludeman – guitars, backing vocals
- Joe Beck - drums
- Bryce Job - drums, backing vocals
- Scott McGuire - bass
- Mike Naran - guitar, backing Vocals
- Brian Anderson - guitar, vocals

== Discography ==
=== Albums ===
- Go for the Jugular (2002)
- Sunsets & Car Crashes (2004)
- One Fell Swoop (2005), No. 29 Top Heatseekers, No. 47 Top Independent Albums
- No Really, I'm Fine (2007), No. 2 Top Heatseekers, No. 143 Billboard 200
- Scraps/No Really, I'm Fine (2008)
- Formalities (2010)
- Gestalt (2012)
- Conduit (2021)

=== EPs ===
- Denial Feels So Good (2007)
- Honestly, I'm Doing Okay (2008)
- Abnormalities (2010)
- Realities (2010)
- Hivemind (2018)
- Copycat Volume 1 (2023)

== Additional research ==
- KSFY's Drew Sandholm interviews Nick Thomas, 17 November 2007
- "Local Band Goes Big" article from KSFY, Sioux Falls media.
- argusleader.com/article/20110113/ENT05/101130327/1005/ENT (dead link)
- dakotanewsnow.com/index.php?option=com_content&task=view&id=12951&Itemid=57#video (dead link)
