= Innermission =

Innermission was the first major label release for the B.E. Taylor Group, released in 1982 on MCA Records (as MCA-5335).

== Track listing ==
1. "Never Hold Back" - 5:03
2. "Stand Up for Love" - 3:22
3. "I Like the Way I Feel" - 4:32
4. "Be My Baby" - 3:24
5. "Not Enough Love" - 5:13
6. "Just Like in the Movies" - 5:12
7. "Under the Rug" - 4:12
8. "Makin' My Move" - 4:06
9. "On and On" - 4:37

Produced by Mark Avsec and Donnie Iris for the Belkin / Maduri Organization. Executive Producer - Carl Maduri.

All tracks written by B.E. Taylor except "Be My Baby" (a cover of the Ronettes 1963 #2 hit) written by Ellie Greenwich, Jeff Barry and Phil Spector.
