= Thin Dark Line =

American alternative rock band

- Origin: Reisterstown, Maryland, United States
- Genres: Alternative rock
- Years active: 2002 – Present
- Labels: One Eleven Records
- Members: Bryan Barnes; Mike Barnes; Brent Kaminski; Ian Dexter
- Past members: Mikey Lawson (bass); Cheyne Truitt (drums); Pat Stevenson (bass); Adam Thompson (drums); Andy Cerdan (drums); Paul Leavitt (drums, guitar); Don Bradshaw (guitar); Brandon Cater (drums)

Thin Dark Line is a band from Reisterstown, Maryland. They are signed to One Eleven Records.

== Discography ==
=== Albums ===
- The Upcoming (EP) (5/25/2003, Self-Released)
- Tonight, We Ride (EP) (5/15/2004, One Eleven Records)
- The Resolution (10/25/2005, One Eleven Records)
- North Col, "Three" (EP) Produced, Recorded, and Edited by Mike Yerardi in Baltimore, MD 2007 (Mixed by Paul Leavitt)

== Band members ==
- Bryan Barnes
- Mike Barnes
- Brent Kaminski
- Ian Dexter

== Former members ==
- Patrick Stevenson (bass)
- Mikey Lawson (bass)
- Cheyne Truitt (drums)
- Adam Thompson (drums)
- Andy Cerdan (drums)
- Paul Leavitt (drums, guitar)
- Don Bradshaw (guitar)
