= One Eleven Records =

- Genre: Various
- Country of origin: United States
- Official website: http://www.111records.com/home/index.html

One Eleven Records was an Orlando-based record label concentrating on young rock bands. Established in 2002, by Brad Fischetti, formerly of the boy band Lyte Funky Ones. The label is a part of the EastWest Records family of labels. They have a distribution deal with Warner Bros. Records.

== Current bands ==
- Canon
- The Drama Club
- Kiernan McMullan
- Devin Lima & The Cadbury Diesel
- I Am The Dream
- Inkwell (band)
- North Col
- stepsonday
- The Windupdeads

== Alumni ==
- Dearestazazel (Inactive)
- The Exit Radio (Inactive; formerly "Mashlin")
- Foreverinmotion
- Jinxed (Inactive)
- Kyle McMahon
- Mariday (No Longer Affiliated)
- The Reign of Kindo (currently with Candyrat Records)
- Rookie of the Year (No Longer Affiliated)
- Rory (Inactive)
- The Spill Canvas (Signed To Sire Records)
- Thin Dark Line (Change name to North Col)
- This Day And Age (Inactive, some members in The Reign of Kindo)

== See also ==
- List of record labels
