= Matthew 5:10 =

- ← 5:9 5:11 →
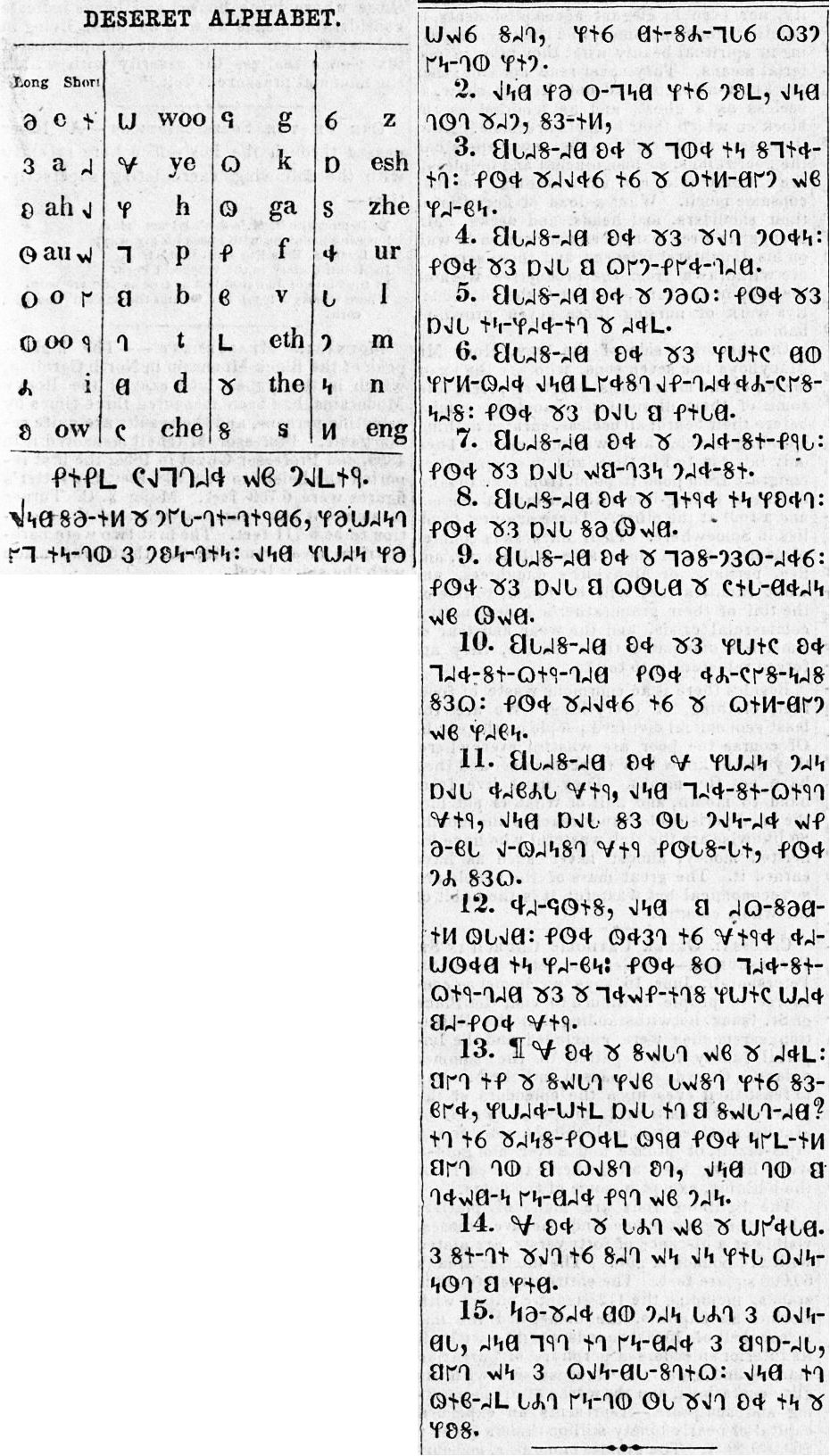
- Matthew 5:1–15 as it appears in the 16 February 1859 edition of the Deseret News.
- Book: Gospel of Matthew
- Christian Bible part: New Testament

Matthew 5:10 is the tenth verse of the fifth chapter of the Gospel of Matthew in the New Testament. It is the eighth verse of the Sermon on the Mount, and also eighth, and to some the last, of what are known as the Beatitudes.

== Content ==
In the King James Version of the Bible the text reads:

Blessed are they which are persecuted
for righteousness' sake: for
theirs is the kingdom of heaven.

The World English Bible translates the passage as:

Blessed are those who have been
persecuted for righteousness' sake,
for theirs is the Kingdom of Heaven.

The Novum Testamentum Graece text is:

μακάριοι οἱ δεδιωγμένοι
ἕνεκεν δικαιοσύνης,
ὅτι αὐτῶν ἐστιν ἡ βασιλεία τῶν οὐρανῶν.

For a collection of other versions, see BibleHub Matthew 5:10.

== Analysis ==
St. Augustine was convinced that there should actually be seven Beatitudes, as seven was considered the holy number. He thus felt that this one was not actually a separate one, but rather a rephrasing of the first Beatitude at Matthew 5:3. To Augustine this eighth Beatitude symbolized Christ rising on the eighth day, which was also the first day. As with 5:3 this verse cites the Kingdom of Heaven as the reward, also like that first verse the reward is in the present tense, the other six have it in the future. Kodjak believes that this parallelism with the first verse is to emphasize that this one is the conclusion of the Beatitudes and 5:11-12 should not be considered part of the group. Davies and Allison also agree that the verse "looks like it has been pieced together from other Beatitudes."

Gundry feels the word translated as persecuted should perhaps best be read as hounded. Hill notes that persecuted is a participle in the perfect tense which indicates that Jesus' followers had already been persecuted for their righteousness.

This verse has often been cited as an argument for Christian toleration and acceptance. John Locke prominently cited it in his A Letter Concerning Toleration. This argument was rebutted by inquisitors and others who pointed out that only those persecuted for "righteousness' sake" were to be blessed, something they did not think applied to the enemies of the church.

== Commentary from the Church Fathers ==
Chrysostom: Blessed are they who suffer persecution for righteousness’ sake, that is for virtue, for defending others, for piety, for all these things are spoken of under the title of righteousness. This follows the beatitude upon the peacemakers, that we may not be led to suppose that it is good to seek peace at all times.

Augustine: When peace is once firmly established within, whatever persecutions he who has been cast without raises, or carries on, he increases that glory which is in the sight of God.

Jerome: For righteousness’ sake He adds expressly, for many suffer persecution for their sins, and are not therefore righteous. Likewise consider how the eighth beatitude of the true circumcision is terminated by martyrdom.

Pseudo-Chrysostom: (see Phil. 3:2:3.) He said not, Blessed are they who suffer persecution of the Gentiles; that we may not suppose the blessing pronounced on those only who are persecuted for refusing to sacrifice to idols; yea, whoever suffers persecution of heretics because he will not forsake the truth is likewise blessed, seeing he suffers for righteousness. Moreover, if any of the great ones, who seem to be Christians, being corrected by you on account of his sins, shall persecute you, you are blessed with John the Baptist. For if the Prophets are truly martyrs when they are killed by their own countrymen, without doubt he who suffers in the cause of God has the reward of martyrdom though he suffers from his own people. Scripture therefore does not mention the persons of the persecutors, but only the cause of persecution, that you may learn to look, not by whom, but why you suffer.

Hilary of Poitiers: Thus, lastly, He includes those in the beatitude whose will is ready to suffer all things for Christ, who is our righteousness. For these then also is the kingdom preserved, for they are in the contempt of this world poor in spirit.

Augustine: Or, the eighth beatitude, as it were, returns to the commencement, because it shows the perfect complete character. In the first then and the eighth, the kingdom of heaven is named, for the seven go to make the perfect man, the eighth manifests and proves his perfectness, that all may be conducted to perfection by these steps.

Ambrose: Otherwise; the first kingdom of heaven was promised to the Saints, in deliverance from the body; the second, that after the resurrection they should be with Christ. For after your resurrection you shall begin to possess the earth delivered from death, and in that possession shall find comfort. Pleasure follows comfort, and Divine mercy pleasure. But on whom God has mercy, him He calls, and he whom He calls, beholds Him that called him. He who beholds God is adopted into the rights of divine birth, and then at length as the son of God is delighted with the riches of the heavenly kingdom. The first then begins, the last is perfected.

Chrysostom: Wonder not if you do not hear ‘the kingdom’ mentioned under each beatitude; for in saying shall be comforted, shall find mercy, and the rest, in all these the kingdom of heaven is tacitly understood, so that you must not look for any of the things of sense. For indeed he would not be blessed who was to be crowned with those things which depart with this life.

Preceded by Matthew 5:9	Gospel of Matthew; Chapter 5	Succeeded by Matthew 5:11
