= Matthew 5:9 =

- ← 5:8 5:10 →
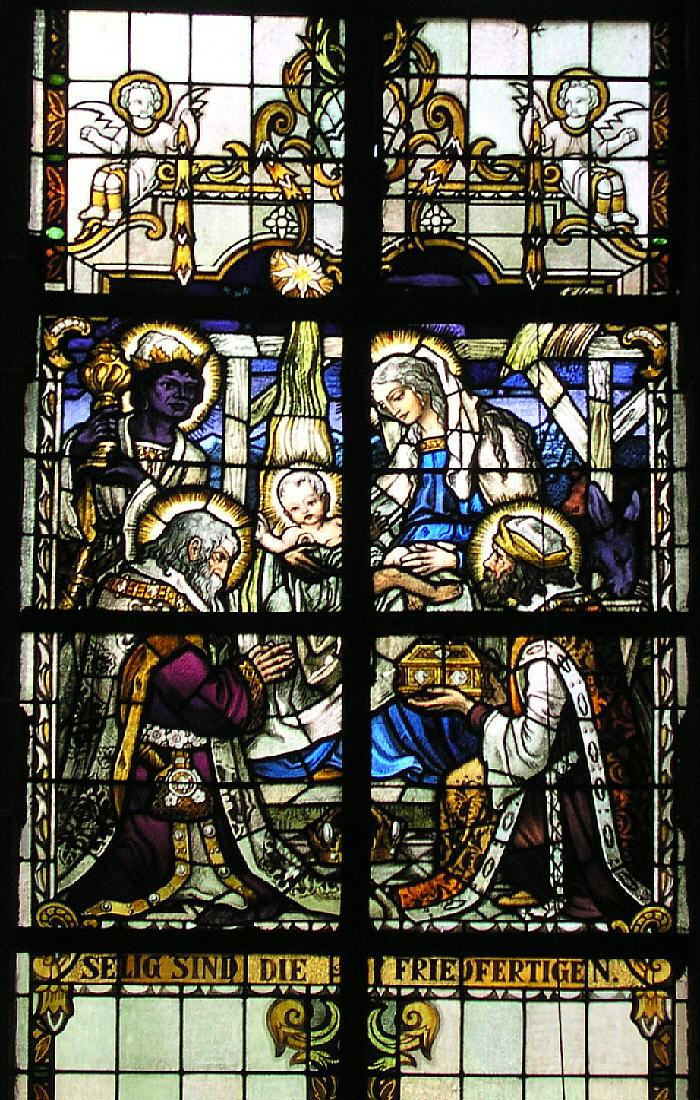
- Matthew 5:9 depicted in the window of a Trittenheim church
- Book: Gospel of Matthew
- Christian Bible part: New Testament

Matthew 5:9 is the ninth verse of the fifth chapter of the Gospel of Matthew in the New Testament. It is the seventh verse of the Sermon on the Mount, and also seventh of what are known as the Beatitudes.

== Content ==
In the King James Version of the Bible the text reads:

Blessed are the peacemakers:
for they shall be called the children of God.

The New International Version translates the passage as:

Blessed are the peacemakers,
for they will be called sons of God.

The Novum Testamentum Graece text is:

μακάριοι οἱ εἰρηνοποιοί,
ὅτι αὐτοὶ υἱοὶ Θεοῦ κληθήσονται.

For a collection of other versions see BibleHub Matthew 5:9.

== Analysis ==
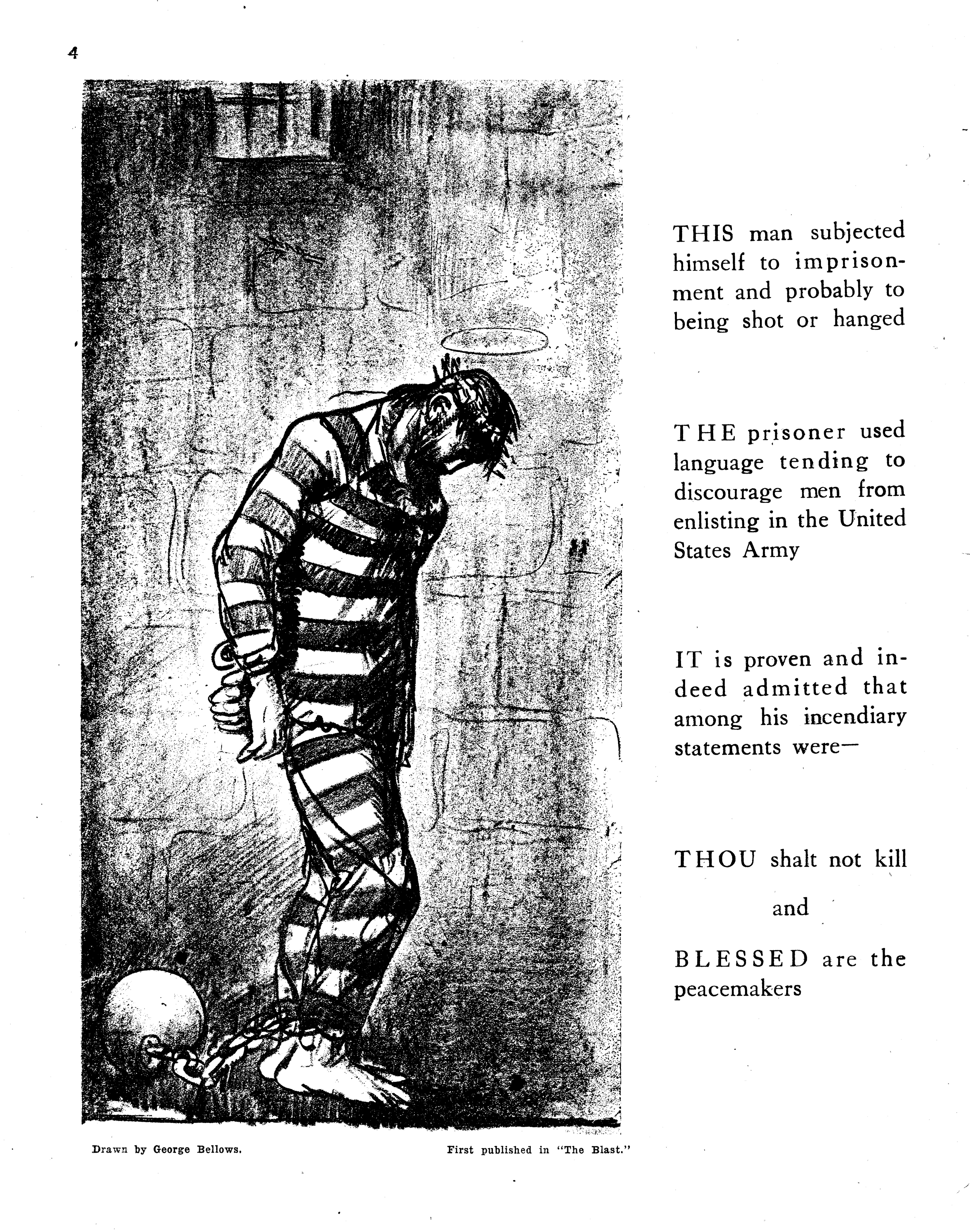
Blessed are the Peacemakers (1917) by George Bellows

David Hill notes that peacemakers is a rarely used word in the period, and that it was most commonly used to refer to Roman Emperors who had brought peace. As such this verse formed the heart of St. Augustine's argument in favour of just war, arguing that a war that brought about greater peace was justified. Clark notes that the first century was in the middle of the Pax Romana and actual wars were rare and that the verse may have referred to disputes within the community, rather than actual wars. Hare agrees that this verse isn't praise of the Pax Romana, but rather a reflection that the Roman forces had not brought harmony or cooperation and that such things were impossible to impose by force.

Davies and Allison notes that the verse can be read as supporting those who are at peace with God, but they state that most scholars believe it more likely refers to those who are reconciled with other people, a theme which recurs in Matthew. Boring believes this verse is a rejection of the proto-Zealots and a defence of why the Christian community did not participate in the First Jewish–Roman War.

Martin Luther and other early Protestant translators of the Bible preferred the translation "children of God," because they wanted to avoid any confusion as to whether Jesus was the only Son of God. "Sons of God" is, however, the more accurate translation and is used by most modern Bible translations. In several places the Gospel makes clear that the population in general can be called sons of God and Jesus frequently refers to God as "our Father" or "your Father."

Other than "blessed are the meek" in Matthew 5:5 this is perhaps the most famous of the Beatitudes. It was the personal motto of James I of England, and has been used by a number of other groups and organizations. In The Canterbury Tales "The Tale of Melibee" this verse is one of the main themes. The Beatitude is quoted three times by Shakespeare, but each time ironically. It appears a 2.1.25 of Henry VI, part 2, 2.1.50-3 of Richard III, and 5.3.138-40 of Coriolanus. The verse also plays an important role in Herman Melville's Billy Budd. The verse appears on John Marston's grave in the video game Red Dead Redemption. This verse was famously misprinted in the second edition of the Geneva Bible as "blessed are the placemakers." This was parodied in Monty Python's Life of Brian where the crowd listening to the sermon mishears it as "blessed are the cheesemakers" and then begin to debate the meaning of the phrase.

== Commentary from the Church Fathers ==
Ambrose: When you have made your inward parts clean from every spot of sin, that dissentions and contentious may not proceed from your temper, begin peace within yourself, that so you may extend it to others.

Augustine: Peace is the fixedness of order; by order, I mean an arrangement of things like and unlike giving to each its own place. And as there is no man who would not willingly have joy, so is there no man who would not have peace; since even those who go to war desire nothing more than by war to come to a glorious peace.

Jerome: The peacemakers (pacifici) are pronounced blessed, they namely who make peace first within their own hearts, then between brethren at variance. For what avails it to make peace between others, while in your own heart are wars of rebellious vices.

Augustine: The peacemakers within themselves are they who having stilled all disturbances of their spirits, having subjected them to reason, have overcome their carnal desires, and become the kingdom of God. There all things are so disposed, that that which is most chief and excellent in man, governs those parts which we have in common with the brutes, though they struggle against it; nay even that in man which is excellent is subjected to a yet greater, namely, the very Truth, the Son of God. For it would not be able to govern what is inferior to it, if it were not subject to what is above it. And this is the peace which is given on earth to men of good will.

Augustine: No man can attain in this life that there be not in his members a law resisting the law of his mind. But the peacemakers attain thus far by overcoming the lusts of the flesh, that in time they come to a most perfect peace.

Pseudo-Chrysostom: The peacemakers with others are not only those who reconcile enemies, but those who unmindful of wrongs cultivate peace. That peace only is blessed which is lodged in the heart, and does not consist only in words. And they who love peace, they are the sons of peace.

Hilary of Poitiers: The blessedness of the peacemakers is the reward of adoption, they shall be called the sons of God. For God is our common parent, and no other way can we pass into His family than by living in brotherly love together.

Chrysostom: Or, if the peacemakers are they who do not contend one with another, but reconcile those that are at strife, they are rightly called the sons of God, seeing this was the chief employment of the Only-begotten Son, to reconcile things separated, to give peace to things at war.

Augustine: Or, because peace is then perfect when there is no where any opposition, the peacemakers are called the sons of God, because nothing resists God, and the children ought to bear the likeness of their Father.

Glossa Ordinaria: The peacemakers have thus the place of highest honour, inasmuch as he who is called the king's son, is the highest in the king's house. This beatitude is placed the seventh in order, because in the sabbath shall be given the repose of true peace, the six ages being passed away.

Preceded by Matthew 5:8	Gospel of Matthew; Chapter 5	Succeeded by Matthew 5:10
