= Matthew 5:7 =

- ← 5:6 5:8 →
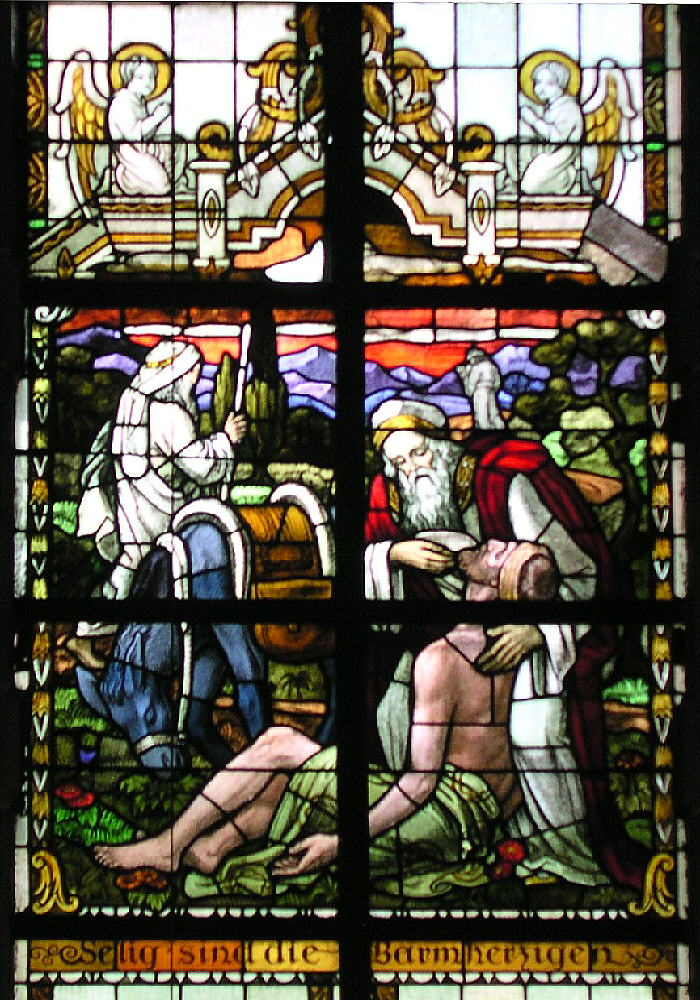
- Matthew 5:7 depicted in the window of a Trittenheim church
- Book: Gospel of Matthew
- Christian Bible part: New Testament

Matthew 5:7 is the seventh verse of the fifth chapter of the Gospel of Matthew in the New Testament. It is the fifth verse of the Sermon on the Mount, and also the fifth of what are known as the Beatitudes.

== Content ==
In the King James Version of the Bible, the text reads:

Blessed are the merciful:
for they shall obtain mercy.

The World English Bible translates the passage as:

Blessed are the merciful,
for they shall obtain mercy.

The Novum Testamentum Graece text is:

μακάριοι οἱ ἐλεήμονες,
ὅτι αὐτοὶ ἐλεηθήσονται.

For a collection of other versions see BibleHub: Matthew 5:7.

== Analysis ==
Like Matthew 5:5 this verse has no parallel in Luke's Sermon on the Plain. New Testament scholar Robert H. Gundry therefore suggests that this fairly straightforward construction was probably thus a creation by the author of Matthew's Gospel. The theme is an obvious one for Matthew to choose: Eduard Schweizer notes that "mercy is the focal point of Matthew's message".

The form – "blessed" (Greek: makarios) + subject + "that" (hoti) + cause – can be found in Genesis 30:13 (also in Tobit 13:16), whereas the eschatological orientation is similar to Daniel 12:12 (also 1 Enoch 58:2–3). Other ancient literature can attest the grouping together of several beatitudes (cf. 4Q525 2; 2 Enoch 52:1–14) and the use of third person plural address (cf. Pss. Sol. 17:44; Tobit 13:14). The Greek word makarios cannot adequately be rendered as "blessed" nor "happy", as it is rather 'a term of congratulation and recommendation' which can also mean "satisfied" (as in Psalm 1:1).

The Greek phrase οἱ ἐλεήμονες, hoi eleēmones, "the merciful" or "the compassionate" (Hebrews 2:17; Homer, Odyssey, Book 5, line 191) does not merely refer to the 'negative quality' ("not dealing harshly, not inflicting punishment when due, sparing an animal or a fellow-man some unnecessary labor"), but also 'active kindness to the destitute and to any who are in trouble' (cf. Matthew 9:27; Matthew 15:22; Matthew 17:15; Mark 5:19).

This verse, according to Gundry, marks the beginning of the second quartet of Beatitudes. The first four are all about private attitudes and conditions, the second four are about relations between people. Gundry feels the first four reflect the persecuted conditions of the disciples and the second four show the righteous behaviour that led to this persecution.

== Commentary from the Church Fathers ==
Glossa Ordinaria: Justice and mercy are so united, that the one ought to be mingled with the other; justice without mercy is cruelty; mercy without justice, profusion—hence He goes on to the one from the other.

Saint Remigius: The merciful (misericors) is he who has a sad heart; he counts others' misery his own, and is sad at their grief as at his own.

Jerome: Mercy here is not said only of alms, but is in every sin of a brother, if we bear one another's burdens.

Augustine: He pronounces those blessed who succour the wretched, because they are rewarded in being themselves delivered from all misery; as it follows, for they shall obtain mercy.

Hilary of Poitiers: So greatly is God pleased with our feelings of benevolence towards all men, that He will bestow His own mercy only on the merciful.

Chrysostom: The reward here seems at first to be only an equal return; but indeed it is much more; for human mercy and divine mercy are not to be put on an equality.

Glossa Ordinaria: Justly is mercy dealt out to the merciful, that they should receive more than they had deserved; and as he who has more than enough receives more than he who has only enough, so the glory of mercy is greater than of the things hitherto mentioned.

== Sources ==
- Allison, Dale C. Jr. (2007). "57. Matthew". In Barton, John; Muddiman, John (eds.). The Oxford Bible Commentary (first (paperback) ed.). Oxford University Press. pp. 844–886. ISBN 978-0199277186.
- Coogan, Michael David (2007). Coogan, Michael David; Brettler, Marc Zvi; Newsom, Carol Ann; Perkins, Pheme (eds.). The New Oxford Annotated Bible with the Apocryphal/Deuterocanonical Books: New Revised Standard Version, Issue 48 (Augmented 3rd ed.). Oxford University Press. ISBN 9780195288810.
- France, R. T. (1994). "Matthew". In Carson, D. A.; France, R. T.; Motyer, J. A.; Wenham, G. J. (eds.). New Bible Commentary: 21st Century Edition (4, illustrated, reprint, revised ed.). Inter-Varsity Press. pp. 904–945. ISBN 9780851106489.

Preceded by Matthew 5:6	Gospel of Matthew; Chapter 5	Succeeded by Matthew 5:8
