= Matthew 5:8 =

- ← 5:7 5:9 →
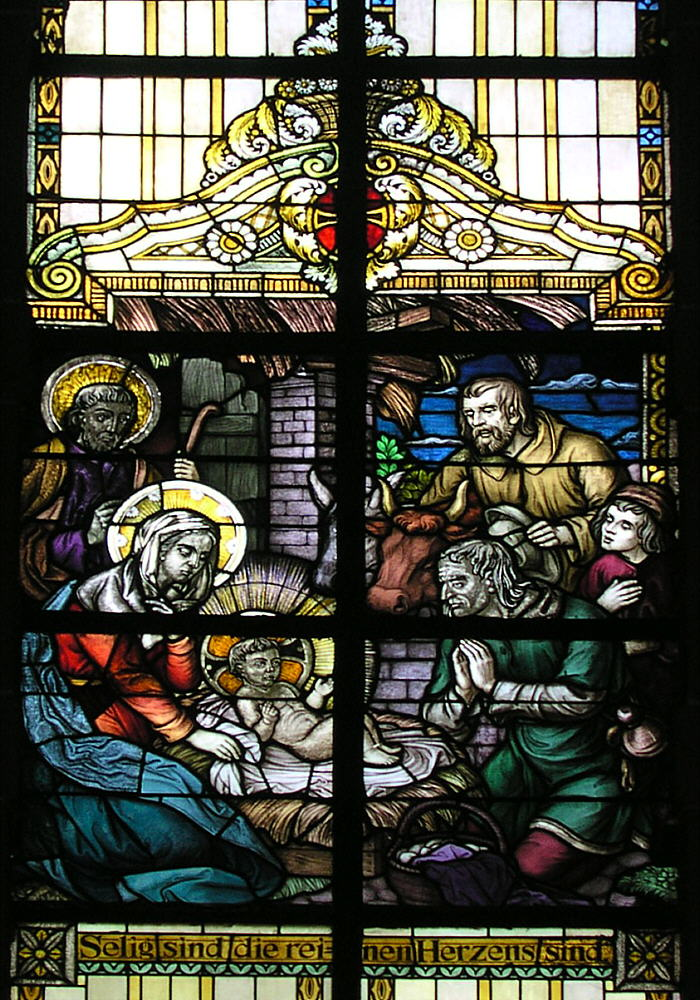
- Matthew 5:8 depicted in the window of a Trittenheim church
- Book: Gospel of Matthew
- Christian Bible part: New Testament

Matthew 5:8 is the eighth verse of the fifth chapter of the Gospel of Matthew in the New Testament. It is the sixth verse of the Sermon on the Mount, and also sixth of what are known as the Beatitudes.

== Content ==
In the King James Version of the Bible the text reads:

Blessed are the pure in heart:
for they shall see God.

The World English Bible translates the passage as:

Blessed are the pure in heart,
for they shall see God.

The Novum Testamentum Graece text is:

μακάριοι οἱ καθαροὶ τῇ καρδίᾳ,
ὅτι αὐτοὶ τὸν Θεὸν ὄψονται.

For a collection of other versions see BibleHub Matthew 5:8.

== Analysis ==
This verse is generally believed to have been taken from Psalm 24:3–5 either by Jesus or the author of Matthew who was adding this verse that is not found in Luke. A number of scholars have been certain that there were originally seven Beatitudes, as seven was a holy number. Since this verse is so similar to the Psalm some believe it was the one incorrectly integrated into the Sermon on the Mount. Hill speculates that the verse could actually be a mistranslation of Isaiah 61:1, and should have read "only the contrite will see God".

The form – "blessed" (Greek: makarios) + subject + "that" (hoti) + cause – can be found in Genesis 30:13 (also in Tobit 13:16), whereas the eschatological orientation is similar to Daniel 12:12 (also 1 Enoch 58:2–3). Other ancient literature can attest the grouping together of several beatitudes (cf. 4Q525 2; 2 Enoch 52:1–14) and the use of third person plural address (cf. Pss. Sol. 17:44; Tobit 13:14). The Greek word makarios cannot adequately be rendered as "blessed" nor "happy", as it is rather 'a term of congratulation and recommendation', that can also mean "satisfied" (as in Psalm 1:1).

The word purity is not believed to refer to one who was ritually cleansed, but rather to internal spiritual purity as noted by the "in heart" addition. At the time the heart was literally seen as the seat of emotion and the soul, though today the verse is read metaphorically. Davies and Allison read a pure heart as being one that is simple and undivided in allegiance.

== Commentary from the Church Fathers ==
Ambrose: The merciful loses the benefit of his mercy, unless he shows it from a pure heart; for if he seeks to have whereof to boast, he loses the fruit of his deeds; the next that follows therefore is, Blessed are the pure in heart.

Glossa Ordinaria: Purity of heart comes properly in the sixth place, because on the sixth day man was created in the image of God, which image was shrouded by sin, but is formed anew in pure hearts by grace. It follows rightly the before-mentioned graces, because if they be not there, a clean heart is not created in a man.

Chrysostom: By the pure are here meant those who possess a perfect goodness, conscious to themselves of no evil thoughts, or again those who live in such temperance as is mostly necessary to seeing God according to that of St. Paul, Follow peace with all men, and holiness, without which no man shall see God. For as there are many merciful, yet unchaste, to show that mercy alone is not enough, he adds this concerning purity.

Jerome: The pure is known by purity of heart, for the temple of God cannot be impure.

Pseudo-Chrysostom: He who in thought and deed fulfils all righteousness, sees God in his heart, for righteousness is an image of God, for God is righteousness. So far as any one has rescued himself from evil, and works things that are good, so far does he see God, either hardly, or fully, or sometimes, or always, according to the capabilities of human nature. But in that world to come the pure in heart shall see God face to face, not in a glass, and in enigma as here.

Augustine: They are foolish who seek to see God with the bodily eye, seeing He is seen only by the heart, as it is elsewhere written, In singleness of heart seek ye Him; (Wisd. 1:1.) the single heart is the same as is here called the pure heart.

Augustine: But if spiritual eyes in the spiritual body shall be able only to see so much as they we now have can see, undoubtedly God will not be able to be seen of them.

Augustine: This seeing God is the reward of faith; to which end our hearts are made pure by faith, as it is written, cleansing their hearts by faith; (Acts 15:9.) but the present verse proves this still more strongly.

Augustine: No one seeing God can be alive with the life men have on earth, or with these our bodily senses. Unless one die altogether out of this life, either by totally departing from the body, or so alienated from carnal lusts that he may truly say with the Apostle, whether in the body or out of the body, I cannot tell, he is not translated that he should see this vision.

Glossa Ordinaria: The reward of these is greater than the reward of the first; being not merely to dine in the King's court, but further to see His face.

== See also ==
- Isaiah 61
- Psalm 24

== Sources ==
- Allison, Dale C. Jr. (2007). "57. Matthew". In Barton, John; Muddiman, John (eds.). The Oxford Bible Commentary (first (paperback) ed.). Oxford University Press. pp. 844–886. ISBN 978-0199277186.
- Coogan, Michael David (2007). Coogan, Michael David; Brettler, Marc Zvi; Newsom, Carol Ann; Perkins, Pheme (eds.). The New Oxford Annotated Bible with the Apocryphal/Deuterocanonical Books: New Revised Standard Version, Issue 48 (Augmented 3rd ed.). Oxford University Press. ISBN 9780195288810.
- France, R. T. (1994). "Matthew". In Carson, D. A.; France, R. T.; Motyer, J. A.; Wenham, G. J. (eds.). New Bible Commentary: 21st Century Edition (4, illustrated, reprint, revised ed.). Inter-Varsity Press. pp. 904–945. ISBN 9780851106489.

Preceded by Matthew 5:7	Gospel of Matthew; Chapter 5	Succeeded by Matthew 5:9
