= Matthew 5:11 =

- ← 5:10 5:12 →
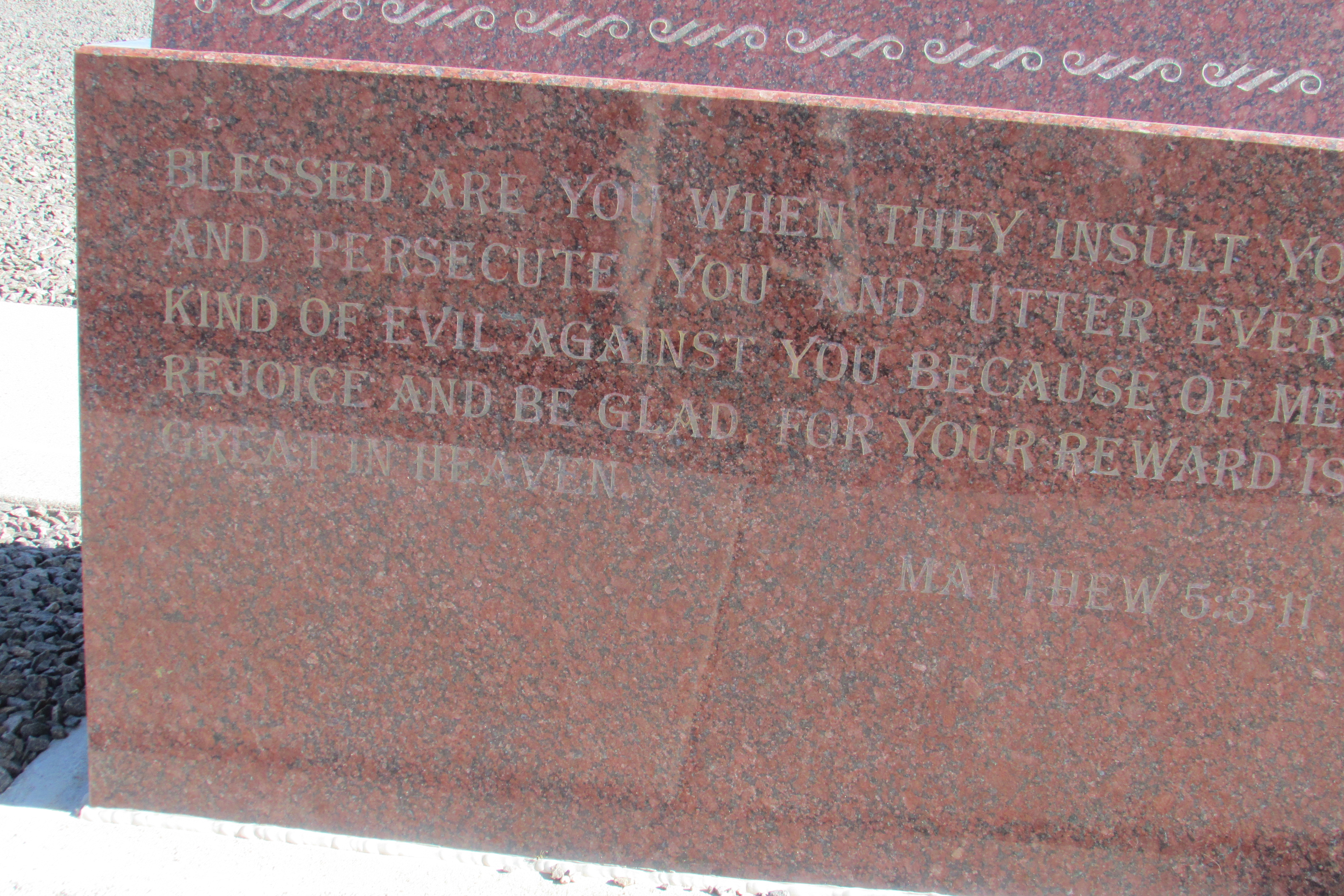
- Text of Matthew 5:11 on the Beatitudes at Our Lady of Peace Shrine, along I-80 in Pine Bluffs, Wyoming (2016).
- Book: Gospel of Matthew
- Christian Bible part: New Testament

Matthew 5:11 is the eleventh verse of the fifth chapter of the Gospel of Matthew in the New Testament. It is the ninth verse of the Sermon on the Mount. Some commentators consider this verse to be the beginning of the last Beatitude, but others disagree, seeing it as more of an expansion on the eighth and final Beatitude in the previous verse.

== Content ==
In the King James Version of the Bible, the text reads:

Blessed are ye, when men shall revile you,
and persecute you, and shall say all manner
of evil against you falsely, for my sake.

The World English Bible translates the passage as:

"Blessed are you when people reproach
you, persecute you, and say all kinds of
evil against you falsely, for my sake.

The Novum Testamentum Graece text reads:

μακάριοί ἐστε ὅταν ὀνειδίσωσινὑμᾶς
καὶ διώξωσιν καὶ εἴπωσιν πᾶν
πονηρὸν καθ’ ὑμῶν ψευδόμενοι ἕνεκεν ἐμοῦ.

For a collection of other versions see BibleHub Matthew 5:11.

== Analysis ==
While this verse begins with the same "blessed are" opening of the previous eight Beatitudes it varies from them in structure. It shifts from the third to the second person and abandons the simple virtue/reward structure. It is thus generally not seen as a ninth Beatitude, but as a commentary on the eighth Beatitude directed to the disciples. Schweizer feels this verse and the next were a late addition clarifying the previous verse. It expands on what type of persecution will be faced, and also is more explicit on the eventual reward. France feels it might also integrate elements from Isaiah 51:7. It also is somewhat similar to Luke 6:22, and both may be drawn from the same original source.

This verse is also seen to give important information about the Christians at the time the Gospel was written. The discussion of the persecution of Christians, which did not begin until some time after Jesus' crucifixion, to most scholars is evidence that this is the period the Gospel of Matthew was written in. Other believers feel that Jesus is merely accurately predicting the events that will unfold after his death. The Gospel of Matthew refers to only verbal attacks, and this was likely the main form of abuse suffered by the Christians at this time. Schweizer notes that slander and insults were of great importance in that era. Verbal attacks meant that the Christians were ostracized from their communities, and in that era community support was essential to survival. Gundry notes that Luke has excommunication as one of the forms of persecution, perhaps indicating the differences in situation between the writings of the two Gospels.

The verse is careful to note that the persecuted are blessed only when they are reproached and slandered falsely. Schweizer notes that the early Christian communities had problem with impostors only pretending to be Christian who might have been worthy of reproach by others.

== Commentary from the Church Fathers ==
Rabanus Maurus: The preceding blessings were general; He now begins to address His discourse to them that were present, foretelling them the persecutions which they should suffer for His name.

Augustine: It may be asked, what difference there is between ‘they shall revile you’, and ‘shall speak all manner of evil of you;’ to revile, it may be said, being but to speak evil of. But a reproach thrown with insult in the face of one present is a different thing from a slander cast on the character of the absent. To persecute includes both open violence and secret snares.

Pseudo-Chrysostom: But if it be true that he who offers a cup of water does not lose his reward, consequently he who has been wronged but by a single word of calumny, shall not be without a reward. But that the reviled may have a claim to this blessing, two things are necessary, it must be false, and it must be for God's sake; otherwise he has not the reward of this blessing; therefore He adds, falsely for my sake.

Augustine: This I suppose was added because of those who wish to boast of persecutions and evil reports of their shame, and therefore claim to belong to Christ because many evil things are said of them; but either these are true, or when false yet they are not for Christ's sake.

Gregory the Great: What hurt can you receive when men detract from you, though you have no defence but only your own conscience? But as we ought not to stir up wilfully the tongues of slanderers, lest they perish for their slander, yet when their own malice has instigated them, we should endure it with equanimity, that our merit may be added to. Rejoice, He says, and exult, for your reward is abundant in heaven.

Preceded by Matthew 5:10	Gospel of Matthew; Chapter 5	Succeeded by Matthew 5:12
