= Matthew 4:24 =

- ← 4:23 4:25 →
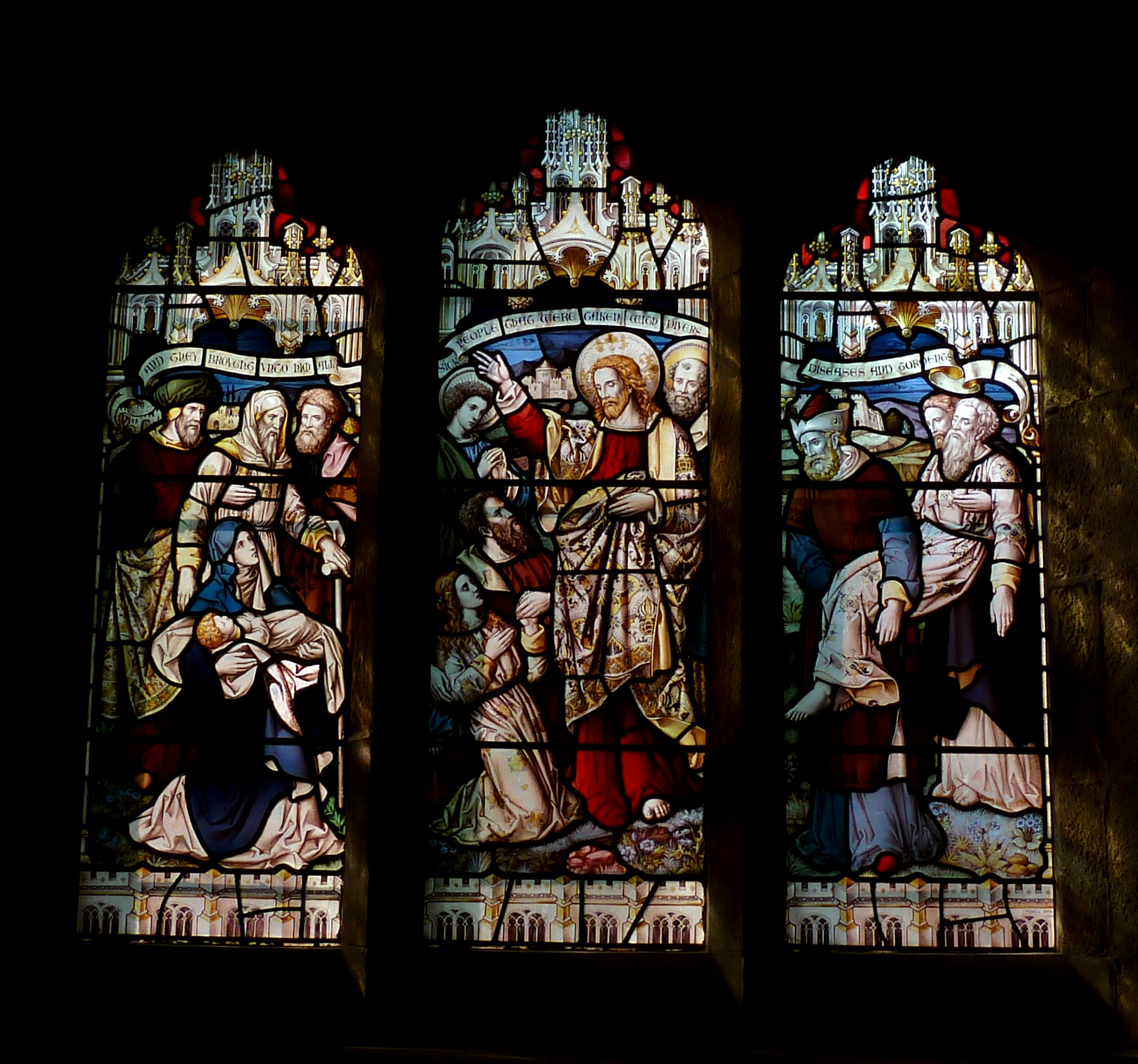
- Matthew 4:24 illustrated in the stained glass on a three-light window on the south aisle, in Church of St Thomas the Apostle, Killinghall, North Yorkshire, England (church completed in 1880).
- Book: Gospel of Matthew
- Christian Bible part: New Testament

Matthew 4:24 is the twenty-fourth verse of the fourth chapter of the Gospel of Matthew in the New Testament. This verse is part of a brief summary of and introduction to Jesus' ministry in Galilee, which will be recounted in the next several chapters. This verse relates Jesus' fame "throughout all Syria" (Greek: εἰς ὅλην τὴν Συρίαν, eis holēn tēn Syrian) and summarizes his work of healing.

== Text ==
The original Koine Greek, according to Westcott and Hort, reads:

και απηλθεν η ακοη αυτου εις ολην την συριαν και προσηνεγκαν αυτω παντας
τους κακως εχοντας ποικιλαις νοσοις και βασανοις συνεχομενους δαιμονιζομενους
και σεληνιαζομενους και παραλυτικους και εθεραπευσεν αυτους

In the King James Version of the Bible, the text reads:

And his fame went throughout all Syria: and they brought unto him all sick people that
were taken with divers diseases and torments, and those which were possessed with devils,
and those which were lunatick, and those that had the palsy; and he healed them.

The World English Bible translates the passage as:

The report about him went out into all of Syria. They brought to him all who
were sick, afflicted with various diseases and torments, possessed with
demons, epileptics, and paralytics; and he healed them.

For a collection of other versions see Matthew 4:24 at BibleGateway.com

== Syria ==
The Roman province of Syria covered a huge area. American Theologian Albert Barnes interprets "Syria" as "the general name for the country lying between the Euphrates on the east, and the Mediterranean on the west; and between Mount Taurus on the north, and Arabia on the south. English biblical scholar R. T. France suggests that the author of Matthew's gospel was likely to have been using the Old Testament meaning, which limited it to the area immediately to the north and northeast of Israel. Eduard Schweizer notes that one late manuscript has synoria, region, in place of Syria, a meaning that would also make the passage more credible. Syria is often considered to be the location where the author of Matthew wrote his gospel.

Mark's Gospel does not mention Syria in the parallel text: His fame spread throughout all the region around Galilee; similarly in Luke's Gospel, News of Him went out through all the surrounding region.

== Healing the sick ==
David Hill notes that the general understanding of disease among the Jewish community at the time was that it was in atonement for sin. Thus Jesus' healing power is an aspect of his ability to grant forgiveness of sins, as mentioned in Matthew 1:21.

== Commentary from the Church Fathers ==
Glossa Ordinaria: (ap. Anselm.) Because preachers should have good testimony from those who are without, lest if their life is open to censure, their preaching be contemned, he adds, And the fame of him went abroad through all Syria.

Rabanus Maurus: Syria here is all the region from Euphrates to the Great sea, from Cappadocia to Egypt, in which is the country of Palestine, inhabited by Jews.

Chrysostom: Observe the reserve of the Evangelist; he does not give an account of any one of the various cases of healing, but passes in one brief phrase an abundance of miracles, they brought to him all their sick.

Remigius: By these he would have us understand various but slighter diseases; but when he says, seized with divers sicknesses and torments, he would have those understood, of whom it is subjoined, and who had dæmons.

Glossa Ordinaria: ‘Sickness’ means a lasting ailment; ‘torment’ is an acute pain, as pleurisy, and such like; they who had dæmons are they who were tormented by the dæmons.

Remigius: ‘Lunatics’ are so-called from the moon; for as it waxes in its monthly seasons they are tormented.

Jerome: Not really smitten by the moon, but who were believed to be so through the subtlety of the dæmons, who by observing the seasons of the moon, sought to bring an evil report against the creature, that it might redound to the blasphemy of the Creator.

Augustine: (De Civ. Dei, xxi. 6.) Dæmons are enticed to take up their abode in many creatures, (created not by themselves but God,) by delights adapted to their various natures; not that they are animals, drawn by meats; but spirits attracted by signs which agree with each one's taste.

Rabanus Maurus: Paralytics are those whose bodies have their nerves slackened or resolved from a Greek word, signifying this.

Pseudo-Chrysostom: In some places it is, He cured many; but here, He cured them, meaning ‘all;’ as a new physician first entering a town cures all who come to him. to beget a good opinion concerning himself.

Chrysostom: He requires no direct profession of faith from them, both because He had not yet given them any proofs of His miraculous power, and because in bringing their sick from far they had shown no small faith.

Preceded by Matthew 4:23	Gospel of Matthew; Chapter 4	Succeeded by Matthew 4:25
