= Matthew 4:25 =

- ← 4:24 5:1 →
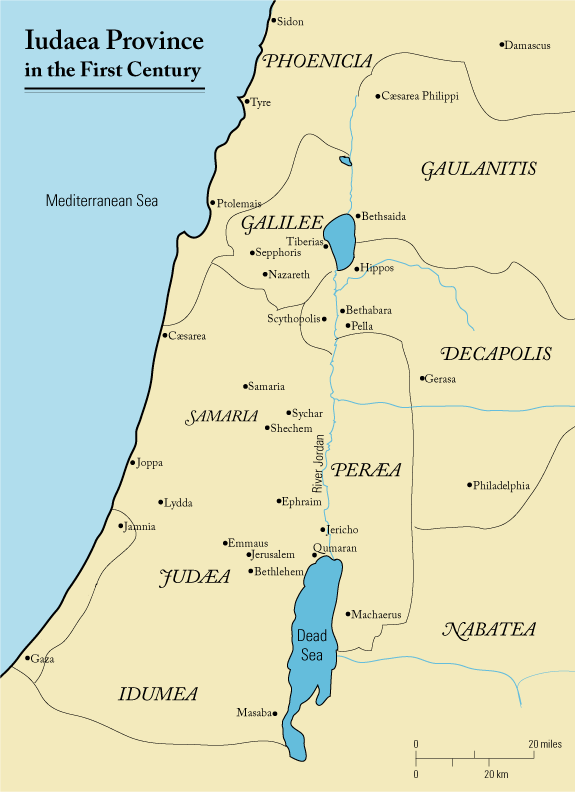
- 1st century AD Palestine, showing the areas mentioned in this verse
- Book: Gospel of Matthew
- Christian Bible part: New Testament

Matthew 4:25 is the twenty-fifth, and final, verse of the fourth chapter of the Gospel of Matthew in the New Testament. This verse is part of a brief summary of and introduction to Jesus' ministry in Galilee, which will be recounted in the next several chapters. This verse lists the many locations from which people came to see Jesus.

== Content ==
The original Koine Greek, according to Westcott and Hort, reads:

και ηκολουθησαν αυτω οχλοι πολλοι απο της γαλιλαιας και δεκαπολεως
και ιεροσολυμων και ιουδαιας και περαν του ιορδανου

In the King James Version of the Bible the text reads:

And there followed him great multitudes of people from Galilee, and from
Decapolis, and from Jerusalem, and from Judaea, and from beyond Jordan.

The World English Bible translates the passage as:

Great multitudes from Galilee, Decapolis, Jerusalem,
Judea and from beyond the Jordan followed him.

For a collection of other versions see BibleHub Matthew 4:25

== Analysis ==
This verse reaffirms the author of Matthew's affinity for geography, and especially place names, as previously seen throughout Matthew 2 and in Matthew 4:13. This verse lists the places from which people came to follow Jesus. These are:

- Galilee, Jesus' homeland where he is preaching at this time
- The Decapolis, literally "the Ten Towns", largely Gentile Greek cities
- Jerusalem, the political and spiritual capital of the region
- Judaea, the heartland of the Jews to the south of Galilee
- Peraea, an area to the east of the Jordan River

With the mention of Syria in the previous verse this covers the entirety of the Holy Land, with the notable exception of Samaria. Throughout his gospel the author of Matthew seems to view that area in a negative light, as in Matthew 10:5.

== Commentary from the Church Fathers ==
Rabanus Maurus: crowds that followed Him consisted of four sorts of men, some followed for the heavenly teaching as disciples, some for the curing of their diseases, some from the reports concerning Him alone, and curiosity to find whether they were true; others from envy, wishing to catch Him in some matter that they might accuse Him. Mystically, Syria is interpreted ‘lofty,’ Galilee, ‘turning:’ or ‘a wheel;’ that is, the Devil and the world; the Devil is both proud and always turned round to the bottom; the world in which the fame of Christ went abroad through preaching: the dæmoniacs are the idolaters; the lunatics, the unstable; the paralytics, the slow and careless.

Glossa Ordinaria: The crowds that follow the Lord, are they of the Church, which is spiritually designated by Galilee, passing to virtuousness; Decapolis is he who keeps the Ten Commandments; Jerusalem and Judæa, he who is enlightened by the vision of peace and confession; and beyond Jordan, he who having passed the waters of Baptism enters the land of promise.

Saint Remigius: Or, they follow the Lord from Galilee, that is, from the unstable world; from Decapolis, (the country of ten towns,) signifying those who break the Ten Commandments; and from Jerusalem, because before it was preserved unhurt in peace; and from Jordan, that is, from the confession of the Devil; and from beyond Jordan, they who were first planted in paganism, but passing the water of Baptism came to Christ.

Preceded by Matthew 4:24	Gospel of Matthew; Chapter 4	Succeeded by Matthew 5:1
