= Matthew 5:1–2 =

- ← 4:25 5:3 →
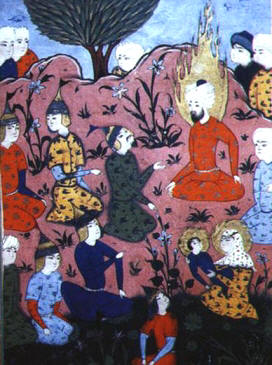
- Persian miniature of the Sermon on the Mount.
- Book: Gospel of Matthew
- Christian Bible part: New Testament

Matthew 5:1 and Matthew 5:2 are the first two verses of the fifth chapter of the Gospel of Matthew in the New Testament. The verses introduce the Sermon on the Mount that will be recited in the next several chapters. The previous chapter concluded with large crowds "from Galilee, and from the Decapolis, Jerusalem, Judea, and beyond the Jordan" who followed Jesus to witness him healing: these verses present Jesus as seeing the crowds and going up onto a mountain to begin teaching.

== Content ==
The original Koine Greek, according to Westcott and Hort, reads:

1:ιδων δε τους οχλους ανεβη εις το ορος και
καθισαντος αυτου προσηλθαν [αυτω] οι μαθηται αυτου
2:και ανοιξας το στομα αυτου εδιδασκεν αυτους λεγων

In the King James Version of the Bible, the text reads:

1: And seeing the multitudes, he went up into a mountain:
and when he was set, his disciples came unto him:
2: And he opened his mouth, and taught them, saying,

The World English Bible translates the passage as:

1: Seeing the multitudes, he went up onto the mountain.
When he had sat down, his disciples came to him.
2: He opened his mouth and taught them, saying,

In other English translations, the Geneva Bible, New International Version (NIV) and God's Word Translation refer to "a mountain", whereas the Revised Standard Version and the New American Standard Bible refer to "the mountain". (Note: For a collection of other versions see BibleHub Matthew 5:1-2.) Protestant theologian Heinrich Meyer classifies interpretations of το ορος (to oros, "the mountain") as

- indefinite, meaning "a mountain" (Martin Luther, Kuinoel (de:Christian Gottlieb Kühnöl)): in Meyer's view, "always incorrect"
- generic, meaning "the hilly district, or on the heights" (Ebrard, Friedrich Bleek)
- specific, meaning "the hill", the one which is situated in the place where Jesus saw the crowds (Euthymios Zigabenos, Meyer's own preference), and
- other referential explanations, meaning "the well-known hill" (Fritzsche, de Wette) or "the holy hill" (Ewald), "the Sinai of the New Testament" (Franz Delitzsch).

The NIV in verse 2 reads "and he began to teach them" without using the phrase "opened his mouth.

== Symbolism of the mountain ==
The reference to going up a mountain prior to preaching is considered by many to be a reference to Moses on Mount Sinai. Lapide feels that the clumsy phrasing implies that this verse is a transliteration from the Hebrew, and that it was an exact replica of a passage describing Moses. Boring notes that the reference to Jesus sitting may be an allusion to Deuteronomy 9:9, where in some translations Moses is described as sitting on Mount Sinai. St. Augustine in his commentary on the Sermon on the Mount supported the Moses parallel. He argued that this symbolism shows that Jesus is giving a new set of precepts to supplement those of Moses. In his later writings, such as the Reply to Faustus, he backs away from this view.

Other scholars reject the link with Moses. Commentary writer David Hill disagrees, arguing that if this had been intended as a reference to Exodus then the author of Matthew would have made the links far clearer. Hare also takes a different view. He reads the sequence of Jesus sitting, the disciples approaching, and then talking as depicting Jesus regally with the disciples approaching him as would subjects at a royal court. To Hare the reference to a mountain might thus be a reference to Mount Zion of David rather than of Sinai.

There are mountains in both Lower and Upper Galilee and several large hills in the region to the west of the Sea of Galilee. The Golan Heights lies to the east of the Sea of Galilee. There are a number of hills that have traditionally been claimed as the site of the sermon, but the best known is the one today known as the Mount of Beatitudes. A number of scholars do not feel "the mountain" is the most accurate understanding of the phrase. Gundry feels it could mean "mountainous region", while France feels it should be read as "went up into the hills." Nolland notes that "mountainous region' is another option for translating the phrase, though he believes "a mountain" is still the most accurate translation. Boring notes that this move to the mountains has been read as Jesus fleeing the crowds mentioned in Matthew 4:25. Many arguments about the nature of Jesus' mission and his psychology have been read into this avoidance of crowds. Boring disagrees, and believes the move to the hills is present only as a Mosaic parallel.

The introduction to the Sermon on the Plain also has Jesus go up into a mountain in Luke 6:12, but he goes there merely to pray and descends before beginning his preaching. Some scholars have tried to reconcile the two accounts, with one proposal being that the sermon was delivered on a flat plain part-way up a mountain. Davies and Allison reject such an approach, as Luke made clear that Jesus descended prior to the speech. Davies and Allison also consider such reconciliation unnecessary as the sermon is a general summary of Jesus' teachings and was likely preached on many occasions.

== Starting of the sermon ==
This verse is the first place where the word disciples appears in the Gospel of Matthew. Its exact meaning is unclear. Some feel that it refers only to the small group of Jesus' followers, and that the Sermon was only directed to them. Albright and Mann support this view. Gundry feels that, at least in this verse, disciples has a much broader meaning and refers to any who came to hear Jesus, he feels the word is used interchangeably in this section with crowds. Matthew 7:28 makes clear the general crowd was listening to the Sermon. That Jesus sits down might indicate this is not meant to be a public address. Hill notes that Jewish leaders in schools and synagogues would always sit when delivering a lesson. Lachs disagrees with this, arguing that while sitting was a standard teaching position in the later half of the first century, in the early part of the century the tradition was to always stand while teaching to the Torah. Luke makes no mention of whether Jesus is sitting or standing. The traditional view, as depicted in art, is that the disciples sat near Jesus, with the crowd beyond but still able to hear. Lapide feels that Jesus' sermon is directed at three circles of listeners, his disciples, the crowd, and the world in general. Chrysostom was of the opinion that the sermon itself was delivered to the disciples, but that it was intended for wider distribution, which is why it was written down.

"Opened his mouth" was a common Semitic expression at the time, well attested in literature from the period. In the New Testament it also appears Acts 8:35 and 10:34. Anglican churchman Henry Alford sees these words as "a solemn introduction" used to introduce "a discourse or advice of importance". Gundry suggests that this is a reference to Matthew 4:3, which mentions "every word out of the mouth of God". Gundry thus feels that this turn of phrase is meant to imply that the Sermon are words spoken by God. Luke's Sermon on the Plain opens with Jesus "lifting up his eyes", and the two phrases might be related.

Harrington notes that this is one of only two times in the Gospel that Jesus is described as teaching. Both reference the Sermon on the Mount, with the other reference at Matthew 7:29. Though Nolland notes that Matthew does not contain the same extensive John/Jesus parallels as Mark.

== Commentary from the Church Fathers ==
Pseudo-Chrysostom: Every man in his own trade or profession rejoices when he sees an opportunity of exercising it; the carpenter if he sees a goodly tree desires to have it to cut down to employ his skill on, and the Priest when he sees a full Church, his heart rejoices, he is glad of the occasion to teach. So the Lord seeing a great congregation of people was stirred to teach them.

Augustine: Or He may be thought to have sought to shun the thickest crowd, and to have ascended the mountain that He might speak to His disciples alone.

Chrysostom: By not choosing His seat in the city, and the market place, but on a mountain in a desert, He has taught us to do nothing with ostentation, and to depart from crowds, above all when we are to be employed in philosophy, or in speaking of serious things.

Saint Remigius: This should be known, that the Lord had three places of retirement that we read of, the ship, the mountain, and the desert; to one of these He was wont to withdraw whenever He was pressed by the multitude.

Jerome: Some of the less learned brethren suppose the Lord to have spoken what follows from the Mount of Olives, which is by no means the case; what went before and what follows fixes the place in Galilee. Mount Tabor, we may suppose, or any other high mountain.

Chrysostom: He ascended a mountain, first, that He might fulfil the prophecy of Esaias, Get thee up into a mountain; (Isaiah 40:9) secondly, to show that as well he who teaches, as he who hears the righteousness of God, should stand on a high ground of spiritual virtues; for none can abide in the valley and speak from a mountain. If thou stand on the earth, speak of the earth; if thou speak of heaven, stand in heaven. Or, He ascended into the mountain to show that all who would learn the mysteries of the truth should go up into the Mount of the Church of which the Prophet speaks, The hill of God is a hill of fatness (Psalm 68:15).

Hilary of Poitiers: Or, He ascends the mountain, because it is placed in the loftiness of His Father's Majesty that He gives the commands of heavenly life.

Augustine: Or, He ascends the mountain to show that the precepts of righteousness given by God through the Prophets to the Jews, who were yet under the bondage of fear, were the lesser commandments; but that by His own Son were given the greater commandments to a people which He had determined to deliver by love.

Jerome: He spoke to them sitting and not standing, for they could not have understood Him had He appeared in His own Majesty.

Augustine: Or, to teach sitting is the prerogative of the Master. His disciples came to him, that they who in spirit approached more nearly to keeping His commandments, should also approach Him nearest with their bodily presence.

Rabanus Maurus: Mystically, this sitting down of Christ is His incarnation; had He not taken flesh on Him, mankind could not have come unto Him.

Augustine: It causes a thought how it is that Matthew relates this sermon to have been delivered by the Lord sitting on the mountain; Luke, as He stood in the plain. This diversity in their accounts would lead us to think that the occasions were different. Why should not Christ repeat once more what He said before, or do once more what He had done before? Although another method of reconciling the two may occur to us; namely, that our Lord was first with His disciples alone on some more lofty peak of the mountain when He chose the twelve; that He then descended with them not from the mountain entirely, but from the top to some expanse of level ground in the side, capable of holding a great number of people; that He stood there while the crowd was gathering around Him, and after when He had sate down, then His disciples came near to Him, and so to them and in the presence of the rest of the multitude He spoke the same sermon which Matthew and Luke give, in a different manner, but with equal truth of facts.

Gregory the Great: When the Lord on the mountain is about to utter His sublime precepts, it is said, Opening his mouth he taught them, He who had before opened the mouth of the Prophets.

Saint Remigius: Wherever it is said that the Lord opened His mouth, we may know how great things are to follow.

Augustine: Or, the phrase is introductory of an address longer than ordinary.

Chrysostom: Or, that we may understand that He sometimes teaches by opening His mouth in speech, sometimes by that voice which resounds from His works.

== Notes ==
Preceded by Matthew 4:25	Gospel of Matthew; Chapter 5	Succeeded by Matthew 5:3
