= Matthew 5:4 =

- ← 5:3 5:5 →
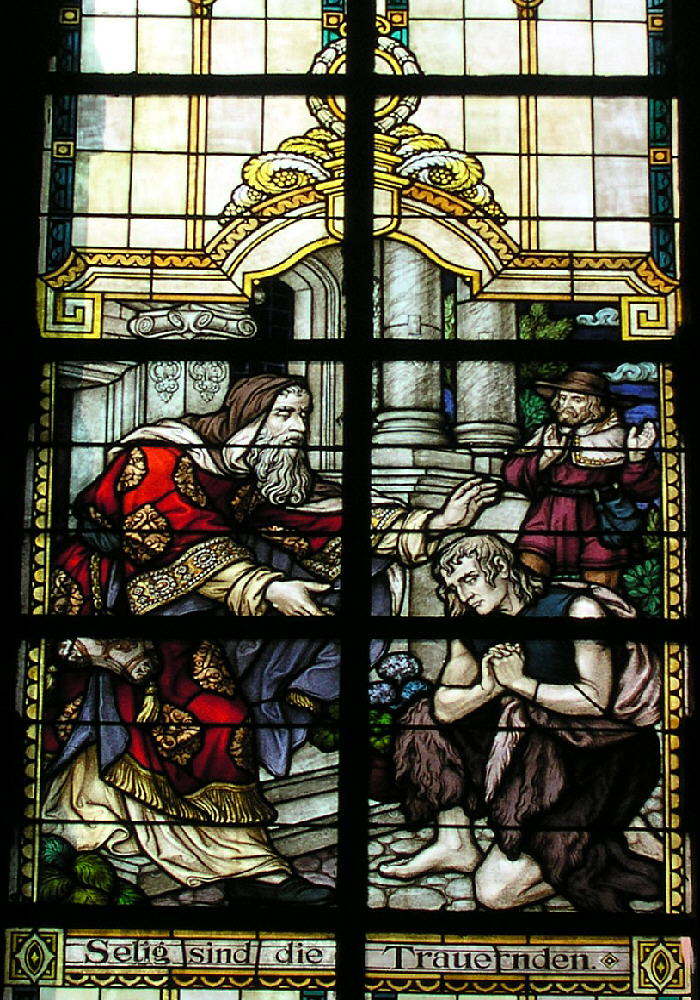
- Matthew 5:4 depicted in the window of a Trittenheim church
- Book: Gospel of Matthew
- Christian Bible part: New Testament

Matthew 5:4 is the fourth verse of the fifth chapter of the Gospel of Matthew in the New Testament. It is the second verse of the Sermon on the Mount, and the second of what are known as the Beatitudes.

== Content ==
In the King James Version of the Bible the text reads:

Blessed are they that mourn:
for they shall be comforted.

The World English Bible translates the passage as:

Blessed are those who mourn,
for they shall be comforted.

The Free Bible translates the passage as:

Blessed are those who grieve, for they shall be consoled.

The Novum Testamentum Graece text is:

μακάριοι οἱ πενθοῦντες, ὅτι αὐτοὶ παρακληθήσονται.

For a collection of other versions see BibleHub Matthew 5:4.

== Analysis ==
This is often considered to be a version of Luke 6:21, part of the Sermon on the Plain, which has weepers being able to laugh. Gundry feels that Matthew modified the verse to better match Isaiah 61:2. Albright and Mann note that in a number of early versions the order of 5:4 and 5:5 are reversed. Schweizer feels the current order was implemented to better reflect Isaiah 61:1-2.

The word mourn does not refer to mourning for the dead, the most common English use of the term. Most scholars feel mourners should be read as "the oppressed." Schweizer notes that the view that it refers to those mourning their sinfulness is wrong. The theology of the period, and in the Gospel of Matthew, is that sins must be hated, not mourned. Schweizer also notes that an early Christian document interprets this verse as referring to the mourning of the unbelievers who will be damned.

== Commentary from the Church Fathers ==
Ambrose: When you have done thus much, attained both poverty and meekness, remember that you are a sinner, mourn your sins, as He proceeds, Blessed are they that mourn. And it is suitable that the third blessing should be of those that mourn for sin, for it is the Trinity that forgives sin.

Hilary of Poitiers: Those that mourn, that is, not loss of kindred, affronts, or losses, but who weep for past sins.

Pseudo-Chrysostom: And they who weep for their own sins are blessed, but much more so who weep for others’ sins; so should all teachers do.

Jerome: For the mourning here meant is not for the dead by common course of nature, but for the dead in sins, and vices. Thus Samuel mourned for Saul, thus the Apostle Paul mourned for those who had not performed penance after uncleanness.

Pseudo-Chrysostom: The comfort of mourners is the ceasing of their mourning; they then who mourn their own sins shall be consoled when they have received remittance thereof.

Chrysostom: And though it were enough for such to receive pardon, yet He rests not His mercy only there, but makes them partakers of many comforts both here and hereafter. God's mercies are always greater than our troubles.

Pseudo-Chrysostom: But they also who mourn for others’ sins shall be comforted, inasmuch as they shall own God's providence in that worldly generation, understanding that they who had perished were not of God, out of whose hand none can snatch. For these leaving to mourn, they shall be comforted in their own blessedness.

Augustine: Otherwise; mourning is sorrow for the loss of what is dear; but those that are turned to God lose the things that they held dear in this world; and as they have now no longer any joy in such things as before they had joy in, their sorrow may not be healed till there is formed within them a love of eternal things. They shall then be comforted by the Holy Spirit, who is therefore chiefly called, The Paraclete, that is, ‘Comforter;’ so that for the loss of their temporal joys, they shall gain eternal joys.

Glossa Ordinaria: Or, by mourning, two kinds of sorrow are intended; one for the miseries of this world, one for lack of heavenly things; so Caleb's daughter asked both the upper and the lower springs. This kind of mourning none have but the poor and the meek, who as not loving the world acknowledge themselves miserable, and therefore desire heaven. Suitably, therefore, consolation is promised to them that mourn, that he who has sorrow at this present may have joy hereafter. But the reward of the mourner is greater than that of the poor or the meek, for to rejoice in the kingdom is more than to have it, or to possess it; for many things we possess in sorrow.

Chrysostom: We may remark that this blessing is given not simply, but with great force and emphasis; it is not simply, ‘who have grief,’ but who mourn. And indeed this command is the sum of all philosophy. For if they who mourn for the death of children or kinsfolk, throughout all that season of their sorrow, are touched with no other desires, as of money, or honour, burn not with envy, feel not wrongs, nor are open to any other vicious passion, but are solely given up to their grief; much more ought they, who mourn their own sins in such manner as they ought to mourn for them, to show this higher philosophy.

Preceded by Matthew 5:3	Gospel of Matthew; Chapter 5	Succeeded by Matthew 5:5
