= Matthew 5:12 =

- ← 5:11 5:13 →
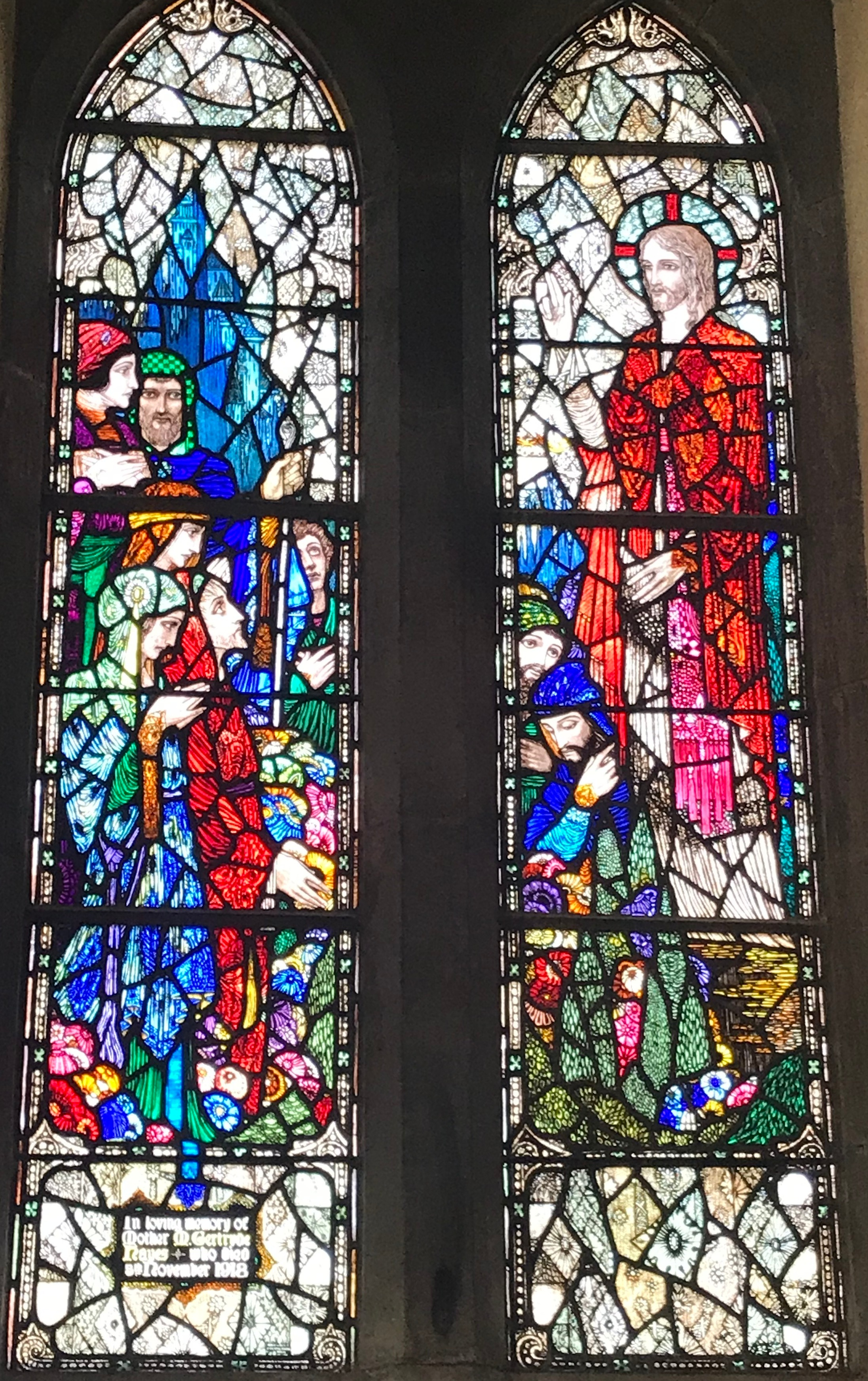
- "The Sermon on the Mount". Stained glass, Chapel of the Sacred Heart, Dingle, County Kerry, Ireland.
- Book: Gospel of Matthew
- Christian Bible part: New Testament

Matthew 5:12 is the twelfth verse of the fifth chapter of the Gospel of Matthew in the New Testament. It is the tenth verse of the Sermon on the Mount. This verse is generally seen as part of an expansion of the eight Beatitude, others see it as the second half of the ninth Beatitude, a small group feel it is the tenth Beatitude and thus brings to a close a second Decalogue.

== Content ==
In the King James Version of the Bible the text reads:

Rejoice, and be exceeding glad: for
great is your reward in heaven: for so persecuted
they the prophets which were before you.

The World English Bible translates the passage as:

Rejoice, and be exceedingly glad, for great is
your reward in heaven. For that is how they
persecuted the prophets who were before you.

The Novum Testamentum Graece text is:

χαίρετε καὶ ἀγαλλιᾶσθε,
ὅτι ὁ μισθὸς ὑμῶν πολὺς ἐν τοῖς οὐρανοῖς
οὕτως γὰρ ἐδίωξαν τοὺς προφήτας τοὺς πρὸ ὑμῶν.

For a collection of other versions see BibleHub Matthew 5:12.

== Analysis ==
R. T. France notes that the word "glad" in the original is actually a more complex term meaning "joy in the face of persecution and martyrdom" that has no easy translation in English.

Some commentators have been concerned about how closely this verse links good behaviour to eternal rewards, and that it implies that concern about these rewards is the main consideration in being moral. Albright and Mann note that the idea of rewards and punishments has "undeniable prominence" in the Gospel of Matthew. Hill feels that reward can be read as simply "good repute", the opposite of the slander in the previous verse. Albright and Mann note that heaven is not here referring to the modern idea of a place that one goes after death which only developed later, rather it refers simply to "being with God."

Schweizer notes that some have read prophets as meaning that this verse, and perhaps that which went before it, was only directed at the elite group of Christ's disciples and not the general population. Schweizer feels that it actually has just the opposite meaning and is instead showing that the promises in Jeremiah 31:34 and Isaiah 54:13 that all would someday be equal to the prophets had come to pass. Hill notes that the Essenes called each other prophets, and that Jesus might have here adopted that usage.

== Commentary from the Church Fathers ==
Glossa Ordinaria: Rejoice, that is, in mind, exult with the body, for your reward is not great only but abundant in heaven.

Augustine: Do not suppose that by heaven here is meant the upper regions of the sky of this visible world, for your reward is not to be placed in things that are seen, but by in heaven understand the spiritual firmament, where everlasting righteousness dwells. Those then whose joy is in things spiritual will even here have some foretaste of that reward; but it will be made perfect in every part when this mortal shall have put on immortality.

Jerome: This it is in the power of any one of us to attain, that when our good character is injured by calumny, we rejoice in the Lord. He only who seeks after empty glory cannot attain this. Let us then rejoice and exult, that our reward may be prepared for us in heaven.

Pseudo-Chrysostom: For by how much any is pleased with the praise of men, by so much is he grieved with their evil speaking. But if you seek your glory in heaven, you will not fear any slanders on earth.

Gregory the Great: Yet ought we sometimes to check our defamers, lest by spreading evil reports of us, they corrupt the innocent hearts of those who might hear good from us.

Glossa Ordinaria: He invites them to patience not only by the prospect of reward, but by example, when He adds, for so persecuted they the Prophets who were before you.

Saint Remigius: For a man in sorrow receives great comfort from the recollection of the sufferings of others, who are set before him as an example of patience; as if He had said, Remember that ye are His Apostles, of whom also they were Prophets.

Chrysostom: At the same time He signifies His equality in honour with His Father, as if He had said, As they suffered for my Father, so shall ye suffer for me. And in saying, The Prophets who were before you, He teaches that they themselves are already become Prophets.

Augustine: Persecuted He says generally, comprehending both reproaches and defamation of character.

Preceded by Matthew 5:11	Gospel of Matthew; Chapter 5	Succeeded by Matthew 5:13
