= Psalm 37 =

37th psalm of the Book of Psalms

- "Fret not thyself because of evildoers"
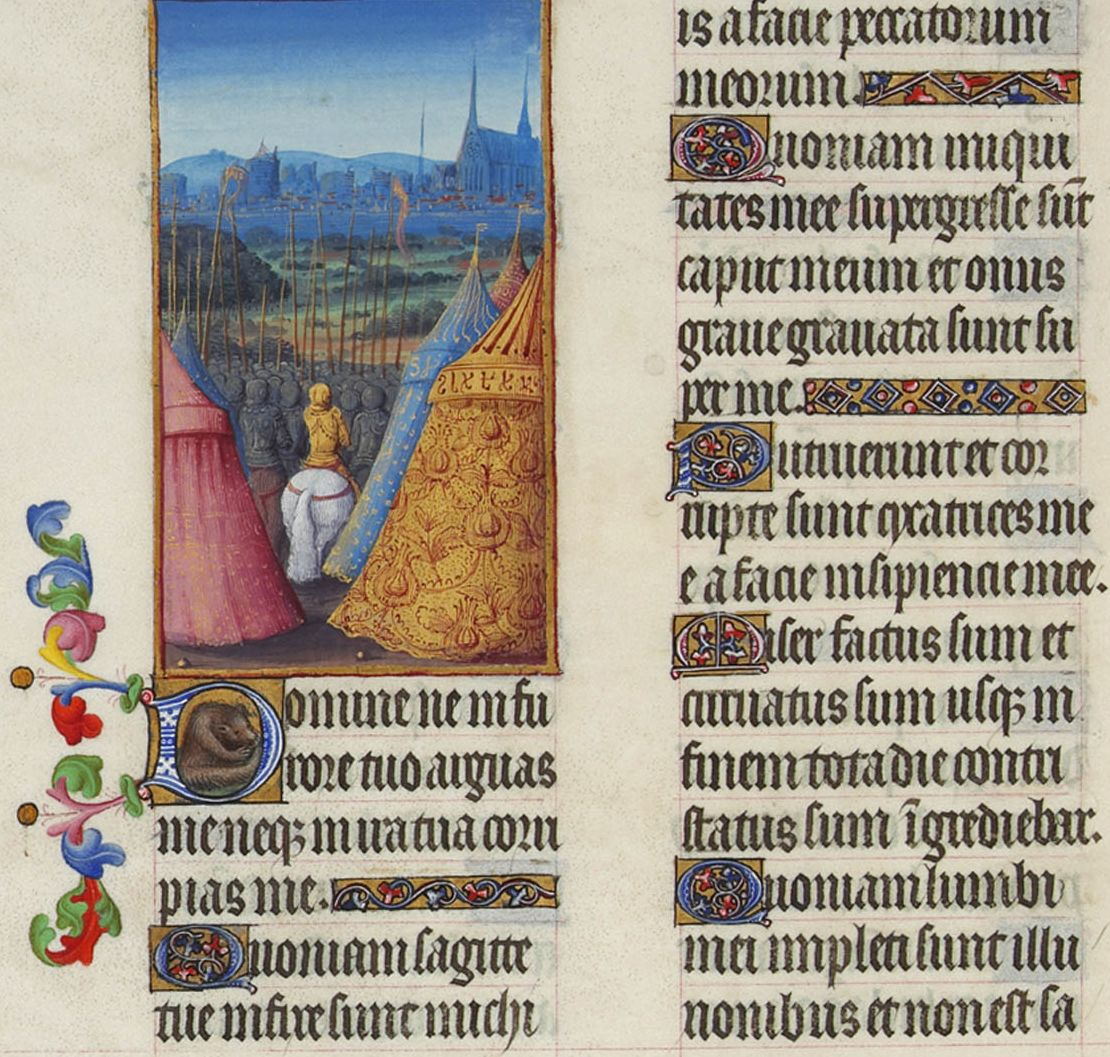
- Manuscript of Psalm 37
- Other name: Psalm 36; Noli aemulari in malignantibus
- Text: by David
- Language: Hebrew (original)

Psalm 37
- ← Psalm 36 Psalm 38 →
- Book: Book of Psalms
- Hebrew Bible part: Ketuvim
- Order in the Hebrew part: 1
- Category: Sifrei Emet
- Christian Bible part: Old Testament
- Order in the Christian part: 19

Psalm 37 is the 37th psalm of the Book of Psalms, In the King James Version, it begins in English: "Fret not thyself because of evildoers, neither be thou envious against the workers of iniquity". The Book of Psalms is part of the third section of the Judaic Tanakh (Hebrew Bible), and is a book of the Old Testament of the Christian Bible. In the slightly different numbering system used in the Greek Septuagint and Latin Vulgate translations of the Bible, this psalm is Psalm 36. In Latin, it is known as Noli aemulari in malignantibus. The psalm has the form of an acrostic Hebrew poem, and is thought to have been written by David in his old age.

The psalm forms a regular part of Jewish, Catholic, Lutheran, Anglican and other Protestant liturgies. It has inspired hymns based on it, and has been set to music, by Baroque composers such as Heinrich Schütz as well as romantic composers such as Anton Bruckner.

== Interpretation ==
Psalm 37 is a response to the problem of evil, which the Old Testament often expresses as a question: why do the wicked prosper and the good suffer? In the New American Bible, Revised Edition, published by the Catholic Church in the USA, the psalm answers that this situation is only temporary: God will reverse things, rewarding the good and punishing the wicked here on earth. This interpretation is shared by Protestants. Matthew Henry calls it David's call to patience and confidence in God by the state of the godly and the wicked. Charles Spurgeon calls it "the great riddle of the prosperity of the wicked and the affliction of the righteous".

It is written as an acrostic and divided into discrete sections. Each section ends with God's resolution of the question.

The psalm has also been understood as a prayer of the persecuted who has taken refuge in the temple or figuratively of refuge in God. The psalm concludes with a plea to God for those who honor him, to bless them with his justice and to protect them from the snares of the wicked.

The theme of inheriting the land reoccurs five times in this Psalm (in verses 9, 11, 22, 29 and 34). Prior to this in Psalm 25:13 the rich as also said to inherit the land as well. Albert Barnes also compares the wicked being cut off in psalm 37:2 and 10 with the wicked being cut off in Psalm 73:27.

The Dead Sea Scrolls contain commentary on the psalm, seeing prophecy of contemporary events to the community in Qumran during the late Second Temple period within it, including references to the Teacher of Righteousness.

== Uses ==
=== New Testament ===
The Beatitudes in the New Testament are influenced by Psalm 37. Psalm 37:11 was cited by Jesus Christ in Matthew 5:5. The English translation of the original reads,

But the meek shall inherit the earth;

and shall delight themselves in the abundance of peace.

=== Judaism ===
- Verse 21 is found in Pirkei Avot Chapter 2, no. 14.
- Verse 25 is part of the final paragraph of Birkat Hamazon.

=== Book of Common Prayer ===
In the Church of England's Book of Common Prayer, Psalm 37 is assigned to be read on the evening of the seventh day of the month.

=== Islam ===
Psalm 37:29 "The righteous shall inherit the land, and dwell therein for ever" is referenced in the Qur'an:

Before this We wrote in the Psalms, after the Message (given to Moses): "My servants the righteous, shall inherit the earth."

— Qur'an, sura 21 (Al-Anbiya), ayah 105.

== Musical settings ==
Heinrich Schütz wrote a setting of a paraphrase of Psalm 37 in German, "Erzürn dich nicht so sehre", SWV 134, for the Becker Psalter, published first in 1628. Verses 30–31 in Latin were set by Anton Bruckner as "Os Justi" in 1879. British composer Clara Ross (1858-1954) used Psalm 37 as the text for her song “Fret Not Thyself.”

== Illuminated manuscripts ==
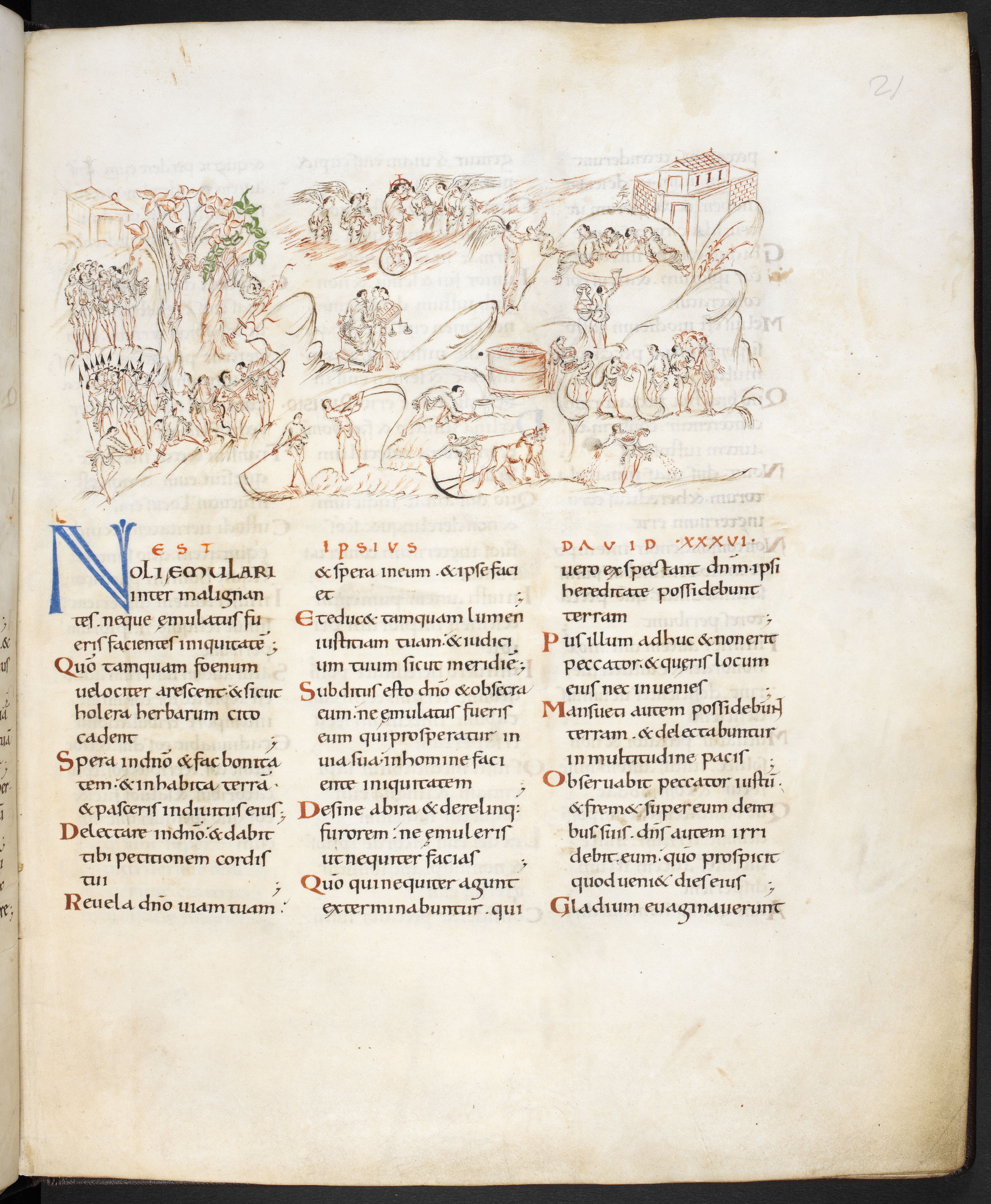
Psalm 37 in the Harley Psalter.

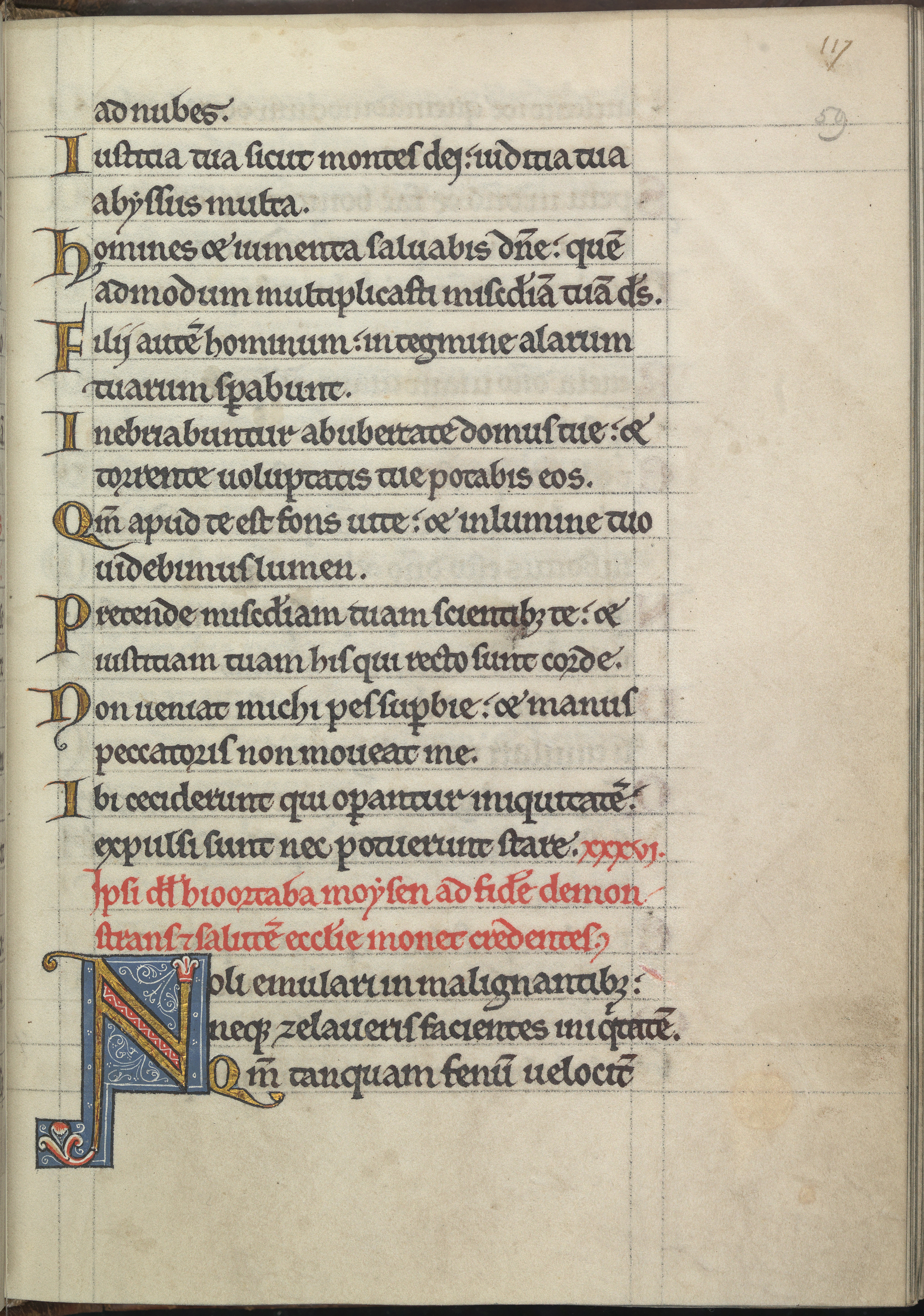
The beginning of Psalm 37, in the Psalter of Eleanor of Aquitaine.

== Text ==
The following table shows the Hebrew text of the Psalm with vowels, alongside the Koine Greek text in the Septuagint and the English translation from the King James Version. Note that the meaning can slightly differ between these versions, as the Septuagint and the Masoretic Text come from different textual traditions. (Note: A 1917 translation directly from Hebrew to English by the Jewish Publication Society can be found here or here, and an 1844 translation directly from the Septuagint by L. C. L. Brenton can be found here. Both translations are in the public domain.) In the Septuagint, this psalm is numbered Psalm 36.

#	Hebrew	English	Greek
1	לְדָוִ֨ד ׀ אַל־תִּתְחַ֥ר בַּמְּרֵעִ֑ים אַל־תְּ֝קַנֵּ֗א בְּעֹשֵׂ֥י עַוְלָֽה׃	(A Psalm of David.) Fret not thyself because of evildoers, neither be thou envious against the workers of iniquity.	Τῷ Δαυΐδ. - ΜΗ ΠΑΡΑΖΗΛΟΥ ἐν πονηρευομένοις μηδὲ ζήλου τοὺς ποιοῦντας τὴν ἀνομίαν·
2	כִּ֣י כֶ֭חָצִיר מְהֵרָ֣ה יִמָּ֑לוּ וּכְיֶ֥רֶק דֶּ֝֗שֶׁא יִבּוֹלֽוּן׃	For they shall soon be cut down like the grass, and wither as the green herb.	ὅτι ὡσεὶ χόρτος ταχὺ ἀποξηρανθήσονται καὶ ὡσεὶ λάχανα χλόης ταχὺ ἀποπεσοῦνται.
3	בְּטַ֣ח בַּ֭יהֹוָה וַעֲשֵׂה־ט֑וֹב שְׁכׇן־אֶ֝֗רֶץ וּרְעֵ֥ה אֱמוּנָֽה׃	Trust in the LORD, and do good; so shalt thou dwell in the land, and verily thou shalt be fed.	ἔλπισον ἐπὶ Κύριον καὶ ποίει χρηστότητα καὶ κατασκήνου τὴν γῆν, καὶ ποιμανθήσῃ ἐπὶ τῷ πλούτῳ αὐτῆς.
4	וְהִתְעַנַּ֥ג עַל־יְהֹוָ֑ה וְיִֽתֶּן־לְ֝ךָ֗ מִשְׁאֲלֹ֥ת לִבֶּֽךָ׃	Delight thyself also in the LORD: and he shall give thee the desires of thine heart.	κατατρύφησον τοῦ Κυρίου, καὶ δώσει σοι τὰ αἰτήματα τῆς καρδίας σου.
5	גּ֣וֹל עַל־יְהֹוָ֣ה דַּרְכֶּ֑ךָ וּבְטַ֥ח עָ֝לָ֗יו וְה֣וּא יַעֲשֶֽׂה׃	Commit thy way unto the LORD; trust also in him; and he shall bring it to pass.	ἀποκάλυψον πρὸς Κύριον τὴν ὁδόν σου καὶ ἔλπισον ἐπ᾿ αὐτόν, καὶ αὐτὸς ποιήσει
6	וְהוֹצִ֣יא כָא֣וֹר צִדְקֶ֑ךָ וּ֝מִשְׁפָּטֶ֗ךָ כַּֽצׇּהֳרָֽיִם׃	And he shall bring forth thy righteousness as the light, and thy judgment as the noonday.	καὶ ἐξοίσει ὡς φῶς τὴν δικαιοσύνην σου καὶ τὸ κρῖμά σου ὡς μεσημβρίαν.
7	דּ֤וֹם ׀ לַיהֹוָה֮ וְהִתְח֢וֹלֵֽ֫ל ל֥וֹ אַל־תִּ֭תְחַר בְּמַצְלִ֣יחַ דַּרְכּ֑וֹ בְּ֝אִ֗ישׁ עֹשֶׂ֥ה מְזִמּֽוֹת׃	Rest in the LORD, and wait patiently for him: fret not thyself because of him who prospereth in his way, because of the man who bringeth wicked devices to pass.	ὑποτάγηθι τῷ Κυρίῳ καὶ ἱκέτευσον αὐτόν· μὴ παραζήλου ἐν τῷ κατευοδουμένῳ ἐν τῇ ὁδῷ αὐτοῦ ἐν ἀνθρώπῳ ποιοῦντι παρανομίαν.
8	הֶ֣רֶף מֵ֭אַף וַעֲזֹ֣ב חֵמָ֑ה אַל־תִּ֝תְחַ֗ר אַךְ־לְהָרֵֽעַ׃	Cease from anger, and forsake wrath: fret not thyself in any wise to do evil.	παῦσαι ἀπὸ ὀργῆς καὶ ἐγκατάλιπε θυμόν, μὴ παραζήλου ὥστε πονηρεύεσθαι·
9	כִּֽי־מְ֭רֵעִים יִכָּרֵת֑וּן וְקֹוֵ֥י יְ֝הֹוָ֗ה הֵ֣מָּה יִֽירְשׁוּ־אָֽרֶץ׃	For evildoers shall be cut off: but those that wait upon the LORD, they shall inherit the earth.	ὅτι οἱ πονηρευόμενοι ἐξολοθρευθήσονται, οἱ δὲ ὑπομένοντες τὸν Κύριον αὐτοὶ κληρονομήσουσι γῆν.
10	וְע֣וֹד מְ֭עַט וְאֵ֣ין רָשָׁ֑ע וְהִתְבּוֹנַ֖נְתָּ עַל־מְקוֹמ֣וֹ וְאֵינֶֽנּוּ׃	For yet a little while, and the wicked shall not be: yea, thou shalt diligently consider his place, and it shall not be.	καὶ ἔτι ὀλίγον καὶ οὐ μὴ ὑπάρξῃ ὁ ἁμαρτωλός, καὶ ζητήσεις τὸν τόπον αὐτοῦ, καὶ οὐ μὴ εὕρῃς·
11	וַעֲנָוִ֥ים יִֽירְשׁוּ־אָ֑רֶץ וְ֝הִֽתְעַנְּג֗וּ עַל־רֹ֥ב שָׁלֽוֹם׃	But the meek shall inherit the earth; and shall delight themselves in the abundance of peace.	οἱ δὲ πραεῖς κληρονομήσουσι γῆν καὶ κατατρυφήσουσιν ἐπὶ πλήθει εἰρήνης.
12	זֹמֵ֣ם רָ֭שָׁע לַצַּדִּ֑יק וְחֹרֵ֖ק עָלָ֣יו שִׁנָּֽיו׃	The wicked plotteth against the just, and gnasheth upon him with his teeth.	παρατηρήσεται ὁ ἁμαρτωλὸς τὸν δίκαιον καὶ βρύξει ἐπ᾿ αὐτὸν τοὺς ὀδόντας αὐτοῦ·
13	אֲדֹנָ֥י יִשְׂחַק־ל֑וֹ כִּי־רָ֝אָ֗ה כִּֽי־יָבֹ֥א יוֹמֽוֹ׃	The LORD shall laugh at him: for he seeth that his day is coming.	ὁ δὲ Κύριος ἐκγελάσεται αὐτόν, ὅτι προβλέπει ὅτι ἥξει ἡ ἡμέρα αὐτοῦ.
14	חֶ֤רֶב ׀ פָּ֥תְח֣וּ רְשָׁעִים֮ וְדָרְכ֢וּ קַ֫שְׁתָּ֥ם לְ֭הַפִּיל עָנִ֣י וְאֶבְי֑וֹן לִ֝טְב֗וֹחַ יִשְׁרֵי־דָֽרֶךְ׃	The wicked have drawn out the sword, and have bent their bow, to cast down the poor and needy, and to slay such as be of upright conversation.	ῥομφαίαν ἐσπάσαντο οἱ ἁμαρτωλοί, ἐνέτειναν τόξον αὐτῶν τοῦ καταβαλεῖν πτωχὸν καὶ πένητα, τοῦ σφάξαι τοὺς εὐθεῖς τῇ καρδίᾳ·
15	חַ֭רְבָּם תָּב֣וֹא בְלִבָּ֑ם וְ֝קַשְּׁתוֹתָ֗ם תִּשָּׁבַֽרְנָה׃	Their sword shall enter into their own heart, and their bows shall be broken.	ἡ ρομφαία αὐτῶν εἰσέλθοι εἰς τὰς καρδίας αὐτῶν καὶ τὰ τόξα αὐτῶν συντριβείη.
16	טוֹב־מְ֭עַט לַצַּדִּ֑יק מֵ֝הֲמ֗וֹן רְשָׁעִ֥ים רַבִּֽים׃	A little that a righteous man hath is better than the riches of many wicked.	κρεῖσσον ὀλίγον τῷ δικαίῳ ὑπὲρ πλοῦτον ἁμαρτωλῶν πολύν·
17	כִּ֤י זְרוֹע֣וֹת רְ֭שָׁעִים תִּשָּׁבַ֑רְנָה וְסוֹמֵ֖ךְ צַדִּיקִ֣ים יְהֹוָֽה׃	For the arms of the wicked shall be broken: but the LORD upholdeth the righteous.	ὅτι βραχίονες ἁμαρτωλῶν συντριβήσονται, ὑποστηρίζει δὲ δικαίους ὁ Κύριος.
18	יוֹדֵ֣עַ יְ֭הֹוָה יְמֵ֣י תְמִימִ֑ם וְ֝נַחֲלָתָ֗ם לְעוֹלָ֥ם תִּהְיֶֽה׃	The LORD knoweth the days of the upright: and their inheritance shall be for ever.	γινώσκει Κύριος τὰς ὁδοὺς τῶν ἀμώμων, καὶ ἡ κληρονομία αὐτῶν εἰς τὸν αἰῶνα ἔσται·
19	לֹֽא־יֵ֭בֹשׁוּ בְּעֵ֣ת רָעָ֑ה וּבִימֵ֖י רְעָב֣וֹן יִשְׂבָּֽעוּ׃	They shall not be ashamed in the evil time: and in the days of famine they shall be satisfied.	οὐ καταισχυνθήσονται ἐν καιρῷ πονηρῷ καὶ ἐν ἡμέραις λιμοῦ χορτασθήσονται.
20	כִּ֤י רְשָׁעִ֨ים ׀ יֹאבֵ֗דוּ וְאֹיְבֵ֣י יְ֭הֹוָה כִּיקַ֣ר כָּרִ֑ים כָּל֖וּ בֶעָשָׁ֣ן כָּֽלוּ׃	But the wicked shall perish, and the enemies of the LORD shall be as the fat of lambs: they shall consume; into smoke shall they consume away.	ὅτι οἱ ἁμαρτωλοὶ ἀπολοῦνται, οἱ δὲ ἐχθροὶ τοῦ Κυρίου ἅμα τῷ δοξασθῆναι αὐτοὺς καὶ ὑψωθῆναι ἐκλείποντες ὡσεὶ καπνὸς ἐξέλιπον.
21	לֹוֶ֣ה רָ֭שָׁע וְלֹ֣א יְשַׁלֵּ֑ם וְ֝צַדִּ֗יק חוֹנֵ֥ן וְנוֹתֵֽן׃	The wicked borroweth, and payeth not again: but the righteous sheweth mercy, and giveth.	δανείζεται ὁ ἁμαρτωλὸς καὶ οὐκ ἀποτίσει, ὁ δὲ δίκαιος οἰκτείρει καὶ δίδωσιν·
22	כִּ֣י מְ֭בֹרָכָיו יִ֣ירְשׁוּ אָ֑רֶץ וּ֝מְקֻלָּלָ֗יו יִכָּרֵֽתוּ׃	For such as be blessed of him shall inherit the earth; and they that be cursed of him shall be cut off.	ὅτι οἱ εὐλογοῦντες αὐτὸν κληρονομήσουσι γῆν, οἱ δὲ καταρώμενοι αὐτὸν ἐξολοθρευθήσονται.
23	מֵ֭יְהֹוָה מִֽצְעֲדֵי־גֶ֥בֶר כּוֹנָ֗נוּ וְדַרְכּ֥וֹ יֶחְפָּֽץ׃	The steps of a good man are ordered by the LORD: and he delighteth in his way.	παρὰ Κυρίου τὰ διαβήματα ἀνθρώπου κατευθύνεται, καὶ τὴν ὁδὸν αὐτοῦ θελήσει σφόδρα·
24	כִּֽי־יִפֹּ֥ל לֹֽא־יוּטָ֑ל כִּֽי־יְ֝הֹוָ֗ה סוֹמֵ֥ךְ יָדֽוֹ׃	Though he fall, he shall not be utterly cast down: for the LORD upholdeth him with his hand.	ὅταν πέσῃ, οὐ καταῤῥαχθήσεται, ὅτι Κύριος ἀντιστηρίζει χεῖρα αὐτοῦ.
25	נַ֤עַר ׀ הָיִ֗יתִי גַּם־זָ֫קַ֥נְתִּי וְֽלֹא־רָ֭אִיתִי צַדִּ֣יק נֶעֱזָ֑ב וְ֝זַרְע֗וֹ מְבַקֶּשׁ־לָֽחֶם׃	I have been young, and now am old; yet have I not seen the righteous forsaken, nor his seed begging bread.	νεώτερος ἐγενόμην καὶ γὰρ ἐγήρασα καὶ οὐκ εἶδον δίκαιον ἐγκαταλελειμμένον, οὐδὲ τὸ σπέρμα αὐτοῦ ζητοῦν ἄρτους·
26	כׇּל־הַ֭יּוֹם חוֹנֵ֣ן וּמַלְוֶ֑ה וְ֝זַרְע֗וֹ לִבְרָכָֽה׃	He is ever merciful, and bendeth; and his seed is blessed.	ὅλην τὴν ἡμέραν ἐλεεῖ καὶ δανείζει ὁ δίκαιος, καὶ τὸ σπέρμα αὐτοῦ εἰς εὐλογίαν ἔσται.
27	ס֣וּר מֵ֭רָע וַעֲשֵׂה־ט֗וֹב וּשְׁכֹ֥ן לְעוֹלָֽם׃	Depart from evil, and do good; and dwell for evermore.	ἔκκλινον ἀπὸ κακοῦ καὶ ποίησον ἀγαθὸν καὶ κατασκήνου εἰς αἰῶνα αἰῶνος·
28	כִּ֤י יְהֹוָ֨ה ׀ אֹ֘הֵ֤ב מִשְׁפָּ֗ט וְלֹא־יַעֲזֹ֣ב אֶת־חֲ֭סִידָיו לְעוֹלָ֣ם נִשְׁמָ֑רוּ וְזֶ֖רַע רְשָׁעִ֣ים נִכְרָֽת׃	For the LORD loveth judgment, and forsaketh not his saints; they are preserved for ever: but the seed of the wicked shall be cut off.	ὅτι Κύριος ἀγαπᾷ κρίσιν καὶ οὐκ ἐγκαταλείψει τοὺς ὁσίους αὐτοῦ, εἰς τὸν αἰῶνα φυλαχθήσονται· ἄνομοι δὲ ἐκδιωχθήσονται, καὶ σπέρμα ἀσεβῶν ἐξολοθρευθήσεται.
29	צַדִּיקִ֥ים יִֽירְשׁוּ־אָ֑רֶץ וְיִשְׁכְּנ֖וּ לָעַ֣ד עָלֶֽיהָ׃	The righteous shall inherit the land, and dwell therein for ever.	δίκαιοι δὲ κληρονομήσουσι γῆν καὶ κατασκηνώσουσιν εἰς αἰῶνα αἰῶνος ἐπ᾿ αὐτῆς.
30	פִּֽי־צַ֭דִּיק יֶהְגֶּ֣ה חׇכְמָ֑ה וּ֝לְשׁוֹנ֗וֹ תְּדַבֵּ֥ר מִשְׁפָּֽט׃	The mouth of the righteous speaketh wisdom, and his tongue talketh of judgment.	στόμα δικαίου μελετήσει σοφίαν, καὶ ἡ γλῶσσα αὐτοῦ λαλήσει κρίσιν.
31	תּוֹרַ֣ת אֱלֹהָ֣יו בְּלִבּ֑וֹ לֹ֖א תִמְעַ֣ד אֲשֻׁרָֽיו׃	The law of his God is in his heart; none of his steps shall slide.	ὁ νόμος τοῦ Θεοῦ αὐτοῦ ἐν καρδίᾳ αὐτοῦ, καὶ οὐχ ὑποσκελισθήσεται τὰ διαβήματα αὐτοῦ.
32	צוֹפֶ֣ה רָ֭שָׁע לַצַּדִּ֑יק וּ֝מְבַקֵּ֗שׁ לַהֲמִיתֽוֹ׃	The wicked watcheth the righteous, and seeketh to slay him.	κατανοεῖ ὁ ἁμαρτωλὸς τὸν δίκαιον καὶ ζητεῖ τοῦ θανατῶσαι αὐτόν,
33	יְ֭הֹוָה לֹא־יַעַזְבֶ֣נּוּ בְיָד֑וֹ וְלֹ֥א יַ֝רְשִׁיעֶ֗נּוּ בְּהִשָּׁפְטֽוֹ׃	The LORD will not leave him in his hand, nor condemn him when he is judged.	ὁ δὲ Κύριος οὐ μὴ ἐγκαταλίπῃ αὐτὸν εἰς τὰς χεῖρας αὐτοῦ, οὐδὲ μὴ καταδικάσηται αὐτόν, ὅταν κρίνηται αὐτῷ.
34	קַוֵּ֤ה אֶל־יְהֹוָ֨ה ׀ וּשְׁמֹ֬ר דַּרְכּ֗וֹ וִֽ֭ירוֹמִמְךָ לָרֶ֣שֶׁת אָ֑רֶץ בְּהִכָּרֵ֖ת רְשָׁעִ֣ים תִּרְאֶֽה׃	Wait on the LORD, and keep his way, and he shall exalt thee to inherit the land: when the wicked are cut off, thou shalt see it.	ὑπόμεινον τὸν Κύριον καὶ φύλαξον τὴν ὁδὸν αὐτοῦ, καὶ ὑψώσει σε τοῦ κατακληρονομῆσαι γῆν· ἐν τῷ ἐξολοθρεύεσθαι ἁμαρτωλοὺς ὄψει.
35	רָ֭אִיתִי רָשָׁ֣ע עָרִ֑יץ וּ֝מִתְעָרֶ֗ה כְּאֶזְרָ֥ח רַעֲנָֽן׃	I have seen the wicked in great power, and spreading himself like a green bay tree.	εἶδον τὸν ἀσεβῆ ὑπερυψούμενον καὶ ἐπαιρόμενον ὡς τὰς κέδρους τοῦ Λιβάνου·
36	וַֽ֭יַּעֲבֹר וְהִנֵּ֣ה אֵינֶ֑נּוּ וָ֝אֲבַקְשֵׁ֗הוּ וְלֹ֣א נִמְצָֽא׃	Yet he passed away, and, lo, he was not: yea, I sought him, but he could not be found.	καὶ παρῆλθον, καὶ ἰδοὺ οὐκ ἦν, καὶ ἐζήτησα αὐτόν, καὶ οὐχ εὑρέθη ὁ τόπος αὐτοῦ.
37	שְׁמׇר־תָּ֭ם וּרְאֵ֣ה יָשָׁ֑ר כִּֽי־אַחֲרִ֖ית לְאִ֣ישׁ שָׁלֽוֹם׃	Mark the perfect man, and behold the upright: for the end of that man is peace.	φύλασσε ἀκακίαν καὶ ἴδε εὐθύτητα, ὅτι ἐστὶν ἐγκατάλειμμα ἀνθρώπῳ εἰρηνικῷ·
38	וּֽ֭פֹשְׁעִים נִשְׁמְד֣וּ יַחְדָּ֑ו אַחֲרִ֖ית רְשָׁעִ֣ים נִכְרָֽתָה׃	But the transgressors shall be destroyed together: the end of the wicked shall be cut off.	οἱ δὲ παράνομοι ἐξολοθρευθήσονται ἐπὶ τὸ αὐτό, τὰ ἐγκαταλείμματα τῶν ἀσεβῶν ἐξολοθρευθήσονται.
39	וּתְשׁוּעַ֣ת צַ֭דִּיקִים מֵיְהֹוָ֑ה מָ֝עוּזָּ֗ם בְּעֵ֣ת צָרָֽה׃	But the salvation of the righteous is of the LORD: he is their strength in the time of trouble.	σωτηρία δὲ τῶν δικαίων παρὰ Κυρίου, καὶ ὑπερασπιστὴς αὐτῶν ἐστιν ἐν καιρῷ θλίψεως,
40	וַ֥יַּעְזְרֵ֥ם יְהֹוָ֗ה וַֽיְפַ֫לְּטֵ֥ם יְפַלְּטֵ֣ם מֵ֭רְשָׁעִים וְיוֹשִׁיעֵ֑ם כִּי־חָ֥סוּ בֽוֹ׃	And the LORD shall help them, and deliver them: he shall deliver them from the wicked, and save them, because they trust in him.	καὶ βοηθήσει αὐτοῖς Κύριος καὶ ῥύσεται αὐτοὺς καὶ ἐξελεῖται αὐτοὺς ἐξ ἁμαρτωλῶν καὶ σώσει αὐτούς, ὅτι ἤλπισαν ἐπ᾿ αὐτόν.

== See also ==
- Beatitudes
- Matthew 5
