= Matthew 5:3 =

- ← 5:2 5:4 →
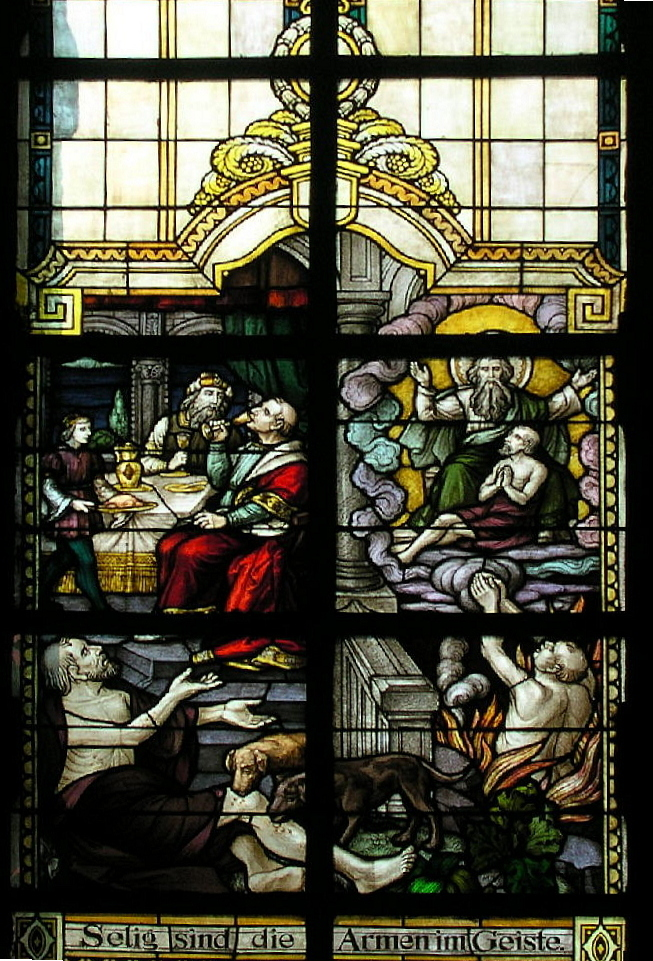
- Matthew 5:3 depicted in the window of a Trittenheim church
- Book: Gospel of Matthew
- Christian Bible part: New Testament

Matthew 5:3 is the third verse of the fifth chapter of the Gospel of Matthew in the New Testament. It is the opening verse of the Sermon on the Mount, and the section of the sermon known as the Beatitudes.

== Content ==
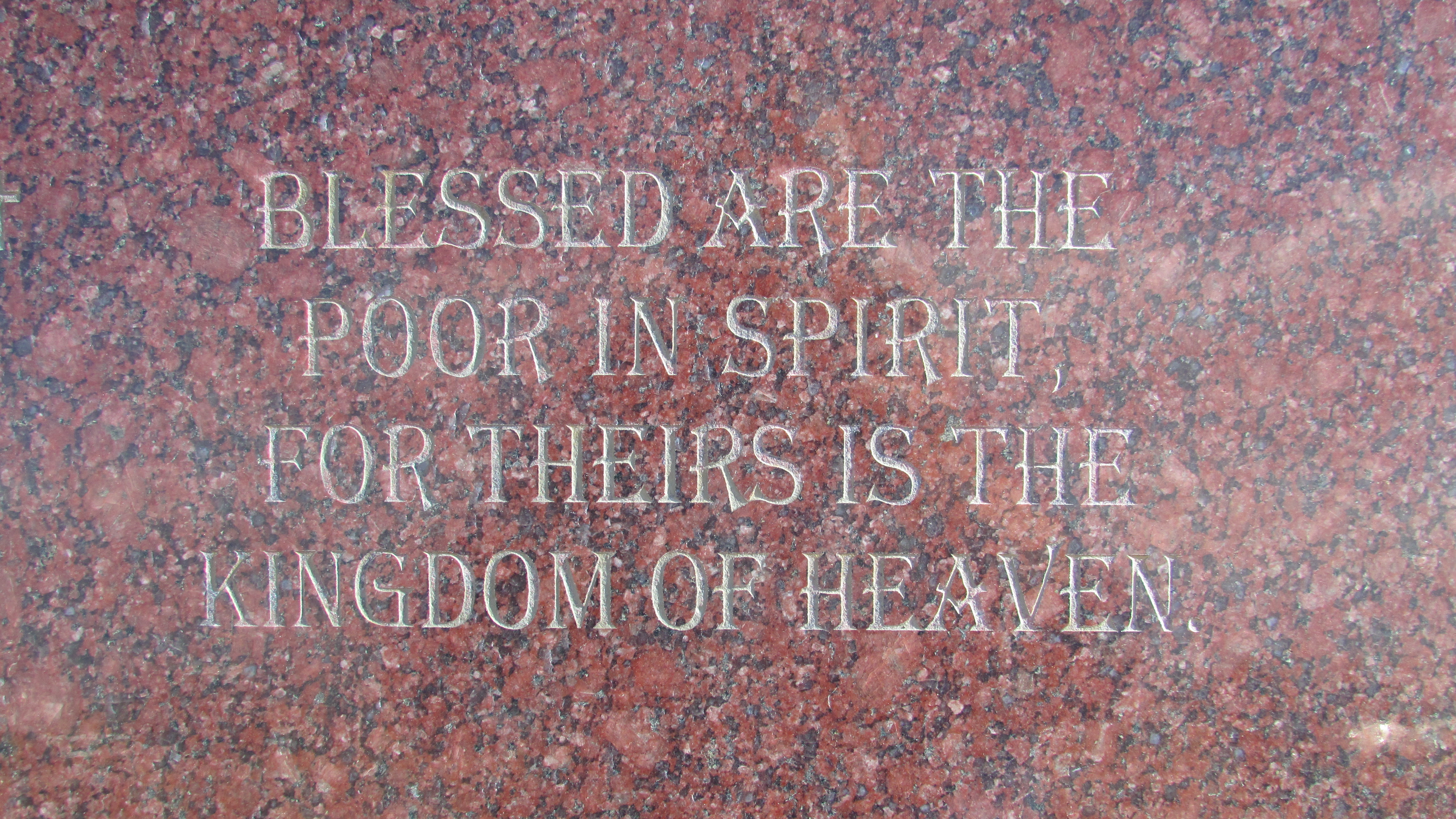
Text of Matthew 5:3 in the Beatitudes at Our Lady of Peace Shrine, along I-80 in Pine Bluffs, Wyoming (2016).

Blessed are the poor in spirit, for theirs is the Kingdom of Heaven. (KJV)

Μακάριοι οἱ πτωχοὶ τῷ πνεύματι, ὅτι αὐτῶν ἐστιν ἡ βασιλεία τῶν οὐρανῶν

beati pauperes spiritu quoniam ipsorum est regnum caelorum (Vulgate)

For a collection of other versions see BibleHub Matthew 5:3.

== Interpretation ==
This verse opens the first of nine statements of who is blessed. Each, except for the last, follows the same pattern of naming a group of people and the reward they will receive.

Hans Dieter Betz notes that in Jesus' time blessed was a common way of describing someone who is wealthy. In his discussion of Croesus in Herodotus, for instance, the link between being blessed and being wealthy is assumed . Similarly, Albright and Mann prefer the word "fortunate" to "blessed" for makarios. They argue that the term has none of the religious implications that the word blessed today has in the English language. Kodjak believes that this opening of the sermon was meant to shock the audience, it was a deliberate inversion of standard values. Today the text is so common that its shock value has been lost. While not a mainstream view, Betz feels this Beatitude has important pre-Christian precedents. He traces it back to Socrates' notion of enkrateia, which explained that the philosopher was one who had no interest in wealth. This idea was adopted by the Cynics, who rejected wealth and saw poverty as the only route to freedom. This group, while small, had a wide influence and some of their ideas were embraced by some Jewish communities at the time of Christ.

Luke 6:20 simply has "blessed are the poor"; that Matthew adds "in spirit" is seen to be of great consequence. The phrase does not appear in the Hebrew Bible, but Psalm 34:18 comes close. The phrase "poor in spirit" occurs in the Dead Sea Scrolls, and seems to have been an important notion to the Qumran community. Scholars generally agree that "poor in spirit" does not mean a deficiency of courage, intellect, or religious awareness. Rather, it denotes a posture of humility and dependence, in which poverty is understood not only as an economic condition but also as a social and moral stance. In this context, “poor in spirit” refers to those who recognize their lack of power, status, and security, and who therefore rely on divine justice rather than wealth or social advantage.

The important expression "Kingdom of Heaven" is generally understood by Christians as referring to the Messianic Age after the Second Coming. For a full discussion of Matthew's use of this phrase see Matthew 3:2.

== Relation to Psalm 37:11 ==
Psalm 37:11 (Hebrew numbering; in the Septuagint often numbered Psalm 36:11) states in Hebrew: > וַעֲנָוִ֥ים יִֽירְשׁוּ־אָ֑רֶץ (*vaʿanavim yirshu aretz*) — “the humble / meek / poor shall inherit the land.”

In the Septuagint this appears as: > οἱ πραεῖς κληρονομήσουσιν γῆν (*hoi praeis klēronomēsousin gēn*) — “the meek shall inherit the earth.”

Many scholars view Matthew 5:3 (“Blessed are the poor in spirit, for theirs is the Kingdom of Heaven”) as a theological and poetic expansion of that psalmic tradition. While Psalm 37:11 speaks of the humble inheriting the *land*, Matthew 5:3 transforms the imagery: *humility in spirit* inherits the *kingdom of heaven*.

In Hebrew, the word עֲנָוִים (*ʿănāwîm*) connotes those who are humble, afflicted, or lowly before God. The Septuagint’s translation by πραεῖς emphasizes “meekness” or gentleness.

Moreover, the Matthean phrase πτωχοὶ τῷ πνεύματι (“poor in spirit”) may represent a redactional development of the *ʿănāwîm* tradition — shifting the focus from external/physical condition to an inner spiritual posture of dependency on God.

Scholars also note that Psalm 37:11 is cited almost verbatim in Matthew 5:5, “Blessed are the meek, for they shall inherit the earth,” making it the clearest direct quotation of the psalm in the Beatitudes. In this light, Matthew 5:3 and 5:5 together can be read as complementary expansions of the same psalmic theme: the *ʿănāwîm* who inherit the land in the Old Testament become the *poor in spirit* who inherit the kingdom of heaven, and the *meek* who inherit the earth, in the New Testament.

== See also ==
- Related Bible parts: Psalm 34, Psalm 37, Matthew 5:5, Matthew 11, Luke 6

Preceded by Matthew 5:2	Gospel of Matthew; Chapter 5	Succeeded by Matthew 5:4
