= Matthew 5:5 =

- ← 5:4 5:6 →
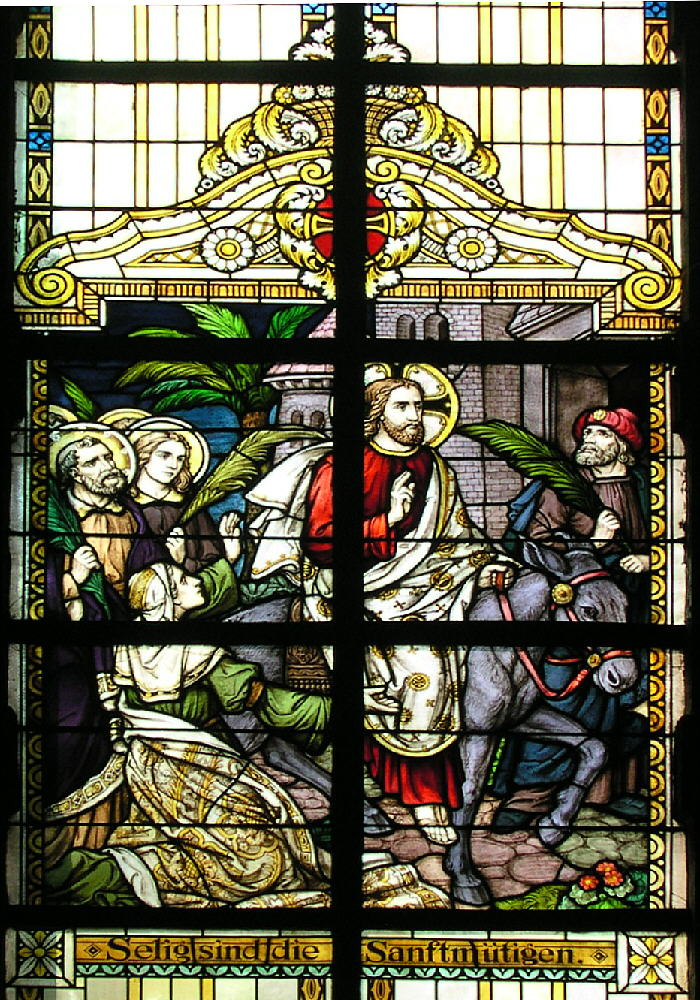
- Matthew 5:5 depicted in the window of a Trittenheim church
- Book: Gospel of Matthew
- Christian Bible part: New Testament

Matthew 5:5 is the fifth verse of the fifth chapter of the Gospel of Matthew in the New Testament. It is the third verse of the Sermon on the Mount, and also the third of what are known as the Beatitudes.

== Content ==
In the King James Version of the Bible the text reads:

Blessed are the meek, for they shall inherit the earth.

The World English Bible translates the passage as:

Blessed are the gentle,
for they shall inherit the earth.

The Novum Testamentum Graece text is:

μακάριοι οἱ πραεῖς,
ὅτι αὐτοὶ κληρονομήσουσιν τὴν γῆν.

== Analysis ==
This well known verse is perhaps the most famous of the Beatitudes. Unlike the previous two, however, this one has no parallel in Luke's Sermon on the Plain. Luke's Sermon contains four Beatitudes and four Woes. There is considerable debate over whether this Beatitude was in Q, and Luke left it out, or if it is an original addition by the author of Matthew. Gundry's theory is that the author of Matthew wanted to remove the woes for later use against the Pharisees in Matthew 23, however he wanted to keep the same eightfold structure and thus needed to create four new sayings. He sees this verse as essentially just a rephrasing of Matthew 5:3; this same wording is also found at Psalm 37:11. Meek and poor, which can also be translated as humble or modest, mean essentially the same thing. Schweizer feels "meek" should be understood as meaning powerless.

== Interpretation ==
The phrase "inherit the earth" is also similar to "theirs is the Kingdom of Heaven" in Matthew 5:3. Schweizer notes that two terms reflect the two different views of the end times current when Matthew was writing. One view was that the end of the world would see all the believers brought up to join the Kingdom of Heaven. The other view was that the end times would have God come down to directly rule Earth, and the chosen people would then be given dominion over the entire world. Hill does not see the two verses referring to different things. He does not feel that the word "earth" means the physical world. Rather he notes that Deuteronomy 4:1 and Deuteronomy 16:20 both use the word "inherit" to refer to the Israelites taking possession of the Holy Land. Hill feels that earth, which can also be translated as land, is an allusion to the new Holy Land, which might not be on Earth. A refined meaning of this phrase has been seen to say that those that are quiet or nullified will one day inherit the world.

Meek in the Greek literature of the period most often meant gentle or soft. Nolland writes that a more accurate interpretation for this verse is powerless. Clarke notes how important and revolutionary this elevation of meekness was in the Mediterranean societies of the time that placed enormous stock in honor and status. Strong's entry for the Greek word praus lists it as "mild, gentle".

This verse has been much praised, even by some non-Christians such as Mahatma Gandhi. Some have seen it less favorably. Baron d'Holbach felt that this verse, and those around it, reflected the interests of Christians when they were a small and powerless sect. He felt that whenever Christians gained power, these views were inevitably abandoned. Friedrich Nietzsche was harshly critical over this verse, which, to him, embodied the "slave morality" of Jesus. It has also been criticized by James Joyce, William Blake, and Theodore Dreiser, who all rejected a life without striving.

== Relation to Psalm 37:11 and Matthew 5:3 ==
Psalm 37:11 (Hebrew numbering: 37:11; Septuagint/Vulgate: 36:11) reads: “וַעֲנָוִ֥ים יִֽירְשׁוּ־אָ֑רֶץ” (*vaʿanavim yirshu aretz*), commonly translated as “the poor / humble / meek shall inherit the land.” In the Septuagint it appears as «οἱ πραεῖς κληρονομήσουσιν γῆν» (*hoi praeis klēronomēsousin gēn*, “the meek shall inherit the earth”).

Most commentators see this verse as the direct Old Testament source for Matthew 5:5 (“Blessed are the meek, for they shall inherit the earth”). The parallelism between Psalm 37:11 and Matthew 5:5 is almost exact, and Matthew appears to deliberately echo the psalmic formula.

In the Masoretic text, the subject is עֲנָוִים (*ʿănāwîm*), a Hebrew word meaning “poor, humble, afflicted,” often with the connotation of piety before God. The Septuagint renders this with πραεῖς (*praeis*, “meek, gentle”).

Scholars also note the connection with Matthew 5:3 (“Blessed are the poor in spirit, for theirs is the kingdom of heaven”) and Luke 6:20 (“Blessed are you who are poor”). The Matthean phrase “poor in spirit” (Greek: πτωχοὶ τῷ πνεύματι) is often explained as a redactional development of the Hebrew concept of *ʿănāwîm* (“the poor/humble of the Lord”), meaning those who are materially poor yet spiritually dependent on God.

Thus, the juxtaposition “the poor/humble shall inherit the land” (Ps. 37:11) and “the poor in spirit… theirs is the kingdom of heaven” (Matt. 5:3), with Matthew 5:5 echoing Psalm 37:11 almost verbatim, is widely interpreted as a poetic extrapolation of Old Testament tradition within the Beatitudes.

== Cultural uses ==
As one of the most famous of Beatitudes, the meek shall inherit the Earth has appeared many times in works of art and popular culture:

- The title of a song ("The Meek Shall Inherit") in the Little Shop of Horrors musical.
- The title of a song on the Frank Zappa album, You Are What You Is ("The Meek Shall Inherit Nothing").
- The songs "Visions of the Night" and "Walking in your Footsteps" by The Police each contain the line, "They say the meek shall inherit the Earth."
- The song "All This Time" by Sting contains the line "Blessed are the poor, for they shall inherit the Earth"
- The theme of the Rush album, 2112, and a line in the song "Overture" of the same album.
- An episode of the War of the Worlds television series.
- J. B. Priestley's Midnight of the Desert contains a discussion of this verse by the characters as does Arnold Bennett's Anna of the Five Towns.
- A rendering of the Beatitudes in Monty Python's 1979 film, Life of Brian includes the verse: "How blest are those of gentle spirit. They shall have the earth for their possession."
- Don Pendleton's Mack Bolan, when reminded that the "meek shall inherit the earth", replied, "Only after the violent have tamed it."
- A line rapped by Jay-Z in the song "Lucifer" from ,The Black Album.
- A line spoken by Rev. David Marshall Lee in the Larry Shue play, The Foreigner.
- A title of a book The Geeks Shall Inherit the Earth and various articles.
- A line in the song, "The Geek" by German band Wir sind Helden.
- The Simon & Garfunkel song, "Blessed", from their album, Sounds of Silence.
- A line by John Mellencamp in the song, "Thank You" from his album, Words & Music: John Mellencamp's Greatest Hits.
- "Try not to forget that the meek inherit earth" is a quote from Staind's song, "How About You".
- A line in the song, "Anything for Jah" by Easy Dub All-Stars.
- In the episode of The Outer Limits titled, "The Vaccine", "The meek shall inherit the Earth" was used as the end quote.
- Welsh Indie Band Gorky's Zygotic Mynci has a song titled: "Blessed are the Meek" on their 1992 album Patio.
- A line in the song, "The Grind Date" by De La Soul from their album, The Grind Date.
- The title of a poem by Charles Bukowski.
- Title of a 1980s album by jazz saxophonist Bobby Watson.
- In the song "1000 More Fools" by Bad Religion in their album, Suffer.
- Comedian Eddie Izzard describes a scenario in her show Circle in which the meek conclude that it's about time they actually did inherit the Earth, and proceed to do so in an organized, armed revolution.
- The poem "Mushrooms" by Sylvia Plath contains the lines "we are meek...we shall by morning, inherit the earth."
- The Firefly episode: "Our Mrs. Reynolds" contains the following line in a deleted scene, spoken by Mal Reynolds encouraging Saffron to act decisively: "More than 70 earths spinnin' about the galaxy, and the meek have inherited not a one."
- In the 1989 film, Dead Poets Society, John Keating (Robin Williams) says to the character Stephen Meeks, "Mr. Meeks, time to inherit the Earth."
- J. Paul Getty once quoted, "The meek shall inherit the Earth, but not the mineral rights."
- Used in the Lost episode "The Moth".
- Was spoken by Priscilla Lapham, portrayed by Luana Patten in the 1957 movie, Johnny Tremain.
- Referenced to in the song, "Ready Or Not" from rapper Meek Mill's Dreamchasers 2 mixtape: "The meek shall inherit the Earth, so I'mma own this bitch till I'm buried in dirt."
- Spoken by the High Lama in the film, Lost Horizon (1937).
- Morley Callaghan's novel, They Shall Inherit the Earth (1935).
- The band Creature Feature used the line, "The Meek Shall Inherit The Earth" as a song title.
- The opening lyrics to the song, "Valley of Death" off of rapper Rick Ross's 2009 album, Deeper Than Rap are "The meek shall inherit the Earth, that's what the Bible says."
- In the Community episode, "Messianic Myths and Ancient Peoples", Donald Glover (as Troy Barnes) raps a rhymed variation of the verse, beginning with "Blessed be the peacemakers, word to the meek: The kingdom of heaven is open all week" as a gesture to his devout Christian friend, Shirley Bennett (Yvette Nicole Brown).
- In the My Morning Jacket song, "Victory Dance" from the album, Circuital (2011), the lyrics state: "Power, hey, do you know how it works/Hey, do you know that the meek, They shall inherit the Earth?"
- In Hearthstone, a daily quest is named "The Meek Shall Inherit."
- The band Silent Planet has a song called "Inherit the Earth" on their 2016 album, Everything Was Sound.
- Spoken by Apocalypse in the film, X-Men: Apocalypse (2016).
- Sung in the song "Shack," in the musical, "Beardo," by composer Dave Malloy.
- Sherlock Holmes as some point tries to explain to Dr. Watson as why horses are the true rulers of the earth.
- “The Night of the Meek.” Episode 47 of The Twilight Zone, aired December 23, 1960 on CBS.
- In the videogame Postal, one of the protagonist diary entries reads "Blessed are the meek, for they make easy targets."

== Commentary from the Church Fathers ==
Ambrose: When I have learned contentment in poverty, the next lesson is to govern my heart and temper. For what good is it to me to be without worldly things, unless I have besides a meek spirit? It suitably follows therefore, Blessed are the meek.

Augustine: The meek are they who resist not wrongs, and give way to evil; but overcome evil of good.

Ambrose: Soften therefore your temper that you be not angry, at least that you be angry, and sin not. It is a noble thing to govern passion by reason; nor is it a less virtue to check anger, than to be entirely without anger, since one is esteemed the sign of a weak, the other of a strong, mind.

Augustine: Let the unyielding then wrangle and quarrel about earthly and temporal things, the meek are blessed, for they shall inherit the earth, and not be rooted out of it; that earth of which it is said in the Psalms, Thy lot is in the land of the living, (Ps. 142:5.) meaning the fixedness of a perpetual inheritance, in which the soul that hath good dispositions rests as in its own place, as the body does in an earthly possession, it is fed by its own food, as the body by the earth; such is the rest and the life of the saints.

Pseudo-Chrysostom: This earth as some interpret, so long as it is in its present condition is the land of the dead, seeing it is subject to vanity; but when it is freed from corruption it becomes the land of the living, that the mortal may inherit an immortal country. I have read another exposition of it, as if the heaven in which the saints are to dwell is meant by the land of the living, because compared with the regions of death it is heaven, compared with the heaven above it is earth. Others again say, that this body as long as it is subject to death is the land of the dead, when it shall be made like unto Christ's glorious body, it will be the land of the living.

Hilary of Poitiers: Or, the Lord promises the inheritance of the earth to the meek, meaning of that Body, which Himself took on Him as His tabernacle; and as by the gentleness of our minds Christ dwells in us, we also shall be clothed with the glory of His renewed body.

Chrysostom: Otherwise; Christ here has mixed things sensible with things spiritual. Because it is commonly supposed that he who is meek loses all that he possesses, Christ here gives a contrary promise, that he who is not forward shall possess his own in security, but that he of a contrary disposition many times loses his soul and his paternal inheritance. But because the Prophet had said, The meek shall inherit the earth, (Ps. 36:11.) He used these well-known words in conveying His meaning.

Glossa Ordinaria: The meek, who have possessed themselves, shall possess hereafter the inheritance of the Father; to possess is more than to have, for we have many things which we lose immediately.

== See also ==
- Matthew 23
- Psalm 37

| Preceded by Matthew 5:4 | Gospel of Matthew; Chapter 5 | Succeeded by Matthew 5:6 |
