= Dhammapada (Easwaran translation) =

1986 English-language book

The Dhammapada Introduced & Translated by Eknath Easwaran
- Author: Eknath Easwaran
- Language: English; also: German, Korean
- Publisher: Nilgiri
- Publication date: 1986; 2007; others
- Pages: 275 (2007)
- ISBN: 978-1-58638-020-5

The Dhammapada / Introduced & Translated by Eknath Easwaran is an English-language book originally published in 1986. It contains Easwaran's translation of the Dhammapada, a Buddhist scripture traditionally ascribed to the Buddha himself. The book also contains a substantial overall introduction of about 70 pages, together with introductory notes to each of the Dhammapada's 26 chapters. English-language editions have also been published in the UK and India, and a re-translation of the full book has been published in German. and Korean.

== Topics covered ==
Both US editions of The Dhammapada contain Easwaran's general introduction, followed by his translations from the original Pali of the Dhammapada's 26 chapters. Selections from Easwaran's chapter titles, which in some cases differ from other translations, are shown in the table at below left.

Chapter Titles,
Selected
(Easwaran translation)
1. Twin Verses
3. Mind
5. The Immature
6. The Wise
7. The Saint
15. Joy
20. The Path
21. Varied Verses
23. The Elephant

Selected Verses from Dhammapada (Easwaran translation):
1.1.	All that we are is the result of what we have thought: we are formed and molded by our thoughts. Those whose minds are shaped by selfish thoughts cause misery when they speak or act. Sorrows roll over them as the wheels of a cart roll over the tracks of the bullock that draws it. [1]
3.1.	As an archer aims an arrow, the wise aim their restless thoughts, hard to aim, hard to restrain. [33]
3.11.	More than your mother, more than your father, more than all your family, a well-disciplined mind does greater good. [43]
20.3.	All the effort must be made by you; Buddhas only show the way. Follow this path and practice meditation; go beyond the power of Mara. [276]
21.1.	If one who enjoys a lesser happiness beholds a greater one, let him leave aside the lesser to gain the greater. [290]

The 2007 edition contains a foreword in which Easwaran states that he translated the Dhammapada for "kindred spirits:" "men and women in every age and culture" who "thrill" to the Dhammapada's message that "the wider field of consciousness is our native land.... The world of the senses is just a base camp: we are meant to be as much at home in consciousness as in the world of physical reality."

Each US edition's Introduction opens with a claim, mentioned by several reviewers, about the value of the Dhammapada within the corpus of Buddhist literature:

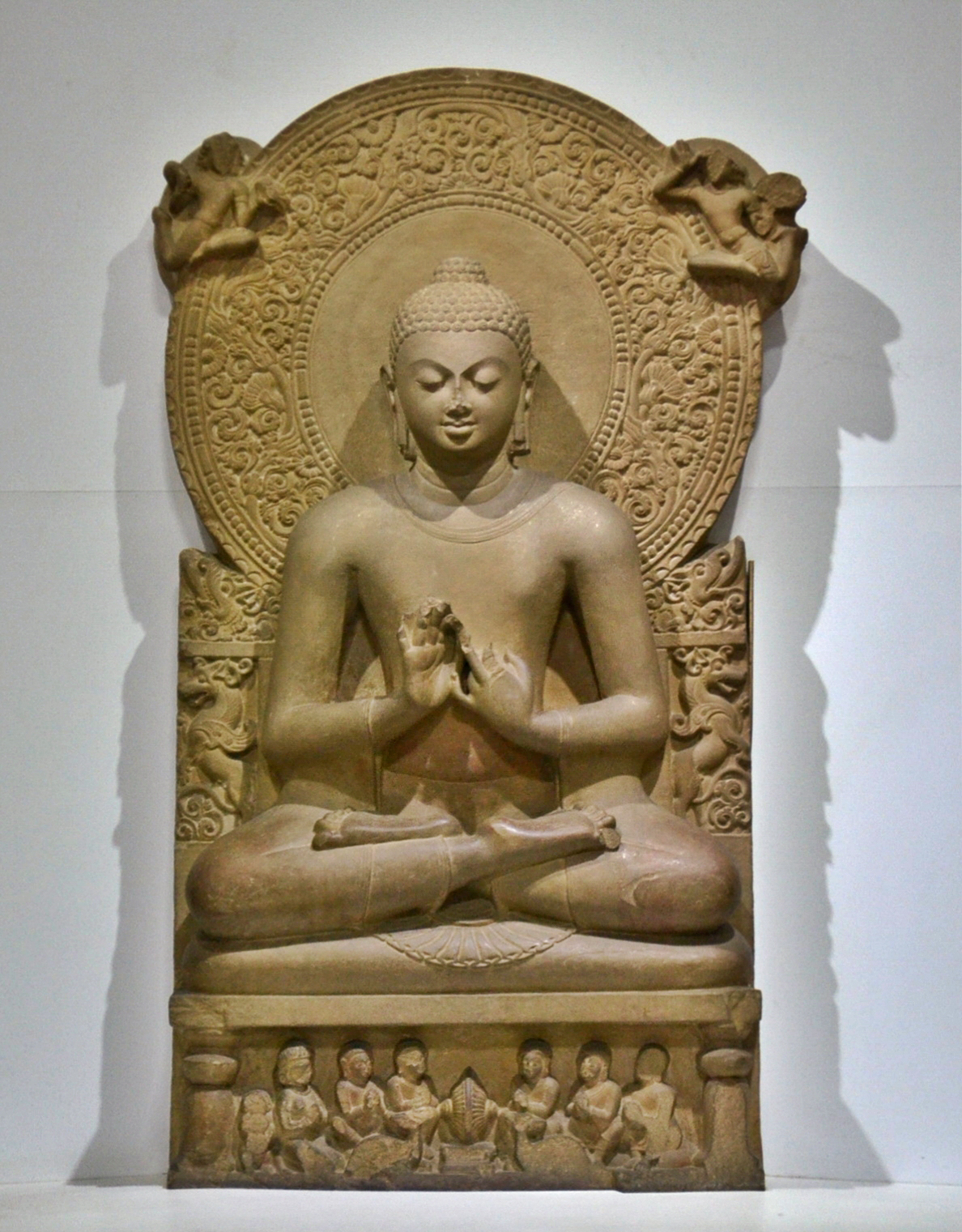
Statue of Buddha, 4th century BCE

If all of the New Testament had been lost, it has been said, and only the Sermon on the Mount had managed to survive these two thousand years of history, we would still have all that is necessary for following the teachings of Jesus the Christ..... Buddhist scripture is much more voluminous than the Bible, but... if everything else were lost, we would need nothing more than the Dhammapada to follow the way of the Buddha.

The introduction states that the Dhammapada has "none of the stories, parables, and extended instruction that characterizes the main Buddhist scriptures, the sutras." Rather, the Dhammapada is:

...a collection of vivid, practical verses, gathered probably from direct disciples who wanted to preserve what they had heard from the Buddha himself..... the equivalent of a handbook: a ready reference of the Buddha's teachings, condensed in haunting poetry and arranged by theme – anger, greed, fear, happiness, thought.

Each US edition's introduction has the same four major sections:

1.	The Buddha's World (pp. 14–27)	A subsection on "The Legacy" describes the cultural context of Vedic religion, already millennia old, in which the Upanishads endorsed the "practice of spiritual disciplines to realize directly the divine ground of life.... as the human being's highest vocation." Describes concepts such as ritam (cosmic order), dharma, karma, rebirth, and moksha that "form the background of the Buddha's life and became the currency of his message." "The Buddha's Times" describes the world's and India's 6th century BCE cultural ferment – "Into this world, poised between the Vedic past and a new high-water mark of Indian culture, the Buddha was born.... squarely in the tradition of the Upanishads.... Yet [bringing] a genius all his own.... the joy in his message is the joy of knowing that he has found a way for everyone, not just great sages, to put an end to sorrow."
2.	Life and Teaching (pp. 28–63)	"The Wheel of Dharma" describes the Buddha's first sermon on the Four Noble Truths; "The Years of Teaching" has parts covering The Homecoming, The Order of Women, The Middle Path, Malunkyaputra (the Parable of the Arrow), Teaching With an Open Hand, The Handful of Mustard Seed, The Clay Lamp, and The Last Entry into Nirvana.
3.	The Stages of Enlightenment (pp. 64–80)	Describes the Four Dhyanas. States that "scholars sometimes treat passage through the four dhyanas as a peculiarly Buddhist experience, but the Buddha's description tallies not only with Hindu authorities like Patanjali but also with Western mystics like John of the Cross, Teresa of Avila, Augustine, and Meister Eckhart."
4.	The Buddha's Universe (pp. 80–98)	States that the Buddha "in his own words, loved the world as a mother loves her only child. But... behind that immense compassion is the penetrating vision of a scientific mind." Subsections present the Buddha's views on "Personality" as a blend of five skandhas; "The World" as "shaped by our mind, for we become what we think" (verse 1.1); "Karma, Death and Birth," arguing that "placing physical phenomena and mind in the same field... leads to a view of the world that is elegant in its simplicity"; and that those who enter Nirvana will "live to give, and their capacity to go on giving is a source of joy so great that it cannot be measured against any sensation the world offers. Without understanding this dimension, the Buddha's universe is an intellectually heady affair."

In each edition, short sections by Stephen Ruppenthal introduce individual chapters by providing background and clarifying Indian philosophical concepts. Many Buddhist philosophical terms are rendered in Sanskrit, and about 30 such terms are defined in a glossary. Endnotes provide more detailed clarification of particular verses, and the second edition contains a 5-page index.

== Reception ==
Reviews have appeared in Smith and Novak's Buddhism: A Concise Introduction (2003), as well as in the Mountain Path, East West, Life Positive (India), the American Theosophist, Parabola, Voice of Youth Advocates, and websites.

In Buddhism: A Concise Introduction, influential scholar of religion Huston Smith and his coauthor Philip Novak wrote that "Our favorite translation is Eknath Easwaran's The Dhammapada. His Indian heritage, literary gifts, and spiritual sensibilities... here produce a sublime rendering of the words of the Buddha. Verse after verse shimmers with quiet, confident authority;" the introduction is described as "sparkling." Elsewhere, the publishers quote Smith as stating that no one else in "modern times" is as qualified as Easwaran to translate the Dhammapada and other Indian spiritual classics.

In the Mountain Path, P. S. Sundaram wrote that Easwaran:

writes of mysticism not from the outside but as one who seems himself to have undergone the experience through profound... meditation. In his introduction he is less a guide post than a guide offering himself as a companion to the reader, and inviting him to take the plunge into the depths of being.

Sundaram also stated that in comparison to the Radhakrishnan translation of the Dhammapada, "The present one... by Mr. Easwaran is superior to it in every way, introduction, translation and get-up, except only that it does not have the original [Pali] verses.... we may set Radhakrishnan's [translation] of the very first verse... beside Easwaran's.... The difference is the difference between a crib and a piece of literature, which is not the less faithful to the original for being a piece of literature."

In Life Positive, Suma Varughese wrote that:

Easwaran's Dhammapada has a tone which is easy and contemporary. It is at once energetic and clear as well as mellifluous.... [and] has a limpid clarity that homes right in. As a vehicle of Buddhist thought, the Dhammapada's haunting poetry adds beauty and emotion to what can often seem a rigorously intellectual discipline.

In Voice of Youth Advocates, Rakow and Capehart wrote that "The Buddha's direct teachings are poetic and arranged by theme... Introductory explanations to each verse will help young adult readers understand the text."

In other reviews, the translation was described as "exceptionally readable" (American Theosophist), or the introduction was described as "clear and lively" (Parabola), or as "inspiring and comprehensive" (East West). The review in East West also quoted the introduction's claim that:

[The Dhammapada's] verses can be read and appreciated simply as wise philosophy; as such, they are part of the great literature of the world. But for those who would follow it to the end, the Dhammapada is a sure guide to nothing less than the highest goal life can offer: self-realization.

In 1989, The Guardian listed the book among the top 5 best-sellers on Buddhism. In 2009, the Journal of Religious History noted that among Dhammapada translations, Easwaran's had been "very popular." It also stated that because Easwaran situated the Dhammapada against the background of the Upanishads, his translation should be seen in the context of Hindu readings.

== Editions ==
The book has been published in English, German, and Korean. English-language editions have been published in the US, the UK, and India. In the US, the book has also been issued by its original publisher as part of a series entitled Classics of Indian Spirituality. The stand-alone US editions are:

- Easwaran, Eknath (2007). The Dhammapada / Introduced & translated by Eknath Easwaran (2nd ed.). Tomales, CA: Nilgiri Press. ISBN 978-1-58638-020-5.; ISBN 1-58638-020-6 (275 pages)
- Easwaran, Eknath (1986). The Dhammapada / translated with a general introduction by Eknath Easwaran; with chapter introductions by Stephen Ruppenthal (1st ed.). Tomales, CA: Nilgiri Press. ISBN 978-0-915132-37-9.; ISBN 978-0-915132-38-6; ISBN 0-915132-38-9; ISBN 0-915132-37-0 (208 pages)

UK edition:

- Easwaran, Eknath (1986). The Dhammapada (1st ed.). London: Arkana. ISBN 978-1-85063-068-5.; ISBN 1-85063-068-2 (208 pages)

Indian editions:

- Easwaran, Eknath (2009). The Dhammapada (With DVD). Mumbai, India: Jaico. ISBN 978-81-8495-073-1.; ISBN 81-8495-073-X (280 pages); Reprinted in 2010: ISBN 81-8495-092-6, ISBN 978-81-8495-092-2 (275 pages).

- Easwaran, Eknath (1996). The Dhammapada. New Delhi, India: Penguin. ISBN 978-0-14-019014-4.; ISBN 0-14-019014-7 (208 pages)

German edition:

- Easwaran, Eknath (2006). Dhammapada: Buddhas zentrale Lehren [Dhammapada: Buddha's central teachings]. Peter Kobbe (trans). Munich, Germany: Random House / Goldmann. ISBN 978-3-442-21764-9. OCLC 162462783.; ISBN 3-442-21764-4 (284 pages)

Korean edition:

- 엑나뜨이스와란 [Easwaran, Eknath] (2018). 담마빠다(경전 6) [Dhammapada]. 김병채[Kim Byung Chae] (trans). Korea: 슈리크리슈나다스아쉬람 [Shree Krishna Das Ashram] / www.krishnadass.com. ISBN 978-89-91596-57-3. (online) ISBN 8991596576 (267 pages)
