= Dhammapada (Radhakrishnan translation) =

1950 book by Dr. Sarvepalli Radhakrishnan

The Dhammapada: With introductory essays, Pali text, English translation and notes
- First edition (1968 imprint)
- Author: Sarvepalli Radhakrishnan
- Language: English
- Subject: Dhammapada
- Genre: Philosophy; Spirituality
- Publisher: Oxford University Press
- Publication date: 1950; 1954; 1958; 1966; 1968; 1980; 1982; 1984; 1988; 1991; 1992; 1997; 2007
- Pages: 194
- ISBN: 0-19-564080-2
- OCLC: 36531930

The Dhammapada: With introductory essays, Pali text, English translation and notes is a 1950 book written by philosopher and (later) President of India, Dr. Sarvepalli Radhakrishnan (1888–1975), about the Dhammapada, an important Buddhist scripture. Originally published in 1950 by Oxford University Press, the book has been republished numerous times by the same publisher, most recently in 1997. A 2007 Indian edition was published by Pilgrims Publishing. The book has been reviewed in several professional journals. All editions have had 194 pages and have used the same title.

== Outline of book ==
Radhakrishnan's Dhammapada contains original Pali text as well as English translations of the Dhammapada's 26 chapters. It begins with a preface composed in 1950 in which Radhakrishnan states that

To-day... We have come to recognize that it is either one world or none. The effort to build one world requires a closer understanding among the peoples of the world and their cultures. This translation of the Dhammapada... is offered as a small contribution to world understanding. The central thesis of the book, that human conduct, righteous behaviour, reflection, and meditation are more important than vain speculations about the transcendent - has an appeal to the modern mind.... Books so rich in significance... require to be understood by each generation in relation to its own problems.

The preface also states that

[The Dhammapada's] teaching - to repress the instincts entirely is to generate neuroses; to give them full rein is also to end up in neuroses - is supported by modern psychology.

Next is a 57-page introduction that is divided into two main sections. The first introductory section, less than 3 pages in length, is entitled simply "The Dhammapada," and briefly summarizes the Dhammapada's historical context, noting that its verses connect with incidents in the Buddha's life "and illustrate the method of teaching adopted by him." The second section, entitled "Gautama the Buddha," has several subsections:

- I. Life (pp. 4-15). Contains a biographical outline of the Buddha's early life, marriage, renunciation, search for and encounter with truth, founding of his order, some major manners and themes of his teaching, and passing away. Notes that "the Buddha was more definitely opposed to Vedic orthodoxy and ceremonialism than was Socrates to the State religion of Athens, or Jesus to Judaism, and yet he lived till eighty.... Perhaps the Indian temper of religion is responsible for the difference in the treatment of unorthodoxies."
- II. The Four Truths (pp. 15-26). Describes the Four Noble Truths taught in Buddhism, that 1) sorrow (duhkha) is pervasive in life as we know it, 2) Sorrow has a cause (samudaya), 3) sorrow can be removed (nirodha), and there is a path (marga) beyond sorrow, the Eightfold Path.
- III. The Buddha and the Upaniṣads (pp. 26-35). "Gautama the Buddha," Radhakrishnan argues, "has suffered as much as anyone from critics without a sense of history. He has been cried up, and cried down, with an equal lack of historical imagination." He explains that "To know what the Buddha actually taught or what his earliest followers thought he did, we must place ourselves in imagination in the India of the sixth century B.C.... Great minds make individual contributions of permanent value to the thought of their age; but they do not, and cannot, altogether transcend the age in which they live.... Even when they are propounding answers which are startlingly new, they use the inadequate ideas and concepts of tradition to express the deeper truths towards which they are feeling their way." He quotes the Buddha as stating that "'there are... four truths of the Brāhmins which have been realized by me... and made known" stating that the Buddha's teaching "is derived" from the Upaniṣads.
- IV. Metaphysical Views (pp. 35-52). Notes that "the Buddha discouraged doctrinal controversies as prejudicial to inward peace and ethical striving." Discusses attempts to view the Buddha as adhering to various metaphysical positions, especially 1) agnosticism, 2) atheism, or 3) belief in a "transempirical reality in the universe" and a "time-transcending element in the self." Argues that the third interpretation (belief in a transempirical reality) is most consistent with what is known of the Buddha.
- V. Spiritual Absolutism (pp. 52-57). Here, Radhakrishnan states that "The tradition of teaching by silence has been an ancient one in India," and argues that "If the Buddha declined to define the nature of this absolute or if he contented himself with negative definitions, it is only to indicate that absolute being is above all determinations. It is difficult to differentiate this supreme being from the Absolute Brahman of Advaita Vedanta or the super-God of Christian mysticism as formulated in the writings of the pseudo-Dionysius." "The Buddha's reasons for his silence are quite intelligible," states Radhakrishnan, and he enumerates five motives for the Buddha's silence.

Selected Verses, with Translation:
Chapter I: Yamakavaggo (Twin Verses)
Chapter XXI: Pakiņņakavaggo (Miscellaneous Verses)

Pali (transliterated)

I.1.
manopubbaṅgamā dhammā manoseṭṭhā manomayā manasā ce paduṭṭhena bhāsati vā karoti vā tato naṁ dukkham anveti cakkaṁ va vahato padam [1]
XXI.1.
mattā-sukhapariccāgā passe ce vipula sukham caje mattā-sukhaṁ dhīro sampassaṁ vipulaṁ sukham [290]

English translation (by Radhakrishnan)

I.1.
(The mental) natures are the result of what we have thought, are chieftained by our thoughts, are made up of our thoughts. If a man speaks or acts with an evil thought, sorrow follows him (as a consequence) even as the wheel follows the foot of the drawer (i.e. the ox which draws the cart). [1]
XXI.1.
If, by surrendering a pleasure of little worth one sees a larger pleasure, the wise man will give up the pleasure of little worth, and look to the larger pleasure. [290]

Also in the fifth section, Radhakrishnan offers his interpretation of three "inadequacies" or "exaggerations" in the Buddha's thought, which "revealed themselves in [Buddhism's] later history and relation to Hinduism." These are that i) "Philosophy is a natural necessity of the human mind," and the Buddha's hearers were unable to adopt suspended judgement on the ultimate questions; ii) "The Buddha's conception of dharma as the absolute reality was not sufficiently concrete for practical purposes"; and iii) The Buddha taught that one could renounce householder duties at any age. Radhakrishnan states that these "exaggerations" are understandable if we realize that in the Buddha's time, attempts to lead the spiritual life had to contend with "three great enemies... the theologians, the ritualists, and the worldlings."

The largest part of the book (pp. 58–187) consists of a romanized transliteration of the original Pali text, plus a verse-by-verse English translation. Two examples are shown in the table at right. Many verses are augmented with footnotes or are followed by commentary, presented in a smaller font size than the verses themselves. The book concludes with a short selected bibliography, a 4-page Pali index (indicating which verses contain a specified word), and a 2-page general index.

== Reception ==
The book has been reviewed in professional journals that include The Journal of Religion, Philosophy, Bulletin of the School of Oriental and African Studies, and Journal of the Royal Asiatic Society of Great Britain and Ireland.

Ashby stated that "the distinct contribution of this volume is the Introduction," where "Radhakrishnan sets out in clear and penetrating fashion to give the reader a basic understanding of the thought-world in which Buddhist ethical teaching moves. His discussion of the relation of the teachings of the Buddha to the Upanishads and his examination of the metaphysical views of Sakyamuni will prove valuable ... [and his] insistence upon the positive nature of the Buddhist conception of Nirvana is recommended reading for... victims of the 'annihilation-extinction' theory of Nirvana."

Horner noted that the same Pali word is translated differently by Radhakrishnan in different places. "Pali technical terms are, of course, recognized to contain a subtle variety of meanings. Some of these will be appreciated by anyone making... the reasonably intensive study of this volume which it deserves as well as makes possible." For example, "Professor Radhakrishnan translates dhamma in the text by 'virtue' and by 'law.... Thus, asava is rendered by 'passions', 'taints', 'impurities', and... Samadhi is usually 'tranquillity', once (ver. 271) 'meditative calm'."

Brough described the book as "a convenient presentation of the Pali text, and... a useful introduction to the work for beginners in Pali," although "a comprehensive textual study in the light of the Tibetan and Central Asian parallel verses is still awaited."

In the journal Philosophy, Stede stated that "On the whole, the translation is clear and accurate." She added that the translated verses are "frequently... supplemented by explanations taken from the early commentator Buddhaghosa and by comparative passages selected from philosophical and theological texts of East and West. Although perhaps too numerous, these extraneous references give evidence of the translator's wide learning."

== Editions ==
Editions have been published in 1950, 1954, 1958, 1966, 1968, 1980, 1982, 1984, 1988, 1991, 1992, 1996, 1997, and 2007, and include:

- Varanasi, India: Pilgrims Publishing. (2007). ISBN 978-81-7769-545-8, ISBN 81-7769-545-2, OCLC 644644182.
- London: Oxford University Press (1997), The Dhammapada: With introductory essays, Pali text, English translation and notes, ISBN 978-0-19-564080-9, ISBN 0-19-564080-2, OCLC 36531930.
- London: Oxford University Press (1950), The Dhammapada: With introductory essays, Pali text, English translation and notes

== See also ==
- Radhakrishnan's The Principal Upanishads (book)
- Dhammapada (Easwaran translation)
