= Asava =

Mental defilements in Buddhism

Āsava is a Pali term (Sanskrit: Āsrava) that is used in Buddhist scripture, philosophy, and psychology, meaning "influx, canker." It refers to the mental defilements of sensual pleasures, craving for existence, and ignorance, which perpetuate samsara, the beginningless cycle of rebirth, dukkha, and dying again.

Asavas are also translated as "karmic predilections" and "karmic propensities" in Buddhism. The term is also common in Jainist literature, and sometimes appears equivalently as Asrava or Anhaya. However, Buddhism rejects the karma and asava theories of Jainism, and presents a different version instead.

== Etymology ==
According to Bhikkhu Bodhi,

The commentaries derive the word from a root su meaning "to flow." Scholars differ as to whether the flow implied by the prefix ā is inward or outward; hence some have rendered it as "influxes" or "influences," others as "outflows" or "effluents."

Ajahn Sucitto in his book Kamma and the end of Kamma describes āsavas as "underlying biases" (that fabricate things, emotions, sensations, and responses), which condition grasping through which samsara operates.

== Meaning ==
=== Samsara ===
The āsavas are mental defilements that perpetuate samsara, the beginningless cycle of rebirth, dukkha, and dying again. Carr and Mahalingam:

inflow, influx, influence; mental bias or canker, cankers that keep one bound to the world of samsāra; used particularly in Jainism and Buddhism.

Bhikkhu Bodhi:

A stock passage in the suttas indicates the term's real significance independently of etymology when it describes the āsavas as states "that defile, bring renewal of existence, give trouble, ripen in suffering, and lead to future birth, aging and death" (MN 36.47; I 250). Thus other translators, bypassing the literal meaning, have rendered it "cankers," "corruptions," or "taints."

De Silva further explains: The word canker suggests something that corrodes or corrupts slowly. These figurative meanings perhaps describe facets of the concept of āsava: kept long in storage, oozing out, taint, corroding, etc.

=== Number of āsavas ===
Some Pali canons mention three āsava that sustain karmic flow. These three mentioned in the Nikāyas are "karmic propensities for sensual pleasures (kāmāsava), karmic propensities for existence (bhavāsava), and karmic propensities for ignorance (avijjāsava)".

Other Pali texts mention four āsava, adding diṭṭhāsava or "karmic propensities for a viewpoint or perspective".

In either case, these texts assert that the complete destruction of all these asavas is synonymous with complete Awakening.

=== Liberation ===
According to Rhys Davids & Stede (1921–25), "Freedom from the 'Āsavas' constitutes Arahantship." According to Bhikkhu Bodhi,

When the disciple's mind is liberated from the taints by the completion of the path of arhantship, he reviews his newly won freedom and roars his lion's roar: "Birth is destroyed, the spiritual life has been lived, what had to be done has been done; there is no more coming back to any state of being."

== Textual appearance ==
Sarvepalli Radhakrishnan, in his translation of the Dhammapada, notes that the word "asava" appears in the Dhammapada in verses 93, 226, 253, 272, 292, and 293. Verse 226 (chapter 17, verse 6) has been translated by Acharya Buddharakkhita as follows:

Those who are ever vigilant, who discipline themselves day and night,
and are ever intent upon Nibbana – their defilements fade away. (Note: Radhakrishnan: "6. sadā jāgaramānānam, ahorattānusikkhinam nibbāṇam adhimuttānam, atthaṁ gacchanti āsavā 226.")

== Sources ==
- Bhikkhu Bodhi, ed. (2005), In the Buddha's Words: An Anthology of Discourses from the Pāli Canon, Boston: Wisdom Publications
- Buddharakkhita (1985), The Dhammapada: The Buddha's Path of Wisdom, Kandy, Sri Lanka: Buddhist Publication Society
- De Silva, Padmasiri (2000), An introduction to Buddhist psychology, Rowman & Littefield, ISBN 978-0-7425-0857-6
- Carr, Brian; Mahalingam, Indira (1997), Companion Encyclopedia of Asian Philosophy, London; New York: Routledge, ISBN 0-415-03535-X
- Radhakrishnan, Sarvepalli (1950), The Dhammapada
- Rhys Davids; Stede (1921–25). "Āsavas". Archived from the original on 3 April 2008.
