= Chakragil =

Mountain in Xinjiang, China

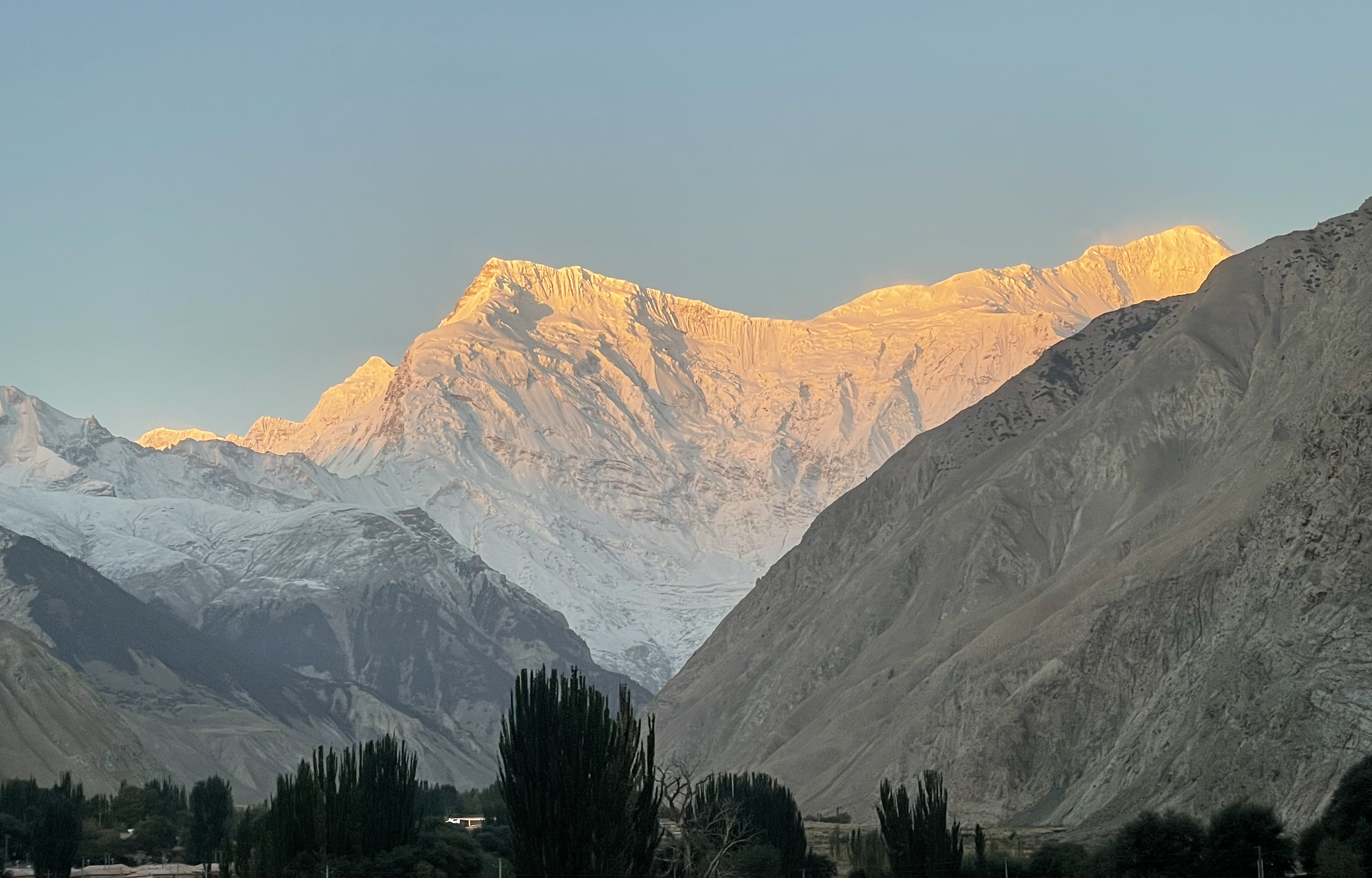
- Sunrise on Chakragil, from Kizilsu, about 17km to the NE

Highest point
- Elevation: 6,760 m (22,180 ft) (Note: Other sources give the height as 6,725 m (22,064 ft); see the AAJ 1989 reference and the Tilman reference. Also see the discussion about Kingata Tagh.)
- Prominence: 2,934 m (9,626 ft); Ranked 103rd
- Listing: Ultra
- Coordinates: 38°51′57″N 75°06′30″E (Note: Note that the Himalayan Index has a seriously incorrect latitude for this peak.)

Geography
- Location within China
- Location: Xinjiang, China
- Parent range: Kunlun Mountains

Climbing
- First ascent: September 1, 1988 by Misao Hirano, Minoru Hachisu, Kenji Nakayama
- Easiest route: glacier/snow climb

The Chakragil, also known as the Kingata Tagh in Turkic languages, is a major mountain in Xinjiang, China, at 6,760 metres. It is located about 100 kilometres (60 mi) southwest of Kashgar, about 60 kilometres (40 mi) due north of Muztagh Ata, and 37 kilometres (23 mi) northwest of Kongur Tagh. It is in the subrange known as the Kingata Shan, generally included in the eastern Pamirs, as it (and the neighboring Kongur Shan range) are separated by the major Yarkand River valley from the extreme northwest end of the Kunlun Mountains, near the Pamir Mountains. The Gez River flows just south of the mountain.

Due to its remote location, Chakragil is a little-visited peak. It was attempted by the noted mountaineering pair Eric Shipton and Bill Tilman in September 1948. However they only reached a height of about 5,200 m (17,000 ft). On September 1, 1988, Japanese leader Misao Hirano, together with Minoru Hachisu and Kenji Nakayama, made the first ascent of the mountain. The peak was climbed again in 2000 by Mark Newcomb, alone, via the west ridge. The Himalayan Index lists no other ascents or attempts.

Names of peaks and ranges in this area are often uncertain. Chakragil is one of the peaks in the Kingata Shan, but it is unclear which of these peaks it should be identified with. For the purposes of this article (in particular the topographic prominence value), it is treated as identical with Kingata Tagh, the highest peak of the Kingata Shan. If this identification is incorrect (in particular, Chakragil may actually be Kingata Tagh II), it is unclear what peak(s) were climbed in 1988 and 2001, and it further uncertain as to whether Kingata Tagh has been climbed. A map of Central Asia published by Map Link shows a 6,760 metres (22,180 ft) mountain north of the Gez river which it calls 'Karabekter Tagh'. It shows Chakragil as a small lake to the southwest. The mountain is just north of the Karakorum Highway.

In November 2024, Chinese state media released a surveillance video of a massive snow avalanche from the summit of Chakragil in Oytagh Glacier Park.
