= Viggo Fausböll =

Danish educator, translator, orientalist and linguist (1821–1908)

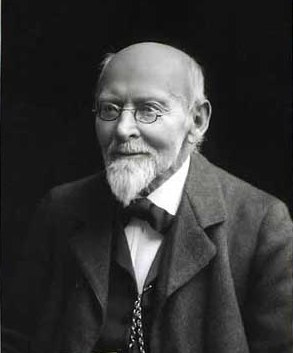
- Fausböll, c. 1900
- Born: 22 September 1821; Høve, Denmark
- Died: 3 June 1908 (aged 86)
- Occupation: Orientalist

Michael Viggo Fausböll (22 September 1821 – 3 June 1908) was a Danish educator, translator, orientalist and linguist. He was a pioneer of Pāli scholarship.

== Biography ==
Fausbøll was born at Hove near Lemvig, Denmark. He became a student at the University of Copenhagen in 1838 and received his Cand.theol. in 1847. From 1878 to 1902 Fausbøll was professor at the University of Copenhagen where he taught Sanskrit and East Indian philology.

His Latin translation of the Dhammapada was published in 1855 with a new edition in 1900. It formed the basis for the first complete translation of this text into English, by philologist Max Müller in the Sacred Books of the East, a 50-volume set published by Oxford University Press between 1879 and 1910. Beginning in 1849, he had started publishing extracts from the Jatakas, and eventually undertook editing the entire canon of Jataka tales along with all the available commentaries. It was published in six volumes, with an additional seventh volume containing the various kinds of indexes to the volumes compiled by Dines Andersen. The first volume of these editions were published in 1877 by and the sixth volume in 1896.

He became a Knight of the Order of the Dannebrog in 1888, Dannebrogsmand in 1891 and Commander 2nd degree in 1898. He died at Gentofte in 1908 and was buried at Gentofte Cemetery.

== Publications ==
Fausböll's translations include:

- The Dhammapada: Being a collection of moral verses in Pali (trans. into Latin) (Copenhagen, 1855).
- The Dasaratha Jataka: Being the Buddhist Story of King Rama (Copenhagen, London, 1870).
- Sutta-Nipata (Sacred Books of the East) (Oxford: Clarendon Press, 1881; and, London: PTS, 1885).
- The Jataka Together with Its Commentary (London: PTS, 1877-1896).

Fausböll also wrote:

- Indian mythology according to the Mahabharata. (London: Luzac, 1903; reprinted as Indian mythology according to the Indian epics, New Delhi: Cosmo, 1981)
