= Jorge Quinteros (mountaineer) =

Chilean mountaineer

Jorge Quinteros is a Chilean mountaineer who has an extensive career as an explorer, guide and teacher. Together with Harold William Tilman, they were the first to traverse the Southern Patagonian Ice Field in the summer of 1955-1956. Currently he works in Dirección General de Aguas and teaches at the University of Chile.

== Sources ==
- Jorge Quinteros: Leyenda de la Montaña, Revista Viaje, El Mercurio.
