= Bill Tilman =

British explorer (1898–1977)

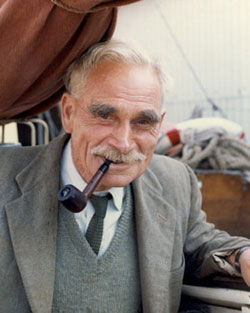
- Bill Tilman by Sandy Lee
- Born: 14 February 1898; Wallasey, Cheshire, England
- Died: 1977 (aged 79); South Atlantic Ocean
- Occupations: Mountaineer, Explorer

Major Harold William Tilman, CBE, DSO, MC and Bar, (14 February 1898 – November 1977) was an English soldier, mountaineer and explorer, renowned for his Himalayan climbs and sailing voyages.

== Early years and Africa ==
Bill Tilman was born on 14 February 1898 in Wallasey, Cheshire, the son of a wealthy sugar merchant John Hinkes Tilman and his wife Adeline Schwabe (née Rees). He was educated at Berkhamsted Boys school. During the First World War he entered the Royal Military Academy, Woolwich and, on 28 July 1915, he graduated from Woolwich where he was commissioned as a second lieutenant into the Royal Field Artillery of the British Army. Tilman fought at the Battle of the Somme, and was twice awarded the Military Cross for bravery.

His climbing career, however, began with his acquaintance with Eric Shipton in Kenya, East Africa, where they were both coffee growers. Beginning with their joint traverse of Mount Kenya in 1929 and their ascents of Kilimanjaro and the fabled "Mountains of the Moon" Ruwenzori, Shipton and Tilman formed one of the most famed partnerships in mountaineering history. When it came time to leave Africa, Tilman was not content with merely flying home but rode a bicycle across the continent to the west coast where he embarked for England.

== Mount Everest and Nanda Devi ==
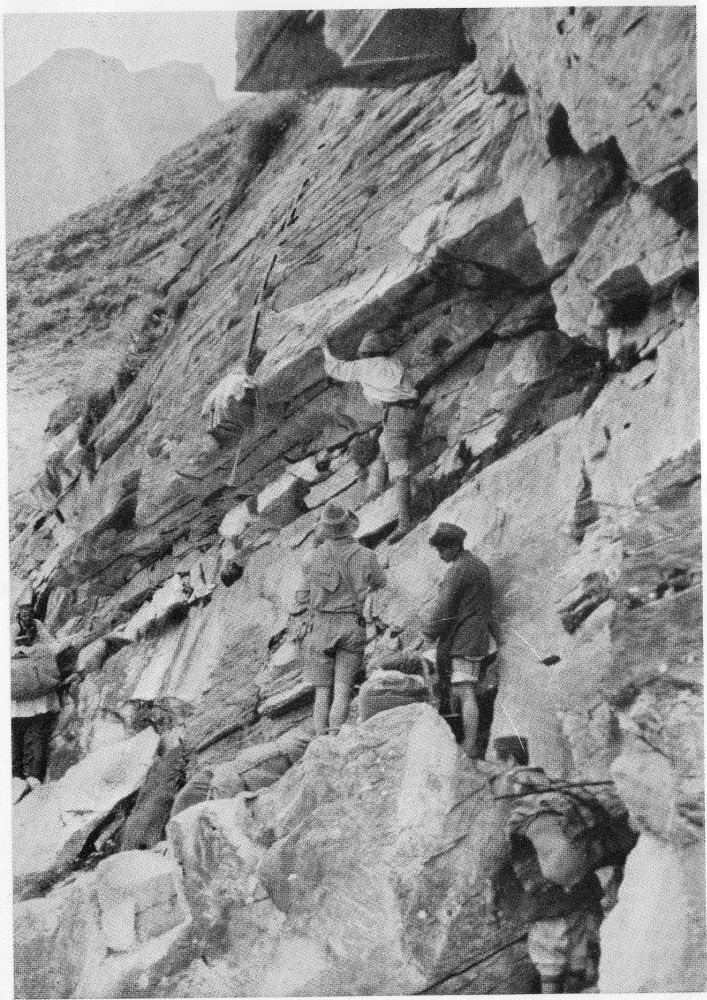
Shipton-Tilman 1934 Nanda Devi Sanctuary expedition. "Hauling loads below 'Pisgah'" buttress in the Rishi Ganga gorge

Tilman was involved in two of the 1930s Mount Everest expeditions - participating in the 1935 Reconnaissance Expedition, and reaching 27,200 feet without oxygen as the expedition leader in 1938. He entered the Nanda Devi sanctuary with Eric Shipton in 1934, and in 1936 he went on to lead an Anglo-American expedition to Nanda Devi. With the support of a team which included Peter Lloyd and H. Adams Carter, Tilman and Noel Odell succeeded in making the first ascent of the 7,816 metres (25,643 ft) mountain, which remained the highest summit climbed by man until 1950. Tilman later described their arrival on the summit:

Odell had brought a thermometer, and no doubt sighed for the hypsometer. From it we found that the air temperature was 20 °F (−7 °C) but in the absence of the wind we could bask gratefully in the friendly rays of our late enemy the sun. It was difficult to realise that we were actually standing on top of the same peak which we had viewed two months ago from Ranikhet, and which had then appeared incredibly remote and inaccessible, and it gave us a curious feeling of exaltation to know that we were above every peak within a hundred miles on either hand. Dhaulagiri, 1,000ft higher, and 200 miles away in Nepal, was our nearest rival. I believe we so far forgot ourselves as to shake hands on it.

In 1939, Tilman was the first man to attempt climbing in the remote and unexplored Assam Himalaya, exploring the Southern approaches of Gori Chen, 6538 metres, before his team succumbed to malaria. In 1947 he attempted Rakaposhi, then made his way to Kashgar to join up with Eric Shipton in a lightweight attempt on Muztagh Ata, 7546 metres, which nearly succeeded. On his way back to India, he detoured through Afghanistan's Wakhan Corridor to see the source of the river Oxus. In doing so, he traversed the Wakhjir Pass now marking the Afghanistan–China border, and is thought to be the last Westerner to have done so. During his extensive exploration of the areas of Langtang, Ganesh and Manang in Nepal in 1949, Tilman was the first to ascend Paldor, 5896 metres, and found the pass named after him beyond Gangchempo.

He was awarded in 1952 the Royal Geographical Society's Founder's Medal for his achievements.

== World War II ==
He volunteered for service in the Second World War; he first saw action during the Battle of France helping to cover the retreat in Flanders before getting to the beaches at Dunkirk. Tilman then served in North Africa, Iraq and Iran before being called on for special duty in 1943. He then was dropped by parachute into Albania behind enemy lines to fight with Albanian and Italian partisans. For his actions there he was awarded the Distinguished Service Order for his efforts, and was given the keys to the city of Belluno which he had helped save from occupation and destruction.

== Sailing / mountain exploration ==
Following his military career behind enemy lines in the Second World War, Tilman took up deep sea sailing. Sailing in deep seas on the Bristol Channel Pilot Cutter Mischief, which he purchased in 1954, and subsequently on his other pilot cutters Sea Breeze and Baroque, Tilman voyaged to Arctic and Antarctic waters in search of new and uncharted mountains to climb.

On his last voyage in 1977, in his eightieth year, Tilman was invited to ship as crew in En Avant with mountaineers sailing to the South Atlantic to climb Smith Island. The expedition was led, and the boat skippered, by the youthful Simon Richardson. He and his crew aboard the old, converted steel tug made it successfully and without incident to Rio de Janeiro. Thereafter, en route to the Falkland Islands, they disappeared without trace. It is presumed the ship had foundered with all hands.

== Chronological summary of expeditions ==
- 1929: Tilman is introduced to rock climbing in the Lake District of England.
- 1930: He ascends Mawenzi and almost ascends Kibo on Kilimanjaro, with Eric Shipton.
- 1930: He makes first ascent of West Ridge of Batian, and traverses to Nelion, with Shipton.
- 1932: Tilman ascends Mounts Speke, Baker, and Stanley in the Ruwenzori Range, with Shipton.
- 1932: In April, he is involved in an accident in the Lake District which leads to the death of J. S. Brogdon.
- 1932: Later that year, he makes various climbs in the Alps.
- 1933: Tilman ascends Kilimanjaro (to summit) alone.
- 1934: Tilman and Shipton, with three others, make the first recorded entrance into the Nanda Devi Sanctuary. They also explore the nearby Badrinath Range.
- 1935: Tilman unable to acclimatise on the Mount Everest reconnaissance expedition led by Eric Shipton, but climbs various 20,000 ft. peaks in the Everest region.
- 1936: Tilman attempts various peaks and passes, including the Zemu Gap, in Sikkim, near Kangchenjunga. Later, he leads the first ascent of Nanda Devi.
- 1937: Shipton and Tilman make a major reconnaissance and surveying expedition in the Karakoram.
- 1938: Tilman leads another Mount Everest expedition; he and three others reach above 27,300 ft (8,320 m) but fail to reach the summit.
- 1938: He traverses the Zemu Gap.
- 1939: He leads an expedition in the remote Assam Himalaya, which ends in disaster. They attempt Gori Chen, but reach only the lower slopes. The party was ravaged by Malaria, causing the death of one member.
- 1941: Tilman climbs various peaks in Kurdistan.
- 1942: He makes a night ascent of Zaghouan, in Tunisia.
- 1947: Tilman leads an attempt on Rakaposhi which explores five different routes, none of which get near the summit. The expedition then explored the Kukuay Glacier on the southwest side of the Batura Muztagh.
- 1947: He attempts Muztagh Ata, with Shipton and Gyalgen Sherpa.
- 1948: Tilman attempts Bogda Feng, in northern Xinjiang, with Shipton and two others, but they only reach outlying summits.
- 1948: He attempts Chakragil, in western Xinjiang.
- 1948: He travels in the Chitral area of the Hindu Kush.
- 1949: Tilman leads a four-month exploratory and scientific expedition to the Langtang, Ganesh, and Jugal Himals in Nepal, in the early stages of that country's re-opening to outsiders. He climbs Paldor in the Ganesh Himal.
- 1950: He leads the British Annapurna Expedition, which gets close to the summit of Annapurna IV, and attempts other nearby peaks.
- 1950: Tilman and Charles Houston view Mount Everest from the lower slopes of Pumori, on the recently opened Nepalese side of the peak.
- 1955 – 12 months, 20,000 miles: First voyage in Mischief. Together with Jorge Quinteros he performs the first longitudinal crossing of the Southern Patagonian Ice Field.
- 1957 – 12 months, 21,000 miles, circumnavigation of the African continent
- 1959 – 12 months, 20,000 miles, South Atlantic, Iles Crozet
- 1961 – 4 months, 7,500 miles, West Greenland - Upernavik region
- 1962 – 4 months, 6,500 miles, West Greenland and Baffin Island
- 1963 – 4 months, 7,000 miles, Bylot Island, Baffin Bay
- 1964 – 4 months, 3,700 miles, East Greenland
- 1964 – 5 months, 10,000 miles, skippering the schooner Patanela to Heard Island in the Southern Ocean
- 1965 – 4 months, 4,000 miles, East Greenland - Return visit
- 1966 – 12 months, 20,400 miles, Islands of the Southern Ocean
- 1968 – 3 months, 2,500 miles, East Greenland, Jan Mayen, Loss of Mischief
- 1969 – 4 months, 3,400 miles, first voyage in Sea Breeze - East Greenland
- 1970 – 4 months, 5,000 miles, South West Greenland - Faeringehavn, Julianhaab, Nanortalik, Torsukatak
- 1971 – 4 months, 5,000 miles, Faroe Islands, Iceland, East Greenland - Angmassalik
- 1972 – 3 months, 3,000 miles, East Greenland, Loss of Sea Breeze
- 1973 – 4 months, 5,000 miles, First voyage in Baroque, to West Greenland.
- 1974 – 4 months, 7,000 miles, circumnavigation of Spitzbergen
- 1975 – 4 months, 5,000 miles, West Greenland
- 1976 – 4 months, East Greenland - Angmagssalik - Reykjavik
- 1977 - 1 month, Reykjavik-Lymington
- 1977 – 4 months (?), Carried as crew/navigator on Simon Richardson's En Avant from Southampton to Las Palmas then Rio de Janeiro. Vessel presumed lost at sea en route to the Falkland Islands with loss of all hands.

H.W.Tilman, the seven Mountain Travel Books

H.W.Tilman, the eight Sailing / Mountain exploration Books

== Resources ==
=== Books ===
- H. W. Tilman: The Collected Edition (Vertebrate Publishing and Lodestar Books, 2016–17), comprising:
  - Snow on the Equator (1937) ISBN 9781909461147
  - The Ascent of Nanda Devi (1937) ISBN 9781909461185
  - When Men and Mountains Meet (1946) ISBN 9781909461222
  - Mount Everest 1938 (1948) ISBN 9781909461260
  - Two Mountains and a River (1949) ISBN 9781909461307
  - China to Chitral (1951) ISBN 9781909461345
  - Nepal Himalaya (1952) ISBN 9781909461383
  - Mischief in Patagonia (1957) ISBN 9781909461161
  - Mischief among the Penguins (1961) ISBN 9781909461208
  - Mischief in Greenland (1964) ISBN 9781909461246
  - Mostly Mischief (1966) ISBN 9781909461284
  - Mischief Goes South (1968) ISBN 9781909461321
  - In Mischief's Wake (1971) ISBN 9781909461369
  - Ice With Everything (1974) ISBN 9781909461406
  - Triumph and Tribulation (1977) ISBN 9781909461420
- Eric Shipton, The Six Mountain-Travel Books (Mountaineers Books, 1997), ISBN 0-89886-539-5.
- H. W. Tilman, Mount Everest 1938 (Pilgrims Publishing) ISBN 81-7769-175-9 (contains the Appendix B on the Yeti)
- H. W. Tilman, Nepal Himalaya (Pilgrims Publishing) ISBN 81-7303-107-X
- H. W. Tilman, The Seven Mountain-Travel Books (Mountaineers' Books) ISBN 0-89886-960-9, comprising:
  - Snow on the Equator (1937)
  - The Ascent of Nanda Devi (1937)
  - When Men and Mountains Meet (1946)
  - Everest 1938 (1948)
  - Two Mountains and a River (1949)
  - China to Chitral (1951)
  - Nepal Himalaya (1952)
- H. W. Tilman, Eight Sailing/Mountain-Exploration Books (Diadem Books) ISBN 0-89886-143-8, comprising:
  - Mischief in Patagonia (1957)
  - Mischief among the Penguins (1961)
  - Mischief in Greenland (1964)
  - Mostly Mischief (1966)
  - Mischief Goes South (1968)
  - In Mischief's Wake (1971)
  - Ice With Everything (1974)
  - Triumph and Tribulation (1977)

== See also ==
- List of people who disappeared mysteriously at sea
