= Pilgrims Book House =

Indian and Nepali bookshop and publisher

- Pilgrims Book House company logo
- Founded: 1984
- Founder: Ramanand "Rama" Tiwari
- Country of origin: Nepal
- Headquarters location: B 27/98 A-8 Nawabganj Gali, Durgakund, Varanasi
- Distribution: Worldwide
- Nonfiction topics: Buddhism, Hinduism, Travel, Mountaineering, India, Nepal, Tibet, Languages
- Official website: https://www.pilgrimsonlineshop.com

Pilgrims Book House is a publishing and bookselling company founded in Kathmandu, Nepal in 1984. It formerly published books under the Book Faith India imprint and now publishes under the Pilgrims Publishing imprint. Pilgrims Book House is currently headquartered in Varanasi, India.

Pilgrims Book House sells and publishes books in a number of South Asian and Western languages. Its areas of speciality include:

- Buddhism
- Hinduism and yoga
- Mountaineering
- Reprints of classic books on India, Nepal, Tibet and Central Asia
- Languages (Nepali, Tibetan, Hindi)
- Children's books

== Company history ==
Pilgrims Book House was established by Puspa and Rama Nand ("Rama") Tiwari in Kathmandu in 1984, succeeding the Tiwaris' earlier book business in Varanasi. In the year 1999 they started a branch in Varanasi, and in 2006 a second branch opened in Delhi.

For many years the main Pilgrims Book House bookshop branch in Kathmandu was located in Thamel. It was one of the largest bookshops in Asia with hundreds of thousands of books on display. It was praised by several travel guidebooks and websites (including by Lonely Planet who called it "Kathmandu's best bookstore").

On 16 May 2013 the Thamel branch of Pilgrims Book House caught fire and almost everything inside was burnt to ashes. Since the fire Pilgrims has operated two bookshops, one at JP Road, Thamel, Kathmandu and the other at Durgakund, Varanasi. Following a trading downturn for two years due to the corona virus epidemic, business began to pick up in 2022.

Pilgrims operates two websites, one for its bookstores and the other for its publishing division. The company also maintains a rare books department.

== Publications ==
Pilgrims Book House has published more than 1700 books. These include:

- Paul Brunton, A Message from Arunachala, Pilgrims Publishing, 2009, ISBN 978-81-7769-785-8.
- W. Y. Evans-Wentz, The Tibetan Book of the Dead, Pilgrims Publishing, 2010, ISBN 81-7769-099-X.
- Jim Goodman, Pokhara in the Shadow of the Annapurnas, Book Faith India, 1997, with photos by Galen Rowell and John Everingham, ISBN 974-89765-4-8.
- Eva Kipp, Bending Bamboo Changing Winds: Nepali Women Tell Their Life Stories, Pilgrims Publishing, 2006, ISBN 81-7769-451-0.
- B. P. Koirala, Faulty Glasses and Other Stories, Pilgrims Publishing, 2002, ISBN 81-7303-055-3.
- James Prinsep and O. P. Kejariwal, "Benares Illustrated" and "James Prinsep and Benares" , Pilgrims Publishing, 2009, ISBN 81-7769-400-6.
- A. P. Sinnett, Esoteric Buddhism, Pilgrims Publishing, 2002, ISBN 81-7769-432-4.
- J. R. Santiago, Kriya Yoga: The Science of Self-Realization, Book Faith India, 1999, ISBN 81-7303-184-3.
- Tania Sironic, Thangka Coloring Book. Pilgrims Publishing, 2007, ISBN 978-81-7769-644-8.
- Daisetz Teitaro Suzuki, The Lankavatara Sutra, Pilgrims Publishing, 2005, ISBN 81-7769-298-4.
- H. W. Tilman, Mount Everest 1938, Pilgrims Publishing, 2004, ISBN 81-7769-175-9 (contains the infamous Appendix B on the Yeti).
- B. D. Tripathi, Sadhus of India, Pilgrims Publishing, 2004, ISBN 81-7769-631-9.
- Geert Verbeki, Bowls: An ABC. Pilgrims Publishing, 2005, ISBN 81-7769-223-2.
- David Paul Wagner, Hindi Phrasebook: A Pilgrims Key to Hindi, Pilgrims Publishing, 1999, ISBN 81-7769-222-4.

== Book series ==
- Everest Series
- Pilgrims Astrology Series
- Pilgrims Colouring Book Series
- Pilgrims Folk Tales
- Pilgrims Health Series
- Pilgrims Key - language phrasebooks
- Pilgrims Pocket Classics
- Pilgrims Pocket Series
- Pilgrims Quotation Series
