= Dhammapada =

Collection of sayings of the Buddha in verse form

- SuttaCentral; OpenTipitaka
- Type: Canonical text
- Parent: Khuddaka Nikāya
- Attribution: Bhāṇaka
- Aṭṭhakathā: Dhammapada-aṭṭhakathā
- Commentator: Buddhaghosa
- Abbreviation: Dhp; Dp

Translations of
- Burmese: ဓမ္မပဒ
- Chinese: 法句經 法句经 (Simplified) (Pinyin: fǎjù jīng)
- Japanese: 法句経/ダンマパダ (Rōmaji: hokkugyō/danmapada)
- Khmer: ធម្មបទ (UNGEGN: thômmôbât)
- Korean: 법구경/담마 파다 (RR: beobgugyeong/damma pada)
- Sinhala: ධම්මපදය
- Thai: ธรรมบท
- Vietnamese: Kinh Pháp Cú
- Prakrit: धम्मपद Dhammapada

The Dhammapada (Pali: धम्मपद; Sanskrit: धर्मपद, romanized: Dharmapada) is a collection of sayings of the Buddha in verse form and one of the most widely read and best known Buddhist scriptures. The original version of the Dhammapada is in the Khuddaka Nikāya, a division of the Pāli Canon of Theravāda Buddhism.

The Buddhist scholar and commentator Buddhaghosa explains that each saying recorded in the collection was made on a different occasion in response to a unique situation that had arisen in the life of the Buddha and his monastic community. His translation of the commentary, the Dhammapada Aṭṭhakatha, presents the details of these events and is a rich source of legend for the life and times of the Buddha.

== Etymology ==
The title "Dhammapada" is a compound term composed of dhamma and pada, each word having a number of denotations and connotations. Generally, dhamma can refer to the Buddha's "doctrine" or an "eternal truth" or "righteousness" or all "phenomena"; at its root, pada means "foot" and thus by extension, especially in this context, means either "path" or "verse" (cf. prosodic foot) or both. English translations of this text's title have used various combinations of these and related words.

== History ==
According to tradition, the Dhammapada's verses were spoken by the Buddha on various occasions. Glenn Wallis states: "By distilling the complex models, theories, rhetorical style and sheer volume of the Buddha's teachings into concise, crystalline verses, the Dhammapada makes the Buddhist way of life available to anyone...In fact, it is possible that the very source of the Dhammapada in the third century B.C.E. is traceable to the need of the early Buddhist communities in India to laicize the ascetic impetus of the Buddha's original words." The text is part of the Khuddaka Nikāya of the Sutta Piṭaka, although over half of the verses exist in other parts of the Pāli Canon. A 4th or 5th century CE commentary attributed to Buddhaghosa includes 305 stories which give context to the verses.

The Pāli Dhammapada is one of the most popular pieces of Theravāda literature. Its oldest available manuscripts date to 1500 CE. A compiler is not named. A critical edition of the Dhammapada in Latin was produced by Danish scholar Viggo Fausbøll in 1855, becoming the first Pāli text to receive this kind of examination by the European academic community.

=== Parallels ===
Although the Pāli edition is the best-known, a number of other versions are known:

- "Gāndhārī Dharmapada" – a version possibly of Dharmaguptaka or Kāśyapīya origin in Gāndhārī written in Kharosthi script
- "Patna Dharmapada" – a version in Buddhist Hybrid Sanskrit, most likely of the Sāmatiya sect
- "Udānavarga" – a seemingly related Mula-Sarvāstivāda or Sarvāstivāda text in
  - 3 Sanskrit versions
  - a Tibetan translation, which is popular in traditional Tibetan Buddhism
- "Mahāvastu" – a Lokottaravāda text with parallels to verses in the Pāli Dhammapada's Sahassa Vagga and Bhikkhu Vagga.
- "Fajujing 法句经" – 4 Chinese works; one of these appears to be an expanded translation of the Pāli version; this has not traditionally been very popular.
  - The Faju jing – translated and compiled by Weizhinan in 224 CE
  - The Faju piyu jing – compiled by Faju and Fali between 290-306 CE
  - The Chuyao jing – translated by Zhu Fonian in 383 CE
  - The Faju yaosong jing – translated by Tianxizai between 980-999 CE

Comparing the Pāli Dhammapada, the Gāndhārī Dharmapada and the Udānavarga, Brough (2001) identifies that the texts have in common 330 to 340 verses, 16 chapter headings and an underlying structure. He suggests that the three texts have a "common ancestor" but underlines that there is no evidence that any one of these three texts might have been the "primitive Dharmapada" from which the other two evolved.

== Organization ==
The Pāli Dhammapada contains 423 verses in 26 chapters (listed in Pāli and English):

Ch.	Pali	English
1	Yamaka-vaggo	The Pairs (see excerpt below)
2	Appamāda-vaggo	Heedfulness
3	Citta-vaggo	The Mind
4	Puppha-vaggo	Flowers
5	Bāla-vaggo	Fools (excerpt)
6	Paṇḍita-vaggo	The Wise
7	Arahanta-vaggo	The Arahats
8	Sahassa-vaggo	The Thousands
9	Pāpa-vaggo	Wickedness
10	Daṇḍa-vaggo	The Stick (excerpt)
11	Jarā-vaggo	Old Age
12	Atta-vaggo	The Self (excerpt)
13	Loka-vaggo	The World (excerpt)
14	Buddha-vaggo	The Buddha (excerpt)
15	Sukha-vaggo	Happiness
16	Piya-vaggo	Love
17	Kodha-vaggo	Anger
18	Mala-vaggo	Stains
19	Dhammaṭṭha-vaggo	One who stands by Dhamma
20	Magga-vaggo	The Path (excerpt)
21	Pakiṇṇaka-vaggo	Miscellaneous
22	Niraya-vaggo	The Underworld
23	Nāga-vaggo	The Elephant
24	Taṇhā-vaggo	Craving (excerpt)
25	Bhikkhu-vaggo	Monastics
26	Brāhmaṇa-vaggo	Brahmins

Many of the themes within the Dhammapada are dichotomous. For example, contrasts between joy and suffering, virtuous action and misconduct, and truth and deceit recur throughout the text.

== Excerpts ==
The following Pāli verses and corresponding English translations are from Ānandajoti (2017), which also contains explanatory footnotes.

=== Chapter 1: Pairs (Yamakavaggo) ===
1.
Mind precedes thoughts, mind is their chief, their quality is made by mind,
if with a base mind one speaks or acts,
through that suffering follows him like a wheel follows the ox's foot.^{1}
Manopubbaṅgamā dhammā, manoseṭṭhā manomayā,
manasā ce paduṭṭhena bhāsati vā karoti vā,
tato naṁ dukkham-anveti cakkaṁ va vahato padaṁ.
2.
Mind precedes thoughts, mind is their chief, their quality is made by mind,
if with pure mind one speaks or acts,
through that happiness follows him like a shadow which does not depart.
Manopubbaṅgamā dhammā, manoseṭṭhā manomayā,
manasā ce pasannena bhāsati vā karoti vā,
tato naṁ sukham-anveti chāyā va anapāyinī.
5.
For not by hatred do hatreds cease at any time in this place,
they only cease with non-hatred, this truth is surely eternal.
Na hi verena verāni sammantīdha kudācanaṁ,
averena ca sammanti, esa dhammo sanantano.

The translation of this simile is debated. Suddhaso Bhikku interprets the simile as "just as a track follows a wheel." He argues that other interpretations involve adding words that are not a direct translation of the original text. Specifically, cakkaṁ means wheel, va means as, vahato means following, and padaṁ means track, path, or foot.

=== Chapter 10: The Stick (Daṇḍavaggo) ===
131.
One who harms with a stick beings who desire happiness,
while seeking happiness for himself, won't find happiness after death.
Sukhakāmāni bhūtāni yo daṇḍena vihiṁsati, attano sukham-esāno, pecca so na labhate sukhaṁ.
132.
One who harms not with a stick beings who desire happiness,
while seeking happiness for himself, will find happiness after death.
Sukhakāmāni bhūtāni yo daṇḍena na hiṁsati,
attano sukham-esāno, pecca so labhate sukhaṁ.
133.
Do not say anything harsh, spoken to they might answer back to you,
for arrogant talk entails misery, and they might strike you back with a stick.
Māvoca pharusaṁ kañci, vuttā paṭivadeyyu' taṁ,
dukkhā hi sārambhakathā, paṭidaṇḍā phuseyyu' taṁ.

=== Chapter 12: The Self (Attavaggo) ===
157.
If one regards oneself as dear one should guard oneself right well,
during one of the three watches of the night the wise one should stay alert.
Attānañ-ce piyaṁ jaññā rakkheyya naṁ surakkhitaṁ,
tiṇṇam-aññataraṁ yāmaṁ paṭijaggeyya paṇḍito.
158.
First one should establish oneself in what is suitable,
then one can advise another, the wise one should not have any defilement.
Attānam-eva paṭhamaṁ patirūpe nivesaye,
athaññam-anusāseyya, na kilisseyya paṇḍito.
159.
He should do himself as he would advise another to do,
being well-trained, he could surely train another, for it is said the self is difficult to train.
Attānañ-ce tathā kayirā yathaññam-anusāsati,
sudanto vata dametha, attā hi kira duddamo.
160.
For the self is the friend of self, for what other friend would there be?

When the self is well-trained, one finds a friend that is hard to find.

Attā hi attano nātho, ko hi nātho paro siyā?Attanā va sudantena nāthaṁ labhati dullabhaṁ.
161.
That wickedness done by oneself, born in oneself, arising in oneself,
crushes the one who is stupid, as a diamond crushes a rock-jewel.
Attanā va kataṁ pāpaṁ, attajaṁ attasambhavaṁ,
abhimatthati dummedhaṁ vajiraṁ vasmamayaṁ maṇiṁ.
162.
The one who has an exceeding lack of virtue, like a deadly creeper covering a Sal tree,
makes himself the same as his enemy wishes him to be.
Yassa accantadussīlyaṁ, māluvā Sālam-ivotataṁ,
karoti so tathattānaṁ yathā naṁ icchatī diso.
163.
Easily done are things not good, and unbeneficial for oneself,
but that which is beneficial and good is supremely hard to do.
Sukarāni asādhūni, attano ahitāni ca,
yaṁ ve hitañ-ca sādhuñ-ca taṁ ve paramadukkaraṁ.
164.
Whoever reviles the worthy teaching of the Noble Ones who live by Dhamma,
that stupid one, depending on wicked views,
like the bamboo when it bears fruit, brings about his own destruction.
Yo sāsanaṁ arahataṁ Ari yānaṁ Dhammajīvinaṁ
paṭikkosati dummedho diṭṭhiṁ nissāya pāpikaṁ,
phalāni kaṭṭhakasseva attaghaññāya phallati.
165.
By oneself alone is a wicked deed done, by oneself is one defiled,
by oneself is a wicked deed left undone, by oneself is one purified,
purity and impurity come from oneself, for no one can purify another.
Attanā va kataṁ pāpaṁ, attanā saṅkilissati,
attanā akataṁ pāpaṁ, attanā va visujjhati,
suddhī asuddhī paccattaṁ, nāñño aññaṁ visodhaye.
166.
One should not neglect one's own good for another's, however great;
knowing what is good for oneself one should be intent on that good.
Atta-d-atthaṁ paratthena bahunā pi na hāpaye;
atta-d-attham-abhiññāya sa-d-atthapasuto siyā.

=== Chapter 13: The World (Lokavaggo) ===
167.
One should not follow lowly things, one should not abide heedlessly,
one should not follow a wrong view, one should not foster worldliness.
Hīnaṁ dhammaṁ na seveyya, pamādena na saṁvase,
micchādiṭṭhiṁ na seveyya, na siyā lokavaḍḍhano.

=== Chapter 14: The Buddha (Buddhavaggo) ===
183.
The non-doing of anything wicked, undertaking of what is good,
the purification of one's mind - this is the teaching of the Buddhas.
Sabbapāpassa akaraṇaṁ, kusalassa upasampadā,
sacittapariyodapanaṁ - etaṁ Buddhāna' sāsanaṁ.

=== Chapter 19: The One who stands by Dhamma (Dhammaṭṭhavaggo) ===
270.
Through not hurting breathing beings one is noble (Aryan), the one who does not hurt any breathing beings is truly said to be noble (Aryan).
Na tena ariyo hoti yena pāṇāni hiṁsati, ahiṁsā sabbapāṇānaṁ ariyo ti pavuccati.

=== Chapter 20: The Path (Maggavaggo) ===
276.
Your duty is to have ardour declare the Realised Ones,
entering this path meditators will be released from the bonds of Māra.
Tumhehi kiccaṁ ātappaṁ akkhātāro Tathāgatā,
paṭipannā pamokkhanti jhāyino Mārabandhanā.
277.
All conditions are impermanent, when one sees this with wisdom,
then one grows tired of suffering – this is the path to purity.
Sabbe saṅkhārā aniccā ti, yadā paññāya passati,
atha nibbindatī dukkhe – esa maggo visuddhiyā.
278.
All conditions are suffering, when one sees this with wisdom,
then one grows tired of suffering – this is the path to purity.
Sabbe saṅkhārā dukkhā ti, yadā paññāya passati,
atha nibbindatī dukkhe – esa maggo visuddhiyā.
279.
All components of mind and body are without self, when one sees this with wisdom,
then one grows tired of suffering – this is the path to purity.
Sabbe dhammā anattā ti, yadā paññāya passati,
atha nibbindatī dukkhe – esa maggo visuddhiyā.

=== Chapter 24: Craving (Taṇhāvaggo) ===
343.
People surrounded by craving
crawl round like a hare in a trap,
therefore he should remove craving –
the monk who longs for dispassion for himself.
Tasiṇāya purakkhatā pajā
parisappanti saso va bādhito,
tasmā tasiṇaṁ vinodaye –
bhikkhu ākaṅkha' virāgam-attano.
350.
Whoever has delight in the calming of thoughts,
who always mindfully cultivates what is unattractive,
will surely abolish this craving,
he will cut off the bond of Māra.
Vitakkupasame ca yo rato
asubhaṁ bhāvayatī sadā sato,
esa kho vyantikāhiti,
esacchecchati Mārabandhanaṁ.

== English translations ==
See also online translations listed in External links.

- Daniel Gogerly, printed the first English translation of Dhammapada, comprising verses 1–255 in 1840 in Ceylon.
- Tr F. Max Müller, from Pali, 1870; reprinted in Sacred Books of the East, volume X, Clarendon/Oxford, 1881; reprinted in Buddhism, by Clarence Hamilton; reprinted separately by Watkins, 2006; reprinted 2008 by Red and Black Publishers, St Petersburg, Florida, ISBN 978-1-934941-03-4; the first complete English translation; (there was a Latin translation by V. Fausböll in 1855).
- Tr J. Gray, American Mission Press, Rangoon, 1881
- Tr J. P. Cooke & O. G. Pettis, Boston (Massachusetts?), 1898
- Hymns of Faith, tr Albert J. Edmunds, Open Court, Chicago, & Kegan Paul, Trench, Trübner & Co., London, 1902
- Tr Norton T. W. Hazeldine, Denver, Colorado, 1902
- The Buddha's Way of Virtue, tr W. D. C. Wagiswara & K. J. Saunders, John Murray, London, 1912
- Tr Silacara, Buddhist Society, London, 1915
- Tr Suriyagoda Sumangala, in Ceylon Antiquary, 1915
- Tr A. P. Buddhadatta, Colombo Apothecaries, 1920?
- The Buddha's Path of Virtue, tr F. L. Woodward, Theosophical Publishing House, London & Madras, 1921
- In Buddhist Legends, tr E. W. Burlinghame, Harvard Oriental Series, 1921, 3 volumes; reprinted by Pali Text Society , Bristol; translation of the stories from the commentary, with the Dhammapada verses embedded
- Tr R. D. Shrikhande and/or P. L. Vaidya (according to different bibliographies; or did one publisher issue two translations in the same year?), Oriental Book Agency, Poona, 1923; includes Pali text
- "Verses on Dhamma", in Minor Anthologies of the Pali Canon, volume I, tr C. A. F. Rhys Davids, 1931, Pali Text Society, Bristol; verse translation; includes Pali text
- Tr N. K. Bhag(w?)at, Buddha Society, Bombay, 1931/5; includes Pali text
- The Way of Truth, tr S. W. Wijayatilake, Madras, 1934
- Tr Irving Babbitt, Oxford University Press, New York & London, 1936; revision of Max Müller
- Tr K. Gunaratana, Penang, Malaya, 1937
- The Path of the Eternal Law, tr Swami Premananda, Self-Realization Fellowship, Washington DC, 1942
- Tr Dhammajoti, Maha Bodhi Society, Benares, 1944
- Comp. Jack Austin, Buddhist Society, London, 1945
- Stories of Buddhist India, tr Piyadassi, 2 volumes, Moratuwa, Ceylon, 1949 & 1953; includes stories from the commentary
- (see article) Tr Sarvepalli Radhakrishnan, Oxford University Press, London, 1950; includes Pali text
- Collection of Verses on the Doctrine of the Buddha, comp Bhadragaka, Bangkok, 1952
- Tr T. Latter, Moulmein, Burma, 1950?
- Tr W. Somalokatissa, Colombo, 1953
- Tr Narada, John Murray, London, 1954
- Tr E. W. Adikaram, Colombo, 1954
- Tr A. P. Buddhadatta, Colombo, 1954; includes Pali text
- Tr Siri Sivali, Colombo, 1954
- Tr ?, Cunningham Press, Alhambra, California, 1955
- Tr C. Kunhan Raja, Theosophical Publishing House, Adyar/Madras, 1956; includes Pali text
- Free rendering and interpretation by Wesley La Violette, Los Angeles, 1956
- Tr Buddharakkhita, Maha Bodhi Society, Bangalore, 1959; 4th edn, Buddhist Publication Society, Kandy, Sri Lanka, 1996; includes Pali text
- Tr Suzanne Karpelès, serialized in Advent (Pondicherry, India), 1960–65; reprinted in Questions and Answers, Collected Works of the Mother, 3, Pondicherry, 1977
- Growing the Bodhi Tree in the Garden of the Heart, tr Khantipalo, Buddhist Association of Thailand, Bangkok, 1966; reprinted as The Path of Truth, Bangkok, 1977
- Tr P. Lal, New York, 1967/70
- Tr Juan Mascaró, Penguin Classics, 1973
- Tr Thomas Byrom, Shambhala, Boston, Massachusetts, & Wildwood House, London, 1976 (ISBN 0-87773-966-8)
- Tr Ananda Maitreya, serialized in Pali Buddhist Review, 1 & 2, 1976/7; offprinted under the title Law Verses, Colombo, 1978; revised by Rose Kramer (under the Pali title), originally published by Lotsawa Publications in 1988, reprinted by Parallax Press in 1995
- The Buddha's Words, tr Sathienpong Wannapok, Bangkok, 1979
- Wisdom of the Buddha, tr Harischandra Kaviratna, Pasadena, 1980; includes Pali text
- The Eternal Message of Lord Buddha, tr Silananda, Calcutta, 1982; includes Pali text
- Tr Chhi Med Rig Dzin Lama, Institute of Higher Tibetan Studies, Sarnath, India, 1982; tr from the modern Tibetan translation by dGe-'dun Chos-'phel; includes Pali & Tibetan texts
- Tr & pub Dharma Publishing, Berkeley, California, 1985; tr from the modern Tibetan translation by dGe-'dun Chos-'phel
- Commentary, with text embedded, tr Department of Pali, University of Rangoon, published by Union Buddha Sasana Council, Rangoon (date uncertain; 1980s)
- Tr Daw Mya Tin, Burma Pitaka Association, Rangoon, 1986; probably currently published by the Department for the Promotion and Propagation of the Sasana, Rangoon, and/or Sri Satguru, Delhi
- Path of Righteousness, tr David J. Kalupahana, Universities Press of America, Lanham, Maryland, c. 1986
- Tr Raghavan Iyer, Santa Barbara, 1986; includes Pali text
- (see article) Tr Eknath Easwaran, Arkana, London, 1986/7(ISBN 978-1-58638-019-9); reissued with new material Nilgiri Press 2007, Tomales, CA (ISBN 9781586380205)
- Tr John Ross Carter & Mahinda Palihawadana, Oxford University Press, New York, 1987; the original hardback edition also includes the Pali text and the commentary's explanations of the verses; the paperback reprint in the World's Classics Series omits these
- Tr U. D. Jayasekera, Colombo, 1992
- Treasury of Truth, tr Weragoda Sarada, Taipei, 1993
- Tr Thomas Cleary, Thorsons, London, 1995
- The Word of the Doctrine, tr K. R. Norman, 1997, Pali Text Society, Bristol; the PTS's preferred translation
- Intro/Ed. Anne Bancroft (Tr Byrom), Element Books, Shaftesbury, Dorset, & Richport, Massachusetts, 1997
- The Dhammapada: The Buddha's Path of Wisdom, tr Buddharakkhita, Buddhist Publication Society, 1998. (ISBN 9-55240-131-3)
- The Way of Truth, tr Sangharakshita, Windhorse Publications, Birmingham, 2001
- Tr F. Max Müller (see above), revised Jack Maguire, SkyLight Pubns, Woodstock, Vermont, 2002
- Tr Glenn Wallis, Modern Library, New York, 2004 (ISBN 978-0-8129-7727-1); The Dhammapada: Verses on the Way
- Tr Gil Fronsdal, Shambhala, Boston, Massachusetts, 2005 (ISBN 1-59030-380-6)
- Tr Bhikkhu Varado, Inward Path, Malaysia, 2007; Dhammapada in English Verse

== Musical settings ==
- Ronald Corp's 2010 a cappella choral setting of Francis Booth's translation, released on Stone Records
- "Dhammapada - Sacred Teachings of the Buddha." Hariprasad Chaurasia & Rajesh Dubey. 2018 - Freespirit Records

== Sources ==
- Ānandajoti, Bhikkhu (2007). A Comparative Edition of the Dhammapada. U. of Peradeniya. Ancient Buddhist Texts Retrieved 25 Nov 2008.
- Ānandajoti, Bhikkhu (2017). Dhammapada: Dhamma Verses, 2nd edition. Ancient Buddhist Texts Retrieved 1 May 2022.
- Brough, John (2001). The Gāndhārī Dharmapada. Delhi: Motilal Banarsidass Publishers Private Limited.
- Buswell, Robert E. (ed.) (2003). Encyclopedia of Buddhism. MacMillan Reference Books. ISBN 978-0-02-865718-9.
- Cone, Margaret (transcriber) (1989). "Patna Dharmapada" in the Journal of the Pali Text Society (Vol. XIII), pp. 101–217. Oxford: PTS. Online text interspersed with Pali parallels compiled by Ānandajoti Bhikkhu (2007). Ancient Buddhist Texts Retrieved 06-15-2008.
- Easwaran, Eknath (2007) (see article). The Dhammapada. Nilgiri Press. ISBN 978-1-58638-020-5.
- Fronsdal, Gil (2005). The Dhammapada. Boston: Shambhala. ISBN 1-59030-380-6.
- Geiger, Wilhelm (trans. by Batakrishna Ghosh) (1943, 2004). Pāli Literature and Language. New Delhi: Munshiram Manoharlal Publishers. ISBN 81-215-0716-2.
- Harvey, Peter (1990, 2007). An Introduction to Buddhism: Teachings, History and Practices. Cambridge: Cambridge University Press. ISBN 0-521-31333-3.
- Hinüber, Oskar von (2000). A Handbook of Pāli Literature. Berlin: Walter de Gruyter. ISBN 3-11-016738-7.
- Müller, F. Max (1881). The Dhammapada (Sacred Books Of The East, Vol. X). Oxford University Press.
- Ñāṇamoli, Bhikkhu (trans.) & Bhikkhu Bodhi (ed.) (2001). The Middle Length Discourses of the Buddha: A Translation of the Majjhima Nikāya. Boston: Wisdom Publications. ISBN 0-86171-072-X.
- Rhys Davids, T.W. & William Stede (eds.) (1921-5). The Pali Text Society's Pali–English Dictionary. Chipstead: Pali Text Society. Search inside the Pali–English Dictionary, University of Chicago
