= Philip Novak =

Philosophy professor

Philosophical work
- Main interests: Buddhism
- Website: www.dominican.edu/press/expertsdirectory/religion.html

Philip Novak is a Sarlo Distinguished Professor of Philosophy and Religion at Dominican University in San Rafael, California. He received a bachelor's degree in English at University of Notre Dame (1972), and MA and PhD degrees in Religion at Syracuse University (1981). He joined the faculty of Dominican University in 1980. Novak has been Dean of the School of Arts, Humanities & Social Sciences.

== Publications ==
Books authored or edited by Novak include

- "The World's Wisdom," an anthology of the sacred texts of the world's religions (HarperSanFrancisco 1994)
- "The Vision of Nietzsche" (Vega, 1996)
- "Buddhism: A Concise Introduction" (co-authored with Huston Smith, HarperSanFrancisco 2002)
- "The Inner Journey: Views from the Buddhist Tradition" (Morning Light, 2005).
