= History of Oak Park and River Forest High School =

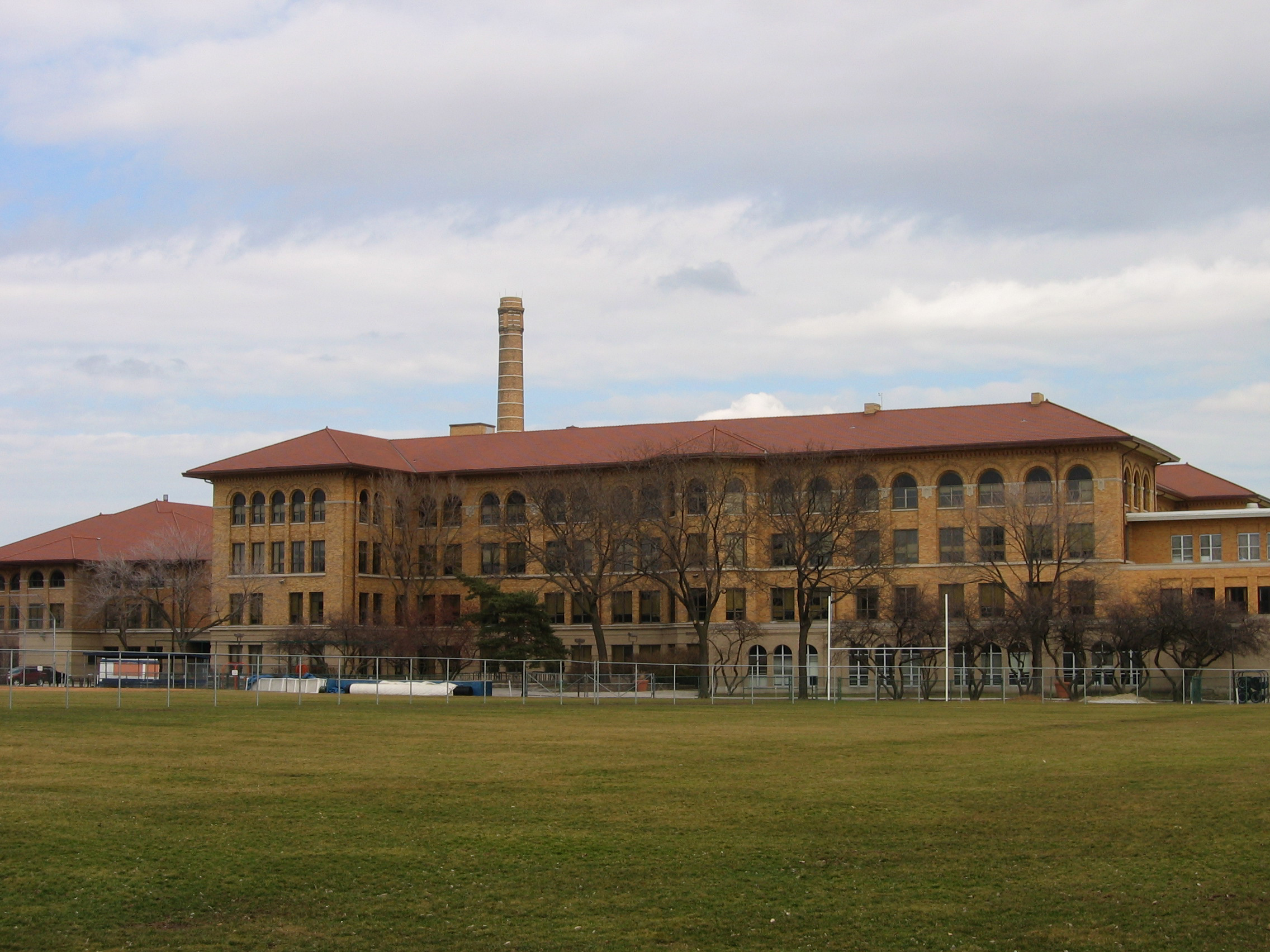
Oak Park and River Forest High School in 2006

The History of Oak Park and River Forest High School covers the history of Oak Park and River Forest High School, located in Oak Park, Illinois, United States, from 1871 to the present.

== History ==
=== Nineteenth century ===
Starting in 1871, high school students from Oak Park attended classes in an elementary school. The first class, which contained only three people, graduated in 1877. As early as 1875, there was discussion about constructing a high school in Oak Park.

In June 1889, the school board announced that a site on Lake Street between Euclid and East Avenues had been selected for the new high school. Construction began in the spring of 1890. The school was designed by the firm of Thomas & Rapp, and built for an initial cost of US$40,000. The school, Oak Park-Ridgeland High School, was opened for public inspection on the afternoon of January 1, 1892.

The building was designed for kindergarten and grades 5–12. Among the features of the building was a state-of-the-art ventilation system that changed the air in the entire building once every six minutes. The basement held industrial arts shops, and the third floor held the gymnasium, science labs, and cooking and sewing rooms.

The 15-member graduating class of 1894, grouped according to course work in "Classical", "Latin", or "Modern language", received a graduation address from John M. Coulter, then serving as president of Lake Forest University.

In 1899, the tuition charged to residents of River Forest and Maywood was raised, prompting the students from those towns to move their students to the recently completed Austin High School in Chicago.

=== 1901–1920 ===
By 1904, the towns decided a new high school building was needed. In December 1904, the location at East and Ontario Streets was selected by voters.

The original school site was sold in 1916 for $25,000.

A new building, designed to hold 800 students, was opened in 1907 in the school's current location; however, by 1908, the school was declared defective and required additional work, with the concrete floors specifically cited as being unable to support the full weight of potential people that might stand on it. The school eventually filed suit against the contractors.

For many years, students at the school had formed fraternities and sororities. In the wake of a student's near death during an initiation in 1907, the community's citizens began to ask for the secret organizations to be disbanded. In the summer of 1907, school officials formally informed parents of the school's opposition to these groups, and that parents should be wary about permitting students to join these groups. As school started in 1908, the school opted to require all students (unless parents were opposed) to sign an oath not to join any secret societies. With the pledges sent out, the secret societies were effectively banned at the school, though not without a fight. The adult sponsor of one fraternity (on whose property the fraternity's house was located) decided to defend the system. It soon became clear that the fight was between representatives of the "old guard" of Oak Park which favored the societies, and newer families who were against them. Even as the last sororities submitted to signing the oath, the fraternities held out hope that they and their parents would prevail. While continued existence of the fraternities was tolerated for a time, by early 1909, the last remaining members were expelled when they failed to comply with the oaths they had signed. After the last fraternity engaged the services of an attorney to defend themselves, the attorney informed the members and their families that the school was within its rights, leading the last holdouts to renounce their membership and rejoin the school community. Problems with secret societies continued sporadically into 1911, when students were again given the choice of renouncing membership in the groups or face expulsion. Nine students were ultimately expelled. Four of these boys applied to attend one of the public schools in Chicago, and were rejected. One of the nine students was eventually reinstated by a judge, who openly called these secret societies "enemies of the state and foes of our Christian civilization". Expulsions over the offense continued in 1915, though with the added twist of several girls gaining the support of Mrs. Catherine Wright, the wife of architect Frank Lloyd Wright. In 1916, parents supportive of secret societies attempted to get elected to the school board, but failed when the leadership withdrew from the election.

1908 saw approval for the expansion of the athletic facilities with five new tennis courts, a new quarter-mile cinder track, and outdoor basketball courts.

On January 16, 1914, the school opened its new field house, which ranked among the largest indoor athletic facilities for a secondary school in the country, including a one-fourteenth-of-a-mile indoor track.

During 1916 and 1917, Ernest Hemingway was a contributor to the school newspaper and literary magazine. Several of these works were collected in Hemingway at Oak Park High: The High School Writings of Ernest Hemingway, 1916-1917. Among these works was a short story, A Matter of Colour, which appears to be a prequel to his later short story The Killers, explaining the reason for the action in that story.

=== 1921–1940 ===
On September 27, 1924 OPRF dedicated its new athletic stadium with a celebration that included a 13–0 win in football over Austin High School.

The fight against secret societies among students again raised its head. In May 1926, the school issued one-year suspensions to 53 students under the claim that their Sunday school classes served as a front for fraternity membership. The boys filed suit against the school claiming that they did not know they would be punished so strongly, with one prominent parent claiming the school was acting to erase its image as an "athletic" school. When the boys won the case, they arrived at school to gain admittance, only to see the superintendent cancel classes so that students could attend a "clean alleys" parade. Upon appeal, the judge reversed his initial ruling, and denied the boys' lawsuit. Despite missing graduation for some students, the remaining students continued to appeal throughout the summer. On September 4, the parties arrived at a compromise where graduates would receive their diplomas, underclassmen would return to class, though students would be barred from extracurricular activities, and would be required to help root out secret societies. Parents who had started a petition drive against the principal were also required to destroy the petitions.

November 1927 saw the announcement of new construction. The first to be completed was a new gymnasium for girls and a fieldhouse for boys, including a dirt floor and an indoor track. One report stated that the school would thus have "the largest and most complete high school athletic layout in the world". These facilities, costing $750,000 were ready in August 1928.

OPRF routinely hosted community lecture events and several charitable fundraisers that attracted notable people. On the evening of November 9, 1936, the school hosted a talk by First Lady Eleanor Roosevelt.

On October 14, 1940, the school hosted the exiled Archduke Felix of Austria for a talk. On October 22, 1940, the school hosted Cornelia Otis Skinner, who presented some costumed monologues at the school as a part of a fundraiser for the local infant welfare society. A benefit concert at the school on November 8, 1940 featured violinist Efrem Zimbalist. January 22, 1941 saw a lecture by polar explorer Rear Admiral Richard Byrd.

=== 1941–1960 ===
With the outbreak of World War II, OPRF opened its doors to a University of Illinois sponsored war industries college to educate men and women in skills needed to perform in necessary industries.

At least as early as 1940, interest was shown in opening a second high school for the town of River Forest. In 1946, approval was given for River Forest to form its own high school district. By 1949, River Forest was still a separate district, but had not begun to build a high school, forcing the district to pay tuition for each student still attending Oak Park High School. In late May 1949, petitions were presented asking for a referendum to reunite the two districts, with the county superintendent announcing that the reunited school district would officially become Consolidated High School District 200 when the vote from both districts favored reunification. The successful election resulted in the call for the election of a new school board.

The 1940s saw still more lecturers and performers come to the school for various functions. October 12, 1942 saw a talk on "Liberty vs. Oppression" by Ève Curie, the daughter and biographer of Marie Curie. Carmen Amaya and her band of dancers performed October 16, 1942. Soprano Helen Jepson performed on March 24, 1944. Actress Ilka Chase gave a talk on April 21, 1944. October 11, 1944 saw a performance by magician Harlan Tarbell. Hypnotist and "mind reader" Dr. Franz Polgar was the entertainment at the school on April 25, 1945. In March 1946, the school hosted a two-day conference to discuss the future of the Soviet Union in world affairs which was chaired by William McGovern and Maynard C. Krueger. Eugene List performed on piano on October 29, 1946. Will Durant, philosopher and historian, gave a lecture on October 17, 1949.

The 1950–51 school year opened with a $200,000 renovation of the school's auditorium. While the auditorium's capacity dropped from 1,300 to 1,200, the renovations included a new stage and dressing rooms.

Two communities sending students to OPRF withdrew from the district in the early 1950s. Elmwood Park incorporated its own high school district and constructed Elmwood Park High School in 1954, while the east part of River Grove was incorporated into Leyden High School.

1954 saw an addition to the field house and an additional $200,000 in improvements.

In 1956, voters rejected a bond issue, which requested permission to raise $2.8 million for renovations and expansion. A $2 million bond issue was approved for renovations in 1957. A new wing including ten classrooms and a new library was finished in the spring of 1959.

The 1950s saw more notable lecturers and performers take to the stage at the school. Princess Ileana of Romania gave a talk about the effects of Communism on her country on October 8, 1951. Claude Rains performed readings of literature on October 19, 1953. The former crown prince of Austria, Otto von Habsburg lectured on Europe and world security on October 18, 1954. Lt. General Mark Clark discussed a recent book he had written on November 1, 1954, while Willy Ley talked about the new space program on February 7, 1955. Polar explorer and Carleton College president Laurence McKinley Gould spoke on October 28, 1957. Vance Packard, an author and social critic, talked about his book The Hidden Persuaders and American morality on November 17, 1958.

=== 1961–1980 ===
In July 1966, preliminary plans were announced for a US$5.7 million, 300,000-square-foot (28,000 m^{2}) addition and remodeling of the school, which would include three air conditioned floors, a 1,700-seat auditorium, a 400-seat theater, and a 200-seat forensics theater were all part of the plan. Bidding for the addition opened in September 1966. In conjunction with the new construction, the school received a US$1.5 million Title III grant to expand and redevelop the school library. Construction was underway by November, with the price tag now standing at US$10.4 million. The project was not complete when the district was required to ask the residents for a US$2.9 million bond issue, which was approved in December 1967. In 1967, there was discussion of the Oak Park Elementary School District merging with the high school district to form a unit district.

In the summer of 1969, the school's orchestra planned to take a 22-day, 8-city tour of Europe that was to include stops in Moscow and Leningrad, to become the first American high school orchestra to perform in the Soviet Union. However, the group's itinerary was forced to change. The tour included a concert in St Mark's Square and an audience with Pope Paul VI, as well as a concert at Beethovenhalle in Bonn. The tour to Moscow and Leningrad (and Amsterdam and Vienna) took place over the 1970-71 winter break.

In December 1976, voters approved a 77-cent-per-US$100 assessed property value increase to improve the school's educational fund.

The school continued to host several notable visitors. In February 1961, the school hosted alum Illinois Governor Otto Kerner, Jr. and General Alfred Gruenther on the topic of national goals. Congressman and staunch anti-communist Walter Judd spoke at the school in 1962. Broadway producers José Quintero and Theodore Mann presented the play Under Milk Wood in October 1962, followed a week later with a talk by Baroness Maria von Trapp, and in November with a talk on contemporary problems by U.S. Senator John Tower. In October 1963 the importance of education was the emphasis of a talk by former heavyweight boxing champion, Jack Dempsey. The remainder of 1963 and into 1964 saw visits from former Cincinnati mayor Charles Taft, MP Fergus Montgomery, naturalist and author Joy Adamson, and writer Art Buchwald. Winston Churchill, grandson of the British Prime Minister, spoke in 1965. The 1969-70 lecture season included talks by Percy Julian on the race crisis in America, Dr. David E. Smith on drug abuse, and Bruno Bettelheim on the generation gap. The 1970-71 lecture season included William F. Buckley, Jr., Roger Hilsman, and Bill Veeck. Senator Charles H. Percy lectured on current Congressional issues in October 1971. Governor Richard B. Ogilvie made a campaign stop at the school in 1972. March 1976 saw a performance by Count Basie and his Orchestra. Dr. Carolyn R. Payton, director of the Peace Corps spoke at a benefit hosted at the school in November 1978. On 1 October 1980, three days before the 1980 presidential election, Vice President Walter Mondale gave a talk to 1,000 students and a press conference at the school.

=== 1981 onward ===
In the autumn of 1983, the school inducted the first members of its alumni hall of fame.

1983 also saw OPRF among 32 Chicago-area school districts who had members of Lyndon LaRouche's National Democratic Policy Committee run for their school board. Among the changes these candidates supported are an end to "the hoax of new math", the end of all ecology classes, the elimination of non-classical music, and the end of vocational education classes. In Oak Park-River Forest, as with most of the districts, the candidates were not elected. By the 1990s, the concern over this, which began to include concerns over violence spreading from other schools, even required the hiring of private detectives to investigate student residency.

1983 also saw OPRF join a trend in identifying students (42 in 1983) who were nonresidents of the district (mostly from Chicago), and dismissing them. In some cases, this involved sending security guards to the local elevated train platforms to identify students arriving from the city.

The autumn of 1983 also saw the school caught up in the deportation of an employee of 25 years. In 1982, the school's head custodian, Reinhold Kulle, had admitted to the U.S. Justice Department that he had not been open about his tenure as a member of the Waffen-SS at the Gross-Rosen concentration camp during World War II. After the Justice Department's initial deportation hearings ended, the school opted to dismiss the custodian. While there was general community agreement, some opposed the dismissal (including at least one Jewish student), citing his exemplary behavior, caring for students, and hard work. The former custodian was deported to West Germany after his final appeal was denied by Supreme Court Justice John Paul Stevens in 1987. Kulle died in 2006. The board of trustees chose to not renew his contract and then allow him to collect retirement funds after a political conflict over whether to fire him. The school board decided that it had to remove Kulle after he was not candid in its interviews about his Nazi past.

Walter Mondale returned to the school as a presidential candidate, making a public call for Ronald Reagan to suspend underground nuclear testing.

Former U.S. Senator Adlai Stevenson III announced his second-time candidacy for Illinois governor during a speech at the school in October 1985.

In 1987, the school board considered a proposal that would have mandated testing for AIDS in any student (with parental notification) or staff member whom the superintendent had "reasonable cause" in being infected.

In 1989, the OPRF school board drafted a fourth revision of its anti-discrimination policy, and for the first time included sexual orientation as being protected from harassment. At the next board meeting, there were passionate voices both approving and disapproving of the new policy. In December, the board approved the policy, and became the first high school in Illinois to extend protection to homosexuals.

The 1990s saw the school go through financial difficulties. Sixty-eight employees, including tenured teachers, faced layoffs in 1991. By 1994, the school was facing a US$3 million deficit, and approached the voters to ask for an 18% tax hike to cover the deficit. By a 7,190–5,960 vote, the tax increase failed. While the money was needed, the board opted against moving too quickly for another tax referendum, and decided to not ask for a referendum in the November election. The school attempted a second tax increase referendum in the spring of 1996, this time asking for a 6.75% increase after having made US$5 million in cutbacks and emphasizing the reduction in workforce. Just weeks before the referendum, the district and teachers negotiated a contract which called for a partial wage freeze as well as the assumption of more health care costs by teachers. Days before the referendum, the Illinois State Board of Education announced that the school was on the state's "financial watch list". The referendum was successful.

In 1998, it was reported that the school was in need of US$18 million in repairs. The board responded by selling US$19 million in bonds to raise money to make repairs, including a new roof, general upgrades to come into compliance with the Americans with Disabilities Act, new ceilings, new windows, and new insulation. The monies would also be used for moving the tennis courts and baseball field, as well as demolition and reconstruction of the football stadium to give it a north–south orientation. As a part of the athletic field upgrades, the school was able to purchase neighboring property, and then went to court to secure more property from the village. The school paid US$800,000 for the property from the village.

Faculty representatives had negotiated the wage freeze and higher health care benefits because the school's teachers were not unionized. In 1998, as a result of these actions, there was enough interest among the faculty to vote on unionization. In February 1998, 117 of the 176 voting teachers approved ending the informal teachers; senate and joining the Illinois branch of the National Education Association.

Throughout the 1980s and 1990s, the African-American population of the school increased. In 1992, the Oak Park NAACP called for an independent citizens group to investigate the disproportionate number of suspensions and expulsions given out to African-American students because there were teachers who were not familiar with working with African-American students. The situation escalated in 1993 when two teachers were found to have been involved in an altercation, with the white male receiving a letter of reprimand, and the African-American woman receiving the support of the NAACP and NOW, among others. In May 1994, the school closed a mentoring room set up by an African-American parents' group, and, citing an "internal leadership issue" with the organization, denied further use of school facilities for their meetings. Nonetheless, the group defied the ban, and met at the school in October.

Homecoming 1994 added to the issues the school was facing. Initially, two young ladies were refused the right to purchase tickets to a "couples only" dance; the school quickly changed the policy and permitted single-ticket sales. Despite the quick change, minority parents, and members of the gay and lesbian community formed a new organization to address issues of race and sexual orientation at the school. Specifically, the group demanded an increase in minority hiring (17 of the school's 157 teachers were minorities, compared to almost 36% of the student population) and a revision of the most recent code of conduct. When the school board members were invited to meet with the group (as well as with teachers, students, and two trustees of the town), no members of the board appeared. In 2004, the African-American parents' organization was able to convince state legislators that an investigation of the school's discipline system was necessary, and the Illinois State Board of Education was charged with doing that.

Despite some parents' and students' complaints regarding an infringement of students' privacy in a public place, the school installed security cameras as a part of a technology infrastructure upgrade in the summer of 1996.

A long-standing tradition at the school called for young women to wear long, white gowns and carry a dozen red roses, and for young men to wear a dark sports jacket, white dress shirt and red necktie at graduation exercises. In 1998, one potential valedictorian refused to wear a dress. Even after she was named valedictorian, the school refused to change tradition, forcing her to receive her diploma from the principal's office, and forego giving her address. In 2016, this policy changed such that any student, regardless of gender, could wear "an all-white or all-dark dress, skirt and top, pant suit, or suit." In 2018, the District 200 Board of Education voted to change the commencement attire to all caps and gowns.

In 2003, the WB Network aired the reality series High School Reunion, featuring alumni of OPRF.

During the 2015–2016 school year, documentarian Steve James followed 12 students of OPRF with his film crew to shoot a documentary television series, eventually titled America to Me. In the series, James examines the complex racial disparities and achievement gaps in "a well-funded center of education in an affluent, progressive community". The series began airing on 26 August 2018 on the Starz network.

In 2016–2017, the school noticed issues with its current pools and its south cafeteria. They planned to rebuild the pools and reconstruct the parking garage due to problems with the foundation of the existing pools. Taxpayers refused this plan multiple times over the years to come.

In the summer of 2020 came the demolition of the south cafeteria. The school proposed a $32.6M plan to construct a more structurally sound cafeteria, a new library, and a student resource center, scheduled to be completed by January 2022.

== Notable alumni ==
=== Writing ===
- Richard Bach, writer (Jonathan Livingston Seagull, Illusions: The Adventures of a Reluctant Messiah)
- Ernest Hemingway, author (For Whom the Bell Tolls, The Old Man and the Sea)
- Tavi Gevinson, founder and editor-in-chief of Rookie

=== Media ===
==== Acting and comedy ====
- Dan Castellaneta, actor and voice of cartoon character Homer Simpson.
- Anna Chlumsky, actress (My Girl)
- Johnny Galecki, actor (The Big Bang Theory, Roseanne), attended high school for one day
- Mason Gamble, actor (Dennis the Menace, Rushmore)
- Kathy Griffin, comedian
- Thomas Lennon, actor and screenwriter
- John Mahoney, actor (Frasier)
- Mary Elizabeth Mastrantonio, actress (Scarface, The Color of Money)
- Amy Morton, actress (Chicago PD)
- Lois Nettleton, actress
- Cecily Strong, actress, comedian (Saturday Night Live)
- Judy Tenuta, comedian

=== Politics and law ===
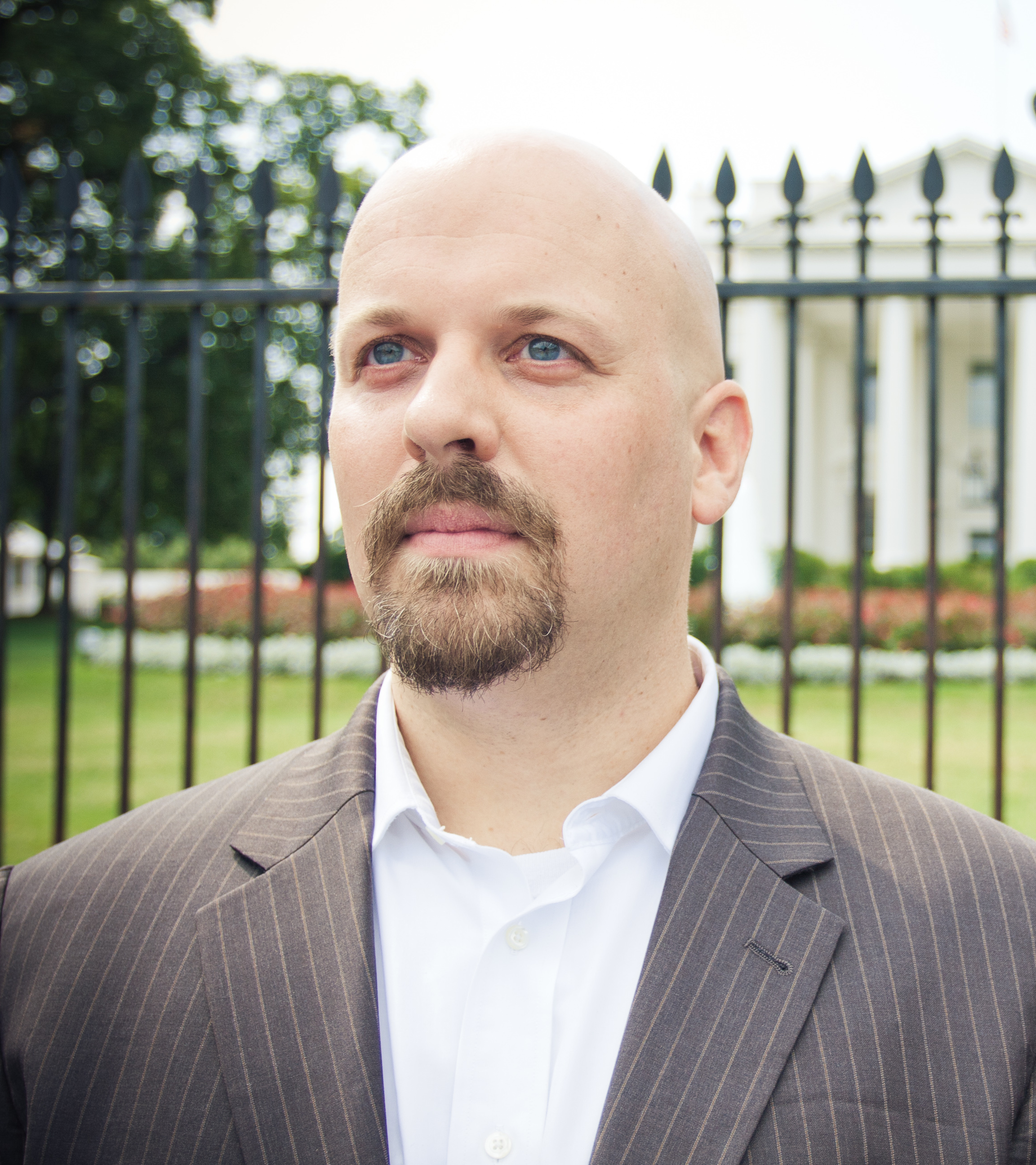
Phil Radford, environmental leader

- Bruce Barton, author and advertising pioneer; US congressman from New York (1937-1940)
- Phil Radford, environmental, clean energy and democracy leader, executive director, Greenpeace, raised in Oak Park

=== Sports ===
==== Basketball ====
- Ashraf Amaya, forward for the Washington Bullets, Vancouver Grizzlies, and several international teams
- Iman Shumpert was drafted by the New York Knicks as the 17th pick in the 2011 NBA Draft.

==== Football ====
- George Trafton, Hall of Fame center for the Chicago Bears
- Bob Zuppke, head football coach, University of Illinois

== See also ==
- Oak Park and River Forest High School#Athletics for the school's athletic history, including its role in state and international athletic history.
