= The Ferret Chronicles =

Series of fantasy novels by Richard Bach

- Rescue Ferrets at Sea (2002); Air Ferrets Aloft (2002); Writer Ferrets: Chasing the Muse (2002); Rancher Ferrets on the Range (2003); The Last War: Detective Ferrets & the Case of the Golden Deed (2003); Curious Lives: Adventures from the Ferret Chronicles (2005)
- Author: Richard Bach
- Illustrator: Richard Bach
- Country: United States
- Language: English
- Genre: Fantasy, young adult fiction
- Publisher: Scribner
- Published: 18 June 2002 – 30 July 2008
- No. of books: 6

The Ferret Chronicles is a series of short novels set in a fantasy world mostly similar to the real world except in which intelligent animals live alongside humans. It primarily focuses on ferret characters with only occasional references to humans or other intelligent animal species. The author and illustrator of the series is Richard Bach, and the five novels were originally published by Scribner Publishing. Condensed versions of the novels have since been republished first by Hampton Roads Publishing Company. and more recently by Jaico Publishing House. The first two novels share the same publication date leading to Amazon and GoodReads disagreeing on the numbering of the novels. The books themselves do not explicitly state a sequence.

There are five main novels in the series. There is also an omnibus that collects condensed versions of them all into one volume. As with the author's widely known Jonathan Livingston Seagull and Illusions, The Ferret Chronicles works to further illustrate his philosophy as well as build off of his background as a pilot.

"ferrets." written in Ferret script.

The first four novels begin with a ferret prophesy written in Ferret script (also called "ferrune") followed by a short ferret fable written twice: first in Ferret script and second in Latin script with the moral emphasized. There is no explanation provided in any of the books for Ferret script, but it is a simple substitution cipher. The novels also have a small number of illustrations scattered throughout them, and some of these also feature bits of writing in Ferret script.

== Setting and universe ==
The setting of The Ferret Chronicles is similar to the real world, except many animals are intelligent and have the power to speak. Many cities including (among others) Anchorage, Hong Kong, London, Paris, Salt Lake City, San Francisco, Seattle, and Tokyo. Humans and animals peacefully live parallel lives side by side, generally sharing spaces but having differently scaled buildings and facilities as appropriate. The books focus on the lives of ferret characters and there are not many direct interactions with humans or other animal species.

Ferret society is similar to real-world human society, with its businesses, governments, regulations, and laws. While there are sometimes overlaps between ferret and human societies in these areas, often they instead have their own ferret variations; for example, the giant international company MusTelCo is led by CEO and founder Stilton Ferret and appears in more than one book. While ferret society is no Utopia, it tends to run more smoothly than human society due to the attitudes and behaviors of the ferrets, and the series explores some of these differences in detail.

A small number of ferrets are shown to have some types of psychic powers. Additionally there are occasional supernatural elements. The two with the largest impact in the series are philosopher ferrets and angel ferret fairies.

Philosopher ferrets are more than just philosophers; they are beings with mystical powers, but rely far more on their wisdom. Exceptional ferrets are sometimes suspected of secretly being philosopher ferrets.

Some ferrets after death can become angel ferret fairies. Angel ferret fairies travel around invisibly trying to guide characters toward good choices. They can psychically influence characters with varying degrees of success and can rarely make themselves seen. It is not clear if angel fairies exist for other species or if they are unique to ferrets.

== Books ==
=== Rescue Ferrets at Sea ===
First released in 2002, this story mostly follows the adventures of Bethany Ferret, captain of a Ferret Rescue Service boat. It is a mix of adventure on the high seas and a reflection of how someone with humble beginnings can achieve her dreams. It establishes that although other types of animals also sail in ships, ferrets are the ones that do most of the rescue work for non-human species. The Ferret Rescue Service is said to operate alongside and in cooperation with human organizations like the Coast Guard.

Ever since she was a tiny kit, Captain Bethany Ferret has always wanted to be in charge of her own rescue boat. Through a mix of determination, luck, hard work, and true friendship she works her way up through the ranks of the Ferret Rescue Service and becomes captain of her own rescue boat Resolute. Gaining a reputation for her skill and bravery, she gets an unusual assignment: take star reporter Chloe Ferret on board as one of her crew. Although initially concerned about having to bring on someone so inexperienced into such potentially dangerous situations, she does so with some trepidation, and the two eventually grow respect one another and become friends.

=== Air Ferrets Aloft ===
First released in 2002, this story follows the adventures of Stormy Ferret and Captain Strobe Ferret, two made-for-each-other pilots who manage to keep not meeting one another until friendly supernatural forces get involved. It combines realistic descriptions of flying with new romance and aeronautical angels. It establishes side-by-side ferret and human facilities in airports (although both ferrets and humans share the same aircraft arrival and departure queues), and angel ferret fairies play a large role.

Captain Janine "Stormy" Ferret flies airplanes with an almost unequaled passion, but if there is any other ferret in the world who can equal her passion, it is Captain Strobe Ferret. Stormy is the cargo pilot and captain of the AirFerrets SkyFreighter. Strobe is the Chief Pilot for the giant conglomerate MusTelCo. Both hang out in the same areas, know many of the same ferrets, and even do some of the same sorts of volunteer work, but have never actually met one another. Angel ferret fairies get involved to try and shift fate (and the weather) to ensure the two meet, but they are not prepared for just how strong headed and stubborn the two can be.

=== Writer Ferrets: Chasing the Muse ===
First released in 2002, this story explores the marriage between two authors: Budgeron Ferret and Danielle Ferret, at a time when their respective careers are placing a strain on it. It looks at the impact of jealousy on a marriage and considers how to work around it.

Budgeron Ferret is a famous author of inspirational books for kits, but he wants to be taken more seriously. He has spent years working on a novel that he hopes will get others to recognize him as being more than just a kits' writer, but it is a struggle. Somewhat on a lark, his wife Danielle Ferret decides to try her hand at writing, and effortlessly creates a scandalous romance about the naughty Veronique Sibhoan Ferret. Initially her story gets rejected as no publisher wants to gamble on such an un-ferretlike tale, and Budgeron, knowing the pains of rejection, provides her with support and encouragement. Once she does find a publisher her novel quickly becomes more successful than anything Budgeron has ever written, and it becomes difficult for him to process his feelings.

=== Rancher Ferrets on the Range ===
First released in 2003, this story follows the linked but separated lives of star actress Cheyenne Jasmine Ferret and successful rancher Montgomery Ferret, each of whom is locked in their own world in spite of their love for each other. It establishes that ferrets raise a special breed of miniature sheep, and a philosopher ferret plays a role.

Montgomery Ferret and Cheyenne Ferret grew up together on the range. Montgomery loved everything about his environment, and excelled at being a rancher, steadily building up more and more success. Cheyenne wanted the lights of the city, moved away and studied acting, and remade herself as Jasmine Ferret, international star of the screen. Each has achieved their dreams, but in first separation and later a chance encounter they realize how much they truly love one another.

=== The Last War: Detective Ferrets & the Case of the Golden Deed ===
First released in 2003, this story looks at Detective Shamrock Ferret and how she uses her gift of psychometry to investigate the origins of ferret society that have since been lost to history, especially the ubiquitous philosophy that serves to guide all ferrets.

Shamrock Ferret had been sensitive to the hidden natures of things even as a kit, and with her father's support develops it into a full psychic recall ability. She uses this to become a one-of-a-kind detective, and in that role gets embroiled in solving the mystery of ferret civilization. Who or what made ferrets the way they are now? Why are the Courtesies so ubiquitous? What were past ferrets like? She gets more than she could ever expect and witnesses the near-end of civilization during her quest.

=== Curious Lives: Adventures from the Ferret Chronicles ===
This is an omnibus that combines condensed versions of the five novels into one volume. It was originally published under this title by Hampton Roads Publishing Company in 2005 but has since been republished under the title Curious Lives: Adventures from an Enchanted World by Jaico Publishing House first in 2007 and in a second printing with different cover art in 2008

== Critical reception ==
Books in The Ferret Chronicles have received mostly positive reviews with comments like "plenty of restrained realism", "Bach is a masterful writer", "fun", "Pale Fire for preteens and teens", and "Be prepared to spend the next few months in reflection of the lives of these lovely ferrets, which will not only influence you but also alter your process of thinking and living."

Hampton Roads Publishing Company indicates on the back of Curious Lives that they chose to republish it in a new form because they themselves were fans of the stories, saying "We're a small publisher. We love this book. Truth must be told."
