= Cultural depictions of weasels =

Weasels are mammals belonging to the family Mustelidae and the genus Mustela, which includes stoats, least weasels, ferrets, and minks, among others. Different species of weasel have lived alongside humans on every continent except Antarctica and Australia, and have been assigned a wide range of folkloric and mythical meanings.

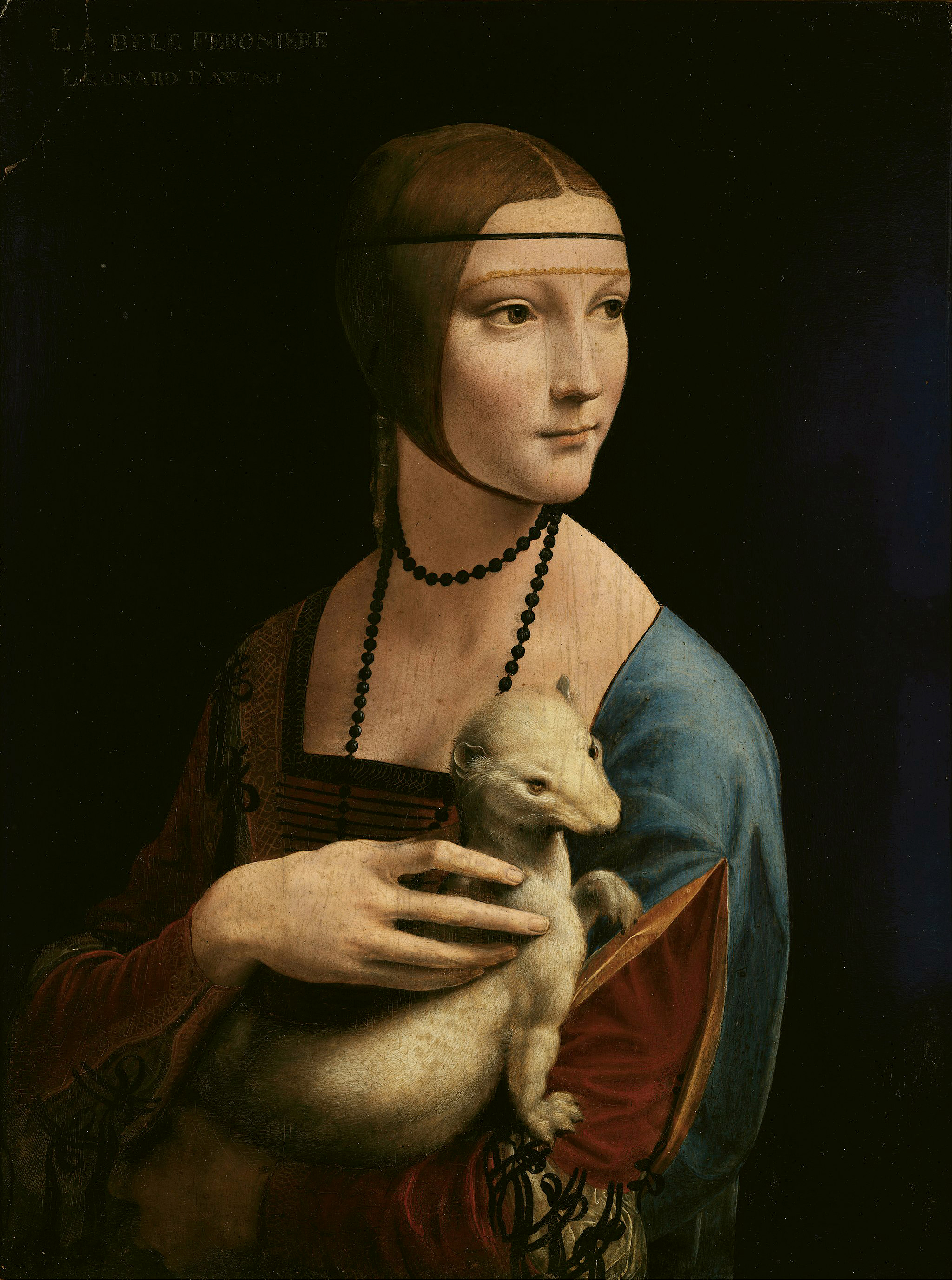
Leonardo da Vinci's Lady with an Ermine (1489–1491)

== Early history ==
=== Çatalhöyük ===
Excavations in Çatalhöyük, the earliest known agricultural settlement in Turkey (dating to 7000-6000 BC), uncovered animal parts which were incorporated into the structure of homes in what may have been a ritual practice. The teeth of weasels, alongside the teeth of foxes, tusks of wild boars, the claws of bears, and vulture beaks, were found embedded in plaster wall decorations.

== In antiquity ==
=== Greece and Rome ===
Weasels were likely seen as pests in Ancient Greece and Rome. There are modern claims that the Ancient Greeks and Romans kept weasels as house pets. Plutarch and Cicero both refer to weasels as household pets in their writing.

They were also thought to have anti-venom properties: Pliny the Elder details a recipe for an antidote for asp venom made from crushed weasels, and writes about a least weasel slaying a basilisk in his Natural History:

To this dreadful monster the effluvium of the weasel is fatal, a thing that has been tried with success, for kings have often desired to see its body when killed; so true is it that it has pleased Nature that there should be nothing without its antidote. The animal is thrown into the hole of the basilisk, which is easily known from the soil around it being infected. The weasel destroys the basilisk by its odour, but dies itself in this struggle of nature against its own self.

== Japan ==
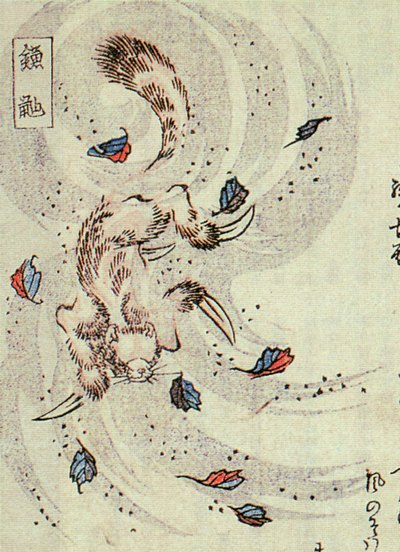
"Kamaitachi" (鎌鼬) from the Kyōka Hyaku Monogatari by Masasumi Ryūkansaijin

The Kamaitachi (鎌鼬) is a Japanese yōkai that is said to take the form of a weasel who either has sharp nails or sickles in place of paws.

In Tōhoku, injuries received from a kamaitachi can be healed by burning an old calendar and putting it on the wound. In Shin'etsu, there is a folk belief that one could encounter a kamaitachi by stepping on a calendar. The wounds received from a kamaitachi do not bleed or cause pain, but are deep.

There are variations on the myth and the appearance of the kamaitachi, but nearly all involve strong winds causing cuts to appear on people. The version in which the yōkai appears as a weasel describes it as having the bristles of a hedgehog, cry of a dog, and sickles for limbs.

== China ==
In China, it is considered bad luck to kill a weasel, as they're said to be wandering spirits (shen) that can steal and replace people's souls; killing them brings bad luck or death on the killer and their family.

== Europe ==
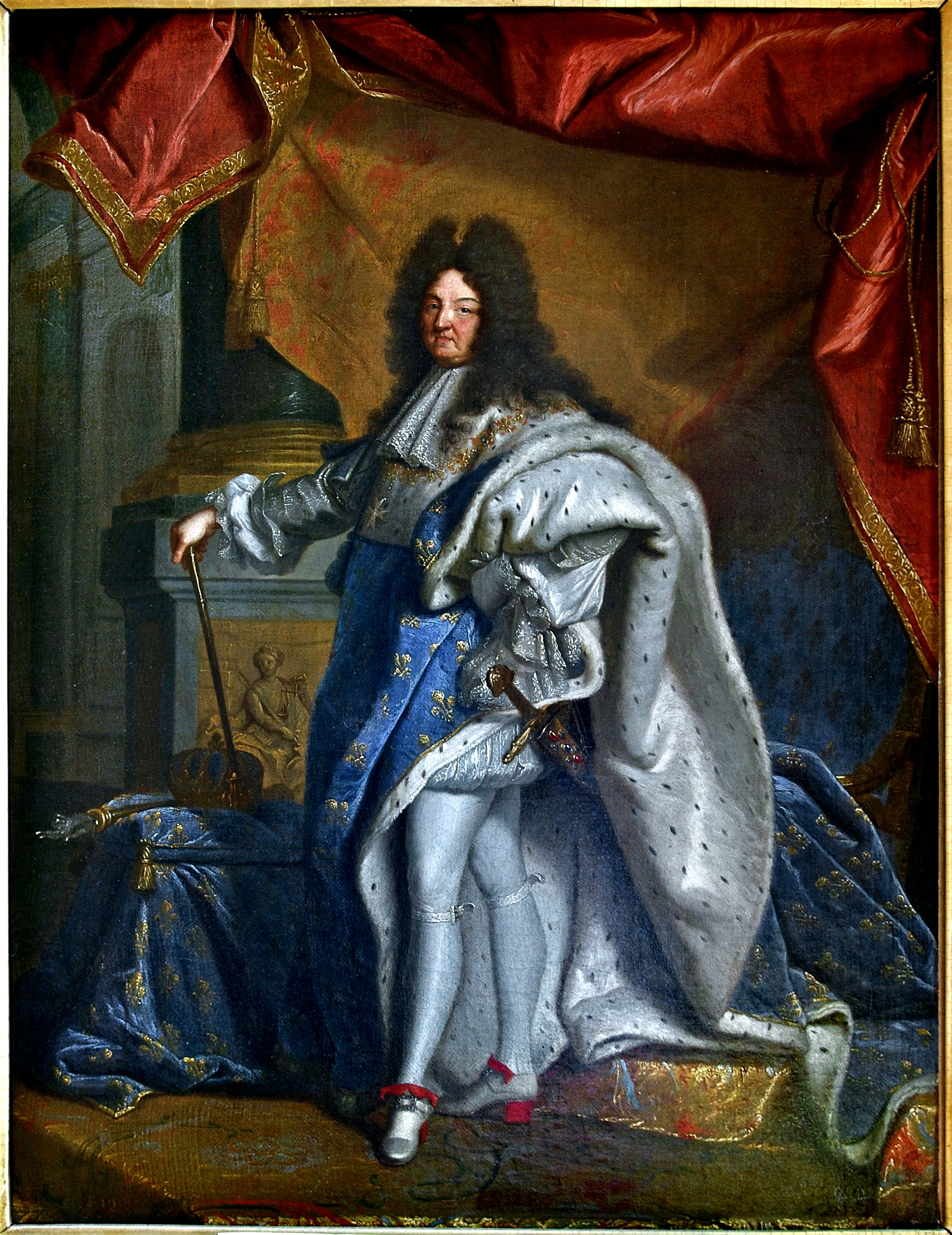
Louis XIV, as painted by Hyacinthe Rigaud, in an ermine-lined cape.

The ermine was seen as a symbol of purity, for the belief that it would rather die than dirty its white fur: if hunters were chasing it, it would supposedly turn around and surrender rather than risk soiling itself. Because of this association, ermine fur had been used in heraldry, as a trim on crowns and coronation cloaks, and on the garments of prelates of the Catholic Church for hundreds of years.

=== Brittany ===
The ermine is the national symbol of Brittany, and the Breton flag has an ermine canton.

=== Greece ===
The weasel is associated with the destruction of clothing, especially that of brides-to-be, in Southern Greece. The Greek word for weasel is νυφίτσα, which translates to "little bride." Legend goes that the weasel was a bride transformed, and, being jealous of soon-to-be human brides, destroys their wedding dresses. A wedding custom dictates:

Therefore, in the house where these (wedding dresses) are collected, sweetmeats and honey are put out to appease her, known as 'the necessary spoonfuls,' and a song is sung with much ceremony in which the weasel is invited to partake and spare the wedding array.

In Macedonia, another folk tale posits that if a woman gets a headache after washing her hair with water drawn overnight, it was because a weasel used the water as a mirror. She should refrain from saying the name of the weasel aloud, or it will cause the household's clothing to decay.

=== Italy ===
An ermine was used as a symbol of moderation by Leonardo da Vinci in his painting Lady with an Ermine. In a bestiary he compiled he wrote:

MODERATION The ermine out of moderation never eats but once a day, and it would rather let itself be captured by hunters than take refuge in a dirty lair, in order not to stain its purity.

Ermines were used to symbolize pregnancy in Renaissance-era Italy.

== England and Ireland ==
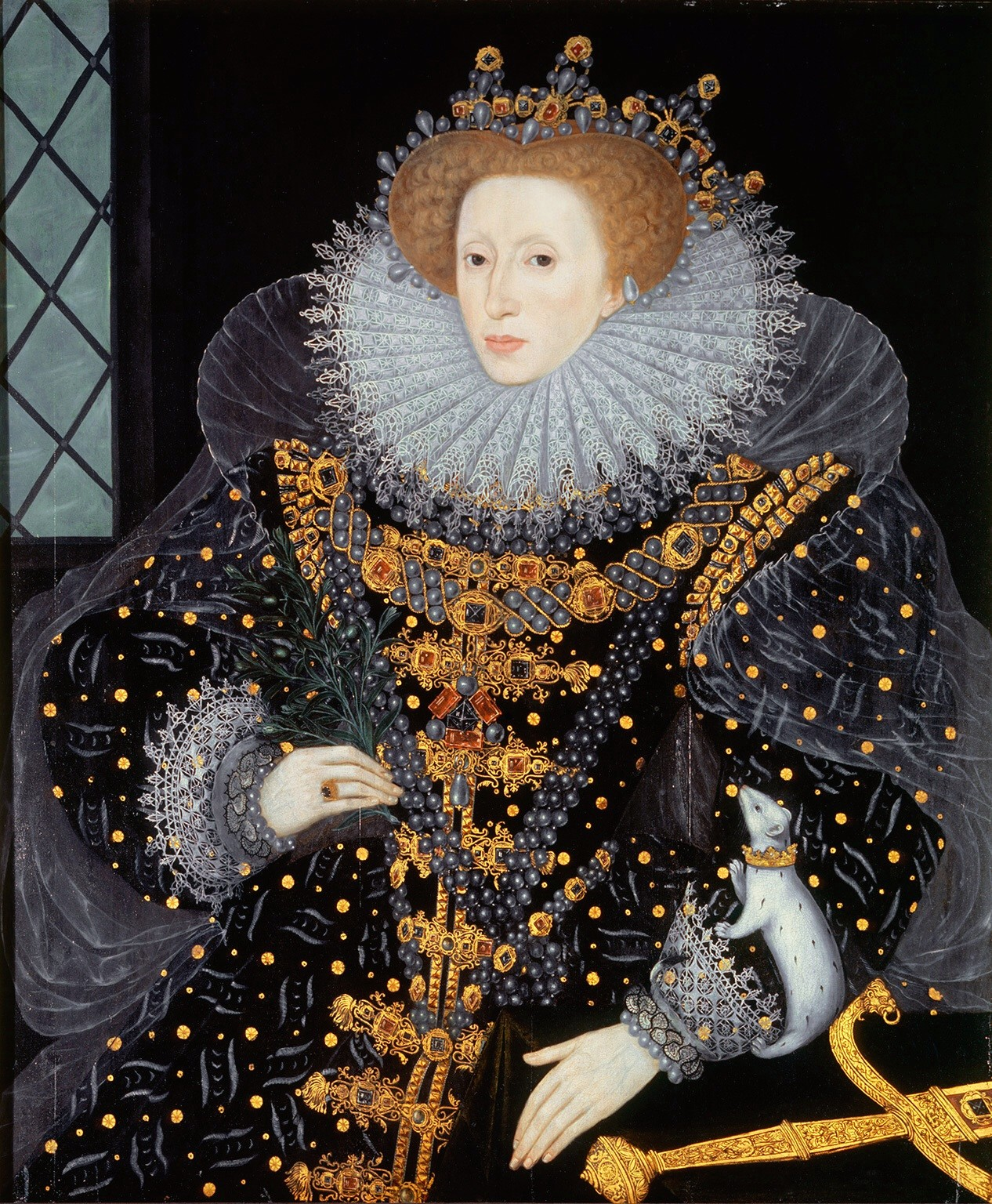
The Ermine Portrait, William Segar, 1585. Elizabeth I shown with an ermine, symbolizing purity.

In Ireland, stoats were thought to behave like humans who had family structures and rituals for the dead. Seeing a stoat at the beginning of a journey was considered bad luck unless you greeted the animal as a neighbor.

In 17th century England, weasels were believed to be the familiars of witches.

== North America ==
The folklore of several tribes mentions weasels. They are variably depicted as heroes or tricksters, depending on the region. The Shoshone and Paiute describe the weasel as a trickster spirit, the Abenaki and Tlingit associated them with sorcery, while the Anishinaabe associated them with healing and used their pelts for medicine bags.

A Chippewa myth details how a least weasel killed a wendigo giant by climbing up its anus and sickening it.

Inuit mythology describes weasels as wise and brave. One story describes a hero who would choose to transform into a least weasel when he had to accomplish a task demanding bravery.

== In popular culture ==
Weasels, ferrets, and stoats appear in Kenneth Grahame's The Wind in the Willows as the antagonists for the book's third act after they invade and take over Toad Hall. In the rest of the book, they are depicted as bandits and ruffians living in the Wild Wood.

In Brian Jacques' Redwall series of books, weasels are depicted as villainous (and deceitful in particular), living in and leading groups of other carnivorous mammals, such as ferrets, rats, and foxes.

Richard Bach's The Ferret Chronicles series of books portray ferrets in the opposite way: they are seen as virtuous and heroic, with their life lessons and discussions on philosophy presented as something humans could learn from, too.

In 1851, in chapter 133 of the first American edition of Herman Melville's eponymously titled novel Moby-Dick, the white-speckled whale dives deep. Shortly after, Melville describes Ahab's first glimpse of the whale rising at great speed from the depths as "a white living spot no bigger than a white weasel,..." It's unclear why, at this momentous point in the novel, Melville chose to describe the appearance of Moby-Dick as a weasel. Melville was a minutely careful, intensely allusive writer, and his reference here is obscure.

In 2015, a photograph of a least weasel 'riding' on a woodpecker's back went viral. As explained by wildlife experts, the weasel was attacking the woodpecker as prey.

I. M. Weasel, a smart, successful weasel, was the title character of I Am Weasel, a series of 7-minute animated shorts for Cartoon Network that ran from 1997 to 2000. He was voiced by Michael Dorn.

In 2006, musical comedian Weird Al Yankovic wrote a satirical song, "Weasel Stomping Day". It depicts a bizarre holiday in which people apparently wear Viking helmets, spread mayonnaise on their lawns, and literally go out "stomping" weasels. Although the origins are a bit murky ("Why we do it, who can say; but it's such a festive holiday!"), its activities are just as vaguely justified: "So let the stomping fun begin, bash their weaselly skulls right in! It's tradition, that makes it okay!"

In 2023 Dropout's Dimension 20 aired its 20th season Burrows End. An actual play show, the plot revolved a family of Stoats who have gained human level sapience in the fallout of a nuclear reactor meltdown.
