= Eleanor Friede =

Eleanor Kask
- Born: Eleanor Claire Kask; November 12, 1920; Rochester, New York, U.S.
- Died: July 14, 2008 (aged 87); Charlottesville, Virginia, U.S.
- Education: Hofstra University
- Occupations: Book editor, literary agent
- Spouse: Donald Friede (to 1993)

Eleanor Friede (born Eleanor Claire Kask; November 12, 1921 – July 14, 2008) was an American book editor and literary agent, best known for bringing the 1970 novella Jonathan Livingston Seagull to publication.

== Early life and career ==
Born Eleanor Claire Kask on November 12, 1921, in Rochester, New York, Friede was the first born child of Claire (née Kassick) and John Kask. Raised in Valley Stream, she graduated with honors from Hofstra University and shortly thereafter went to work for World Publishing in publicity and marketing.

Friede was working as a marketing director at Macmillan in 1968 when company president Jeremiah Kaplan convinced her to become an editor. A year later she persuaded Macmillan to buy Jonathan Livingston Seagull, a fable about a seagull who breaks from his flock in search of freedom. The novella by Richard Bach sold more than three million copies in hardcover.

In 1974, Friede received her own imprint at Delacorte Press. Following Delacorte's purchase by Doubleday in the early 1980s she launched Eleanor Friede Books, a literary agency. One of the books published under the Delacorte Press was Somewhere a Cat is Waiting, a 1976 collection of three of the author Derek Tangye's books, whose works were affectionately referred to as The Minack Chronicles.

== Personal life and death ==
She married Donald Friede, a World Publishing editor, in 1951. He died in 1965.

Friede died in Charlottesville, Virginia, on July 14, 2008, at the age of 87.
