= Leslie Parrish =

American actress (1935–2025)

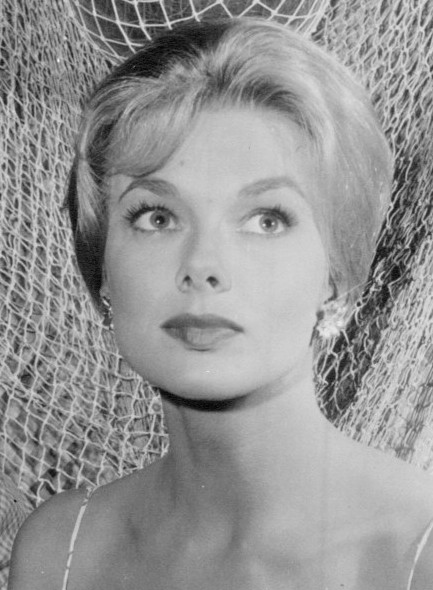
- Parrish in Follow the Sun, 1962
- Born: Marjorie Hellen; March 18, 1935; Melrose, Massachusetts, U.S.
- Died: November 14, 2025 (aged 90); San Juan Island, Washington, U.S.
- Occupations: Actress; activist; writer; producer
- Years active: 1955–1978
- Known for: The Manchurian Candidate; The Giant Spider Invasion; Batman; Star Trek: "Who Mourns for Adonais?"
- Spouses: Ric Marlow (m. 1955; div. 1961) Richard Bach (m. 1981; div. 1999)

Leslie Maria Parrish (born Marjorie Hellen; March 18, 1935 – November 14, 2025) was an American actress, activist, environmentalist, writer and producer. She worked under her birth name for six years before changing it in 1959.

== Early life ==
Marjorie Hellen was born in Melrose, Massachusetts on March 18, 1935.

As a child, Parrish lived in Massachusetts, Pennsylvania, New York and New Jersey. At the age of 10, her family finally settled in Upper Black Eddy, Pennsylvania. At the age of 14, Parrish was a talented and promising piano and composition student at the Philadelphia Conservatory of Music. At the age of 16, Parrish earned money for her tuition by working as a maid and a waitress, and by teaching piano. At the age of 18, to earn enough money to continue her education at the Conservatory, her mother persuaded her to become a model for one year.

== Modeling and acting ==
In April 1954, as a 19-year-old model with the Conover Agency in New York City, Parrish was under contract to NBC-TV as "Miss Color TV" (she was used during broadcasts as a human test pattern to check accuracy of skin tones). She was quickly discovered and signed with Twentieth Century Fox in Hollywood. In 1956, she was put under contract to Metro-Goldwyn-Mayer. Because acting allowed her to help her family financially, she remained in Hollywood and gave up her career in music.

== Films and television ==
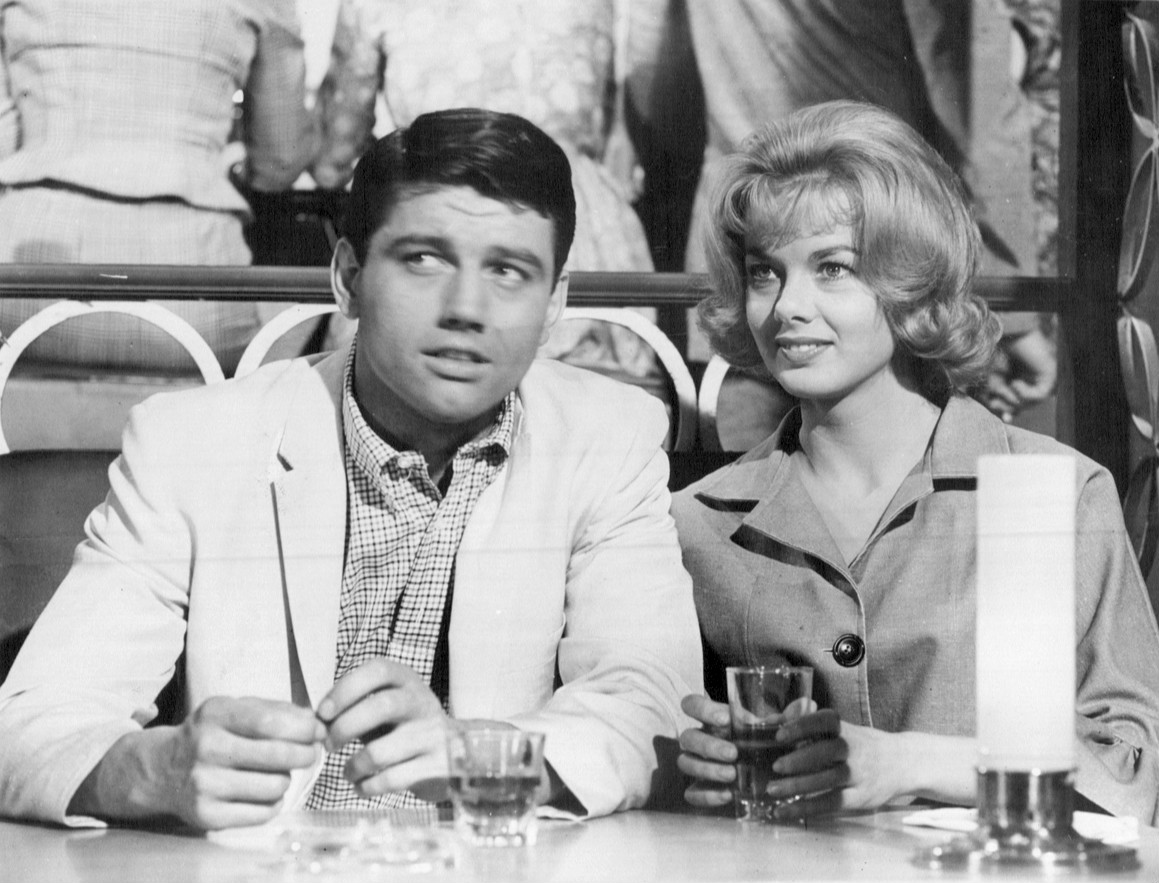
With Ralph Taeger in Acapulco (1961)

Parrish co-starred/guest-starred in numerous films and television shows throughout the 1960s and 1970s. She gained wide attention in her first starring role as Daisy Mae in the movie version of Li'l Abner (1959), where she changed her name from Marjorie Hellen to Leslie Parrish at the director's request. She appeared in the film The Manchurian Candidate (1962), playing Laurence Harvey's on-screen fiancée, Jocelyn Jordan. Other film credits include starring opposite Kirk Douglas in For Love or Money (1963) and Jerry Lewis in Three on a Couch (1966), among others.

She amassed an extensive résumé of television credits. Among many other credits, Parrish appeared in guest starring roles on episodes of The Wild Wild West, My Three Sons, Perry Mason, Family Affair, Bat Masterson, The Man From U.N.C.L.E., Adam-12, Good Morning World, Police Story, Batman and McCloud. In 1967, she guest-starred on the Star Trek episode "Who Mourns for Adonais?", portraying Lt. Carolyn Palamas, the love interest of the character Apollo. In February 1968, she played opposite Peter Breck in the episode "A Bounty on a Barkley" of The Big Valley. The following month, Parrish made her first guest appearance on Mannix in the episode "The Girl in the Frame".

Parrish served as associate producer on the film version of Jonathan Livingston Seagull (1973). Among other things, she hired the director of photography Jack Couffer – who later received an Academy Award nomination for his efforts – and she was responsible for the care of the film's real-life seagulls, which she kept inside a room at a Holiday Inn in Carmel-by-the-Sea, California for the duration of the shoot. When the relationship between author Richard Bach and director Hall Bartlett disintegrated and a lawsuit followed, Parrish was appointed as the mediator between the two men, but the mediation failed. Ultimately, the film was released in theaters with Bach's name taken off the screenwriting credits, while Bartlett demoted Parrish's credit in the finished film from associate producer to researcher.

In 1975, Parrish appeared in the low budget B-Movie The Giant Spider Invasion which is now regarded as a cult film.

While acting provided financial stability, her main interest was in social causes including the anti-war and civil rights movements and, as far back as the mid 1950s, the environment.

== Political activism ==
Parrish's interests and activities in social movements and politics grew to become her main work. She was a vocal opponent of the Vietnam War, and a member of the Jeannette Rankin Brigade, a group of notable women who fought against the war and for civil rights. Parrish founded "STOP" (Speakers and Talent Organized for Peace), an anti-war organization that trained speakers to engage the public.

== Los Angeles municipal government ==
In 1969, Parrish joined many in an effort to remove Los Angeles mayor Sam Yorty from office. She supported and campaigned for a former police lieutenant named Tom Bradley, who was then the city's first black city councilman. Despite high polling numbers prior to the election, Bradley lost to Yorty, giving rise to what was later known as "The Bradley Effect." Next day, he decided to run again, and over the next four years Parrish worked with him closely to help secure his victory in the next mayoral election. In 1973, Bradley became Los Angeles's first black mayor. Parrish was one of forty activist citizens who served on Bradley's Blue Ribbon Commission to choose new Los Angeles Commissioners. Parrish and Tom Bradley remained friends for many years.

== Creator of innovative television ==
The lack of media coverage during the Century City riots in 1967 prompted Parrish to think of a new way to cover such events live to prevent suppression and/or manipulation of the news. In 1969, she began to create a television station that would devote itself to covering public events and provide in-depth analysis and discussions of important developments in the world. In 1974, KVST-TV (Viewer Sponsored Television, Channel 68, Los Angeles) went on the air as part of the PBS system of stations. Film notables, business people and local activists formed the board of directors and provided support for the unique station. After a difficult start, KVST was receiving positive reviews in Los Angeles and nationwide attention. However, by 1976, internal dissension on the board of directors led to the demise of the station; the signal was turned off and the license turned in.

== Environmental activism ==
While living in Oregon, Parrish saw devastated forests managed by the Bureau of Land Management (BLM) and decided to protest a local timber sale. With two neighbors, she and Bach established an organization called "Threatened and Endangered: Little Applegate Valley" (TELAV). They worked for two years researching and writing a 600-page legal and scientific protest of BLM's logging of forests which would not regenerate, which was illegal. The BLM assistant state director eventually agreed, telling the Medford Mail Tribune that ..."The sale involves enough improprieties in BLM rules and procedures that it can’t be legally awarded. In order to comply with our own procedures we had no choice but to withdraw the sale and reject all bids." The TELAV protest document served as the basis for many future timber sale protests in the U.S. and Canada. TELAV continues to fight for the environment to this day and the Little Applegate Valley has never been logged.

In 1999, Parrish created a 240-acre (97 ha) wildlife sanctuary on Orcas Island (in the San Juan Islands, Washington State) to save it from normal development techniques which include logging. She named it the "Spring Hill Wildlife Sanctuary".

== Personal life and death ==
Parrish married songwriter Ric Marlow in 1955; the couple divorced in 1961. In 1981, she married Richard Bach, the author of the 1970 book Jonathan Livingston Seagull, whom she met during the making of the 1973 movie of the same name. She was a major element in two of his subsequent books—The Bridge Across Forever (1984) and One (1988)—which primarily focused on their relationship and Bach's concept of soulmates. They divorced in 1999.

Parrish died on San Juan Island, Washington, on November 14, 2025, at the age of 90. Her death was not publicly announced until August 23, 2026.

== Film credits ==
Year	Title	Role
1955	A Man Called Peter	Newlywed †
1955	Daddy Long Legs	College Girl †
1955	The Virgin Queen	Anne*
1955	How to Be Very, Very Popular	Girl On Bus†
1955	The Girl in the Red Velvet Swing	Florodora Girl †
1956	The Lieutenant Wore Skirts	Tipsy Girl At Party †
1956	The Power and the Prize	Telephone Operator †
1957	Hot Summer Night	Hazel †
1957	Man on Fire	Honey †
1958	Missile to the Moon	Zema*
1958	Tank Battalion	Lt. Alice Brent*
1959	Li'l Abner	Daisy Mae Scragg
1961	Portrait of a Mobster	Iris Murphy
1962	The Manchurian Candidate	Jocelyn Jordan
1963	For Love or Money	Jan Brasher
1964	Sex and the Single Girl	Susan
1966	Three on a Couch	Mary Lou Mauve
1968	The Money Jungle	Treva Saint
1969	The Candy Man	Julie Evans
1969	The Devil's 8	Cissy
1970	Brother, Cry for Me (aka: Boca Affair)	Jenny Noble
1971	D.A.: Conspiracy to Kill	Ramona Bertrand
1971	Banyon	Ruth Sprague
1975	The Giant Spider Invasion	Ev
1976	The Astral Factor (aka: Invisible Strangler)	Colleen Hudson
1977	Crash	Kathy Logan

- * credited as Marjorie Hellen
- † uncredited bit role

== Television credits ==
=== General television credits ===
Airdate	Series title	Episode title	Role
January 3, 1959	Steve Canyon	"Operation Big Thunder"	Jo *
February 29, 1959	77 Sunset Strip	"Lovely Alibi"	Jodie †
1959	Bold Venture	"The Red and The Black"	Helen Day *
May 21, 1959	The Rough Riders	"Deadfall"	Cleopatra *
April 12, 1960	Tightrope	"Gangsters Daughter"	Theresa
April 30, 1960	Perry Mason	"The Case of the Madcap Modiste"	Hope Sutherland
June 2, 1960	Bat Masterson	"The Elusive Baguette"	Lucy Carter
September 21, 1960	The Aquanauts	"Collision"	Jill Talley
October 22, 1960	The Roaring 20s	"Champagne Lady"	Bubbles LaPeer
December 15, 1960	Bat Masterson	"A Time to Die"	Lisa Anders
December 21, 1960	Hawaiian Eye	"Services Rendered"	Marcella
December 23, 1960	Michael Shayne	"Death Selects the Winner"	Ellen Cook
January 27, 1961	77 Sunset Strip	"The Positive Negative"	Amanda Sant
April 3, 1961	Acapulco	"Fisher's Daughter"	unknown
April 17, 1961	Surfside 6	"Circumstantial Evidence"	Sunny Golden
April 18, 1961	The Jim Backus Show (aka: Hot off the Wire)	"The Plant"	unknown
June 28, 1961	Bringing Up Buddy	"The Couple Next Door"	unknown
September 16, 1961	Perry Mason	"The Case of the Impatient Partner"	Vivien Ames
October 22, 1961	Follow the Sun	"Busmans Holiday"	Tiffany Caldwell
November 6, 1961	Surfside 6	"The Affairs at Hotel Delight"	Lavender
November 25, 1961	Perry Mason	"The Case of the Left-Handed Liar"	Veronica Temple
January 9, 1962	Bachelor Father	"Kelly and the Yes Man"	Kim Fontaine
February 14, 1962	Hawaiian Eye	"Four-Cornered Triangle"	Kathy Marsh
February 27, 1962	Ichabod and Me	"Bob's Housekeeper"	Lily Fontain
February 21, 1963	Alcoa Premiere	"Chain Reaction"	Vicki
December 4, 1963	Channing	"A Dolls House with Pom Pom and Trophies"	Joyce Ruskin
March 28, 1964	The Lieutenant	"Operation Actress"	Toni Kaine
November 12, 1964	Kraft Suspense Theatre	"The Kamchatka Incident"	Susan King
November 21, 1964	Kentucky Jones	"The Sour Note"	Miss Patterson
November 27, 1964	The Reporter	"Murder by Scandal"	Ruth Killiam
October 1, 1965	The Wild Wild West	"The Night the Wizard Shook the Earth"	Greta Lundquist
December 4, 1965	Insight	"Fire Within"	Joanne
January 20, 1966	Batman	"The Penguin's a Jinx"	Dawn Robbins
September 15, 1966	My Three Sons	"Stag at Bay"	Flame LaRose
1966 (Fall)	Green for Danger	pilot episode	unknown
October 21, 1966	The Wild Wild West	"The Night of the Flying Pie Plate"	Morn/Maggie
February 17, 1967	Tarzan	"Mask of Rona"	Beryl
March 29, 1967	Batman	"Ice Spy"	Glacia Glaze
March 30, 1967	Batman	"The Duo Defy"	Glacia Glaze
September 22, 1967	Star Trek	"Who Mourns for Adonais?"	Lt. Carolyn Palamas
October 3, 1967	Good Morning World	"World, Buy Calimari" (pilot episode)	Audrey Zeiner
October 16, 1967	The Man From U.N.C.L.E.	"The Masters Touch Affair"	Leslie Welling
January 6, 1968	Iron Horse	"Dry Run to Glory"	Eve Lewis
February 26, 1968	The Big Valley	"A Bounty on a Barkley"	Layle Johnson
March 16, 1968	Mannix	"The Girl in the Frame"	Linda Marley
January 5, 1969	My Friend Tony	Voices	Lila
March 17, 1969	Family Affair	"Speak for Yourself, Mr. French"	Emily Travers
October 18, 1969	Mannix	"The Playground"	Mona
November 8, 1969	Petticoat Junction	"The Tenant"	Jacquelin Moran
November 16, 1969	To Rome with Love	"A Palazzo Is Not a Home"	Elaine
December 8, 1969	Love, American Style	"Love and the Mountain Cabin"	Mrs. Pfister
October 31, 1970	Mannix	"The Other Game in Town"	T.C.
February 5, 1971	Love, American Style	"Love and the Pulitzer Prize"	Michelle Turner
February 28, 1971	Hogan's Heroes	"Kommandant Gertrude"	Karen
November 4, 1971	Bearcats!	"Blood Knot"	Liz Blake
December 14, 1971	Marcus Welby M.D.	"Cross Match"	Elaine Perino
January 31, 1972	Cade's County	"Slay Ride" - Part 1	Jana Gantry
February 6, 1972	Cade's County	"Slay Ride" - Part 2	Jana Gantry
March 10, 1972	O'Hara, U.S. Treasury	"Operation: Smokescreen"	Olga Miles
December 20, 1972	Adam 12	"Gifts and Long Letters"	Sharon Blake
January 8, 1974	The Magician	"Shattered Image"	Lydia
February 12, 1974	Police Story	"The Ripper"	Mrs. Delaley
October 13, 1974	McCloud	"The Gang That Stole Manhattan"	Lynne OConnell
September 13, 1977	Logan's Run	"The Collectors"	Joanna
April 30, 1978	Police Story	"No Margin for Error"	Georgie Hayes

- * credited as Marjorie Hellen
- † uncredited bit role

=== Variety show credits (live TV) ===
Airdate	Series title	Episode title	Role
January 12, 1960	The Red Skelton Show	"Clem Kadiddlehopper in Dog Patch"	Daisy June
April 4, 1961	The Red Skelton Show	"Clem's Theatre"	Daisy June
January 23, 1962	The Red Skelton Show	"Clem and the Kadiddlehopper Hop"	Daisy June

=== Talk shows ===
Airdate	Series title	Notes
November 19, 1962	Here's Hollywood	Jack Linkletter (Interviewer) – S.2, Ep.52
May 24, 1966	The Tonight Show	Jerry Lewis (guest-host)

=== Game shows ===
Series title	Notes
The Dating Game	several broadcast in the early 1960s
Stump the Stars	several broadcast in the 1960s

== Sources ==
- The International Leslie Parrish Website - The Official Site / Full Biography page
- Cushman, Marc (2014). These are the Voyages - Star Trek TOS, Season Two. Jacob Brown Media Group. ISBN 978-1199573766.
- Duncan, David Douglas (1969). Self-Portrait: U.S.A.. Harry N. Abrams. ISBN 978-0989238151.
- Armstrong, David (1981). A Trumpet to Arms: Alternative Media in America. South End Press. ISBN 978-0896081932.
- Wagner, Eleanor Klein (1977). Independent Political Coalitions, Electoral, Legislative and Community: Oral History Transcript. Forgotten Books. ISBN 978-1176537408.
- Bach, Richard (1984). The Bridge Across Forever. Pan Publishing. ISBN 9780440108269.
- Green, Paul (2007). Pete Duel: A Biography. McFarland. ISBN 978-0786430628.
- Who's Who in America 1978-1979 - Volume 2 (40th ed.). Marquis Who's Who. 1978. p. 2504. ISBN 9780837901404.
