= Ace Eli and Rodger of the Skies =

1973 film by John Erman

- Theatrical release poster
- Directed by: John Erman
- Screenplay by: Claudia Salter
- Story by: Steven Spielberg
- Produced by: Robert Fryer; James Cresson
- Starring: Cliff Robertson; Eric Shea; Pamela Franklin
- Cinematography: David M. Walsh
- Edited by: Robert Belcher; Louis Lombardo
- Music by: Jerry Goldsmith
- Distributed by: 20th Century Fox
- Release date: April 1, 1973
- Running time: 92 minutes
- Country: United States
- Language: English
- Budget: $3.3 million

Ace Eli and Rodger of the Skies is a 1973 American adventure comedy film directed by John Erman from a screenplay by Claudia Salter. The film centers on a barnstorming pilot (Cliff Robertson) and his son (Eric Shea) as they fly around the United States in the 1920s, having adventures along the way. One of the driving forces behind the production, Robertson was a real life pilot, although Hollywood stunt pilot Frank Tallman flew most of the aerial scenes. The film was the first feature credit for filmmaker Steven Spielberg, who wrote the story.

Ace Eli and Rodger of the Skies was released in the United States on April 1, 1973, by 20th Century Fox.

== Plot ==
In the early 1920s, Eli is a barnstorming stunt pilot in Kansas. When flying with his wife Wilma, Eli crashes into a barn. He survives by being thrown into a haystack, but his wife is killed. He has to raise his 11-year-old son Rodger on his own. While Eli is the parent, his young son is often the more mature. Both father and son take on the restoration of the wrecked Standard J-1 aircraft, but are at odds when Rodger paints the name "Wilma" on the side of the aircraft. Eli becomes angry and upset and slaps paint over the name, still blaming himself for his wife's death. He paints on a slogan, "Fly with Ace Eli", instead. (Note: "Fly with Ace Eli" appears on the port fuselage, with the word "Ace" scrawled sideways next to the more professional-looking script, while "Fly with Eli" is on the starboard side.)

Wanting to cut all ties to the past, Rodger, who misses his deceased mother, douses their farm house with gasoline and sets it ablaze, taking all the old memories with it. After finishing repairs on their aircraft, Eli and Rodger set off on a barnstorming tour. To begin their odyssey, the pair land on the main street in a small town and are treated like celebrities.

Wherever Eli lands, he finds a new girlfriend, but does not form any permanent relationships. One girl in particular, Shelby, a rich flapper, chases Eli from town to town in her car. Eventually, she joins Eli and Rodger on their trip across the country. With Rodger exploring new adventures, trying out cigarettes and alcohol, and even what Eli calls "smutty" books, he still pines for his mother. Besides learning to fly with his father as a co-pilot, Rodger becomes the manager of the tour, looking after all the finances, even paying Allison, a prostitute. Spurred by a taunt from his father, Rodger flies their aircraft solo, even managing a bouncy landing.

Shelby and Eli carry on a tempestuous relationship, but when Shelby is confronted by Eli's strident professions of love, she brutally ends the affair. Trying to comfort Rodger, for whom she truly cares, she is shunned and leaves. Eli ultimately accepts that his running away and dragging his son along on an aimless journey through Kansas is not good for either himself or his young son. Abandoning the barnstorming tour, the pair of aviators make their way back to their former home, where people still love them.

== Cast ==
- Cliff Robertson as Ace Eli Walford
- Pamela Franklin as Shelby
- Eric Shea as Rodger Walford
- Bernadette Peters as Allison (Note: Bernadette Peters made her film debut in Ace Eli and Rodger of the Skies.)
- Rosemary Murphy as Hannah
- Alice Ghostley as Sister Lite
- Royal Dano as Jake
- Kelly Jean Peters as Rachel
- Don Keefer as Mr. Parsons
- Patricia Smith as Mrs. Wilma Walford
- Herb Gatlin as Frank Savage
- Arthur Malet as Brother Watson
- Ariana Chase as Betty Jo (credited as Ariane Munker)
- Hope Summers as Laura
- Jim Boles as Abraham
- Lew Brown as Harris
- Robert Hamm as Dumb Dickie
- Brent Hurst as Jeffrey
- Rodger Peck as Leroy
- Jan Simms as Mrs. Parsons
- Dixie Lee as Mrs. Harrison
- Claudia Bryar as Ann
- Felicity Van Runkle as Linette
- Pat O'Connor as Brother Foster
- Bill Quinn as Mortician

== Production ==
Steven Spielberg had developed the story of a flyer with a young son, containing themes that interested him: aircraft and flying and parental responsibility. He developed the premise with fellow Cal State alumni Claudia Salter, and hoped to direct it himself, but Richard D. Zanuck, who was then the president of 20th Century Fox, declined to hire Spielberg as director. Producers Robert Fryer and James Cresson hired John Erman to direct because he was older. The film originally ended with Eli committing suicide, but the studio recut it to give it a happier ending. Spielberg was so displeased by the film that he publicly complained it had been "turned into a really sick film. They should bury it." Spielberg would not make a film for Twentieth Century Fox until 2002's Minority Report (even then, this was a co-production with DreamWorks).

Fryer, Cresson, Erman and Salter disapproved of the final edit of the film, which was extensively re-cut, and had their names removed. The film was released with pseudonyms several years after it was filmed. "The names included in the credit box above for those contributions appear on the screen and are fictitious. For the record, 'Ace Eli' was actually produced by Robert Fryer and James Cresson, written by Claudia Ann Salter and directed by John Erman."

The scenes set in the town of "Monument" were actually filmed at Mount Hope, Kansas in 1971. Additional scenes were shot in Hutchinson and Haven, Kansas. In an article in The Hutchinson News about Pamela Franklin, she talked about her experiences of filming in a small Kansas town.

The song "Who's for Complainin?", written and performed by Jim Grady, is featured in the title and end credits.

Props from Ace Eli and Rodger of the Skies were used in the TV series M*A*S*H, also produced by 20th Century Fox. The first season episode "The Army-Navy Game" (originally broadcast in February 1973) ends with a bomb exploding and firing hundreds of propaganda leaflets into the air. The leaflets are actually "Ace Eli" flyers (identifiable in the high-definition version of the episode).

== Reception ==
In his review for The New York Times, Vincent Canby wrote: "The production appears to have been expensive. The aerial photography is lovely, and the performances are O.K., but the movie is such a mess of unexplored moods and loose ends that it makes the later, similar Paper Moon look like a masterpiece. The film, which was made three years ago, is being shown here in a version that the original producers, writer and director so disapprove of that they took their names off it."

Michael McKegney of The Village Voice echoed the sentiments of many critics: "Ace Eli manages to be mildly enjoyable whenever Cliff Robertson, Eric Shea, Pamela Franklin and Rosemary Murphy get the chance to establish some emotional rapport. However, the picaresque plot works against character development, and the visual fragmentation (there seems to be a good deal of post-production butchery) frequently leaves the poor actors struggling to find an expression appropriate to the moment."

In a recent reappraisal on the website WhyFly Aero, Glenn Norman considered the film from the standpoint of historical accuracy: "to my mind – Ace Eli & Rodger of the Skies is one of the most honest portrayals of the real reason most 1920s Barnstormers were out there. Not for the love of flying (like Bach’s Barnstormers in Nothing by Chance {shot the same year!}), but – in the words of Cliff Robertson’s Ace Eli, '...because the whole damn thing is about me.' As far as I’m concerned, this is a very interesting, non-standard take on the whole Barnstormer legend, with great flying sequences that more than make up for any 'unexplored moods and loose ends'."

== See also ==
- The Spirit of St. Louis (film) (1957)
- The Great Waldo Pepper (1975)
- Nothing by Chance (1975)
