= Hall Bartlett =

American film director (1922–1993)

- Born: November 27, 1922; Kansas City, Missouri, U.S.
- Died: September 8, 1993 (aged 70); Los Angeles, California, U.S.
- Occupations: Actor, film director, film producer, screenwriter
- Years active: 1952–1993
- Spouses: Rhonda Fleming (m. 1966; div. 1972) Lupita Ferrer (m. 1978; div. 1982)

Hall Bartlett (November 27, 1922 – September 8, 1993) was an American film producer, director, and screenwriter, and a pioneer of independent filmmaking.

== Early life ==
Hall Bartlett was born in Kansas City, Missouri, he graduated from Yale University, where he was a Phi Beta Kappa member and a Rhodes Scholar nominee. He served five years in U.S. Naval Intelligence during World War II, then started his film making career when he began producing the documentary film Navajo, the first contemporary picture to focus attention on the plight of the American Indian. Bartlett was also the first filmmaker to do a picture about professional football: the film Crazylegs (1953), which Bartlett wrote and produced, was the story of superstar Elroy Hirsch.

== Career ==
=== 1950s ===
Bartlett's next film and directorial debut, Unchained (1955), was distributed by Warner Bros, and once again starred Elroy "Crazylegs" Hirsch. It was filmed inside the California Institution for Men at Chino, California. Bartlett spent six months living as an inmate while he wrote the screenplay. The film's musical theme, "Unchained Melody," became an international classic.

Bartlett then acquired the rights to Arthur Hailey's television play Flight into Danger and adapted it into the film Zero Hour! (1957). The film's plot was later used for Airplane!, the 1980 spoof of disaster films. Bartlett cast Dana Andrews in the lead role, and Hirsch as the pilot.

Drango (1957), a study of the post American Civil War era, was based on the true story about a Union officer who returned to the land his fellow soldiers had ravaged to try to rebuild the South, as Abraham Lincoln had encouraged before his assassination. It starred Jeff Chandler, Joanne Dru, and Julie London.

=== 1960s ===
All the Young Men (1960), starring Sidney Poitier and Alan Ladd, was about a black man's struggle to achieve first class citizenship. New York Times critic Bosley Crowther wrote of the film, "Racial integration in the United States Marines is sluggishly celebrated in a variation on a well-used Western plot."

The Caretakers (1963) centered on the problems of mental health and was (at the request of President John F. Kennedy) the first film ever shown on the floor of the United States Senate. The film starred Robert Stack, Polly Bergen, and Joan Crawford. Leonard Maltin would later describe the film as an "at times incisive view of a West Coast mental hospital, marred by flimsy script and poor editing." Nevertheless, the film was nominated for an Academy Award for Lucien Ballard's cinematography.

Bartlett produced A Global Affair (1964), a story about the first baby ever born in the headquarters of the United Nations in New York City, which starred Bob Hope and Lilo Pulver and was directed by Jack Arnold. Bartlett got along with neither the star nor the director, and the resulting film pleased nobody.

Sol Madrid (1968) was made from the Robert Wilder novel, Fruit of the Poppy. It was directed by Brian G. Hutton, and starred David McCallum, Stella Stevens, Telly Savalas, and Ricardo Montalbán. New York Times critic Renata Adler wrote that "The plot is old fashioned and solid, about the police and the Mafia, and running heroin from Mexico…it was like a great episode in a firstclass TV serial."

Changes (1969), a strongly personal examination of the younger generation, was filmed in college communities across the country to record honest insights into issues of the day. While reviews were mixed — film critic John Simon described it as 'an abomination' — The New York Times called the film "one of the most imaginative, haunting and artistic movies yet made. It is a remarkable film and – more than that – a remarkable experience." After a number of studio films, Bartlett returned to independent filmmaking with Changes, distributing it through the Cinerama Releasing Corporation.

=== 1970s ===
The Sandpit Generals (1971) received international acclaim and was entered into the 7th Moscow International Film Festival. Also released in the USA as The Defiant or The Wild Pack, the film never attained success at home. However, in the Soviet Union, the movie became so well-known that it inspired theater plays, books, special reports on post-Soviet criminal youth etc.

Bartlett's next film, Jonathan Livingston Seagull (1973), based on the 1970 novella of the same name by Richard Bach, would prove to be his most famous achievement as a director. So fascinated was Bartlett by the story that he declared, "I was born to make this movie." He commented, "I felt I had to make this film. I feel very strongly that we're in an age in motion pictures, in all the arts and in life generally, of negativity. People feel that the cards are stacked against them personally so that no one can win. I think Jonathan Livingston Seagull has been such a tremendous success as a novel because it is very positive on terms that any human being can relate to. It says that inside every person is the potential to be something more. By looking into yourself and knowing yourself and reaching for the best within yourself, you or I or anyone can have a different kind of life. That to me is the most needed thing of our time."

However, the release of Jonathan Livingston Seagull was plagued by lawsuits. Bach, who had written the initial adapted screenplay, sued Paramount Pictures before the film's release, arguing that the film no longer resembled his script. Bartlett had allegedly violated a term in his contract with Bach which stated that no changes could be made to the film's adaptation without Bach's approval. Associate Producer Leslie Parrish was appointed to be a mediator between Bach and Bartlett, but the mediation failed. The judge ordered the studio to make some re-edits before it was released. Bach eventually had his name removed from the screenwriting credits.

Neil Diamond sued Bartlett for cutting much of his music from the film. Diamond was also upset when music composer Lee Holdridge wanted to share credit with him. Bartlett was ordered to reinstate the five minutes of Diamond's music score and three of his songs, "Anthem", "Prologue" and "Dear Father", and that the onscreen credits were to state "Music and songs by Neil Diamond", "Background score composed and adapted by Neil Diamond and Lee Holdridge" and "Music supervision by Tom Catalano".

The Children of Sanchez (1978) was written for the screen by Cesare Zavattini based on Oscar Lewis's book of the same title, a classic study of a Mexican family played by Anthony Quinn, Dolores del Río, and Lupita Ferrer (Bartlett's then-wife at the time). This film is better known for its Grammy award-winning musical score by Chuck Mangione. The film was entered into the 11th Moscow International Film Festival. However, like many of Bartlett's later films, the film received only a limited release, and was a box office failure.

=== 1980s ===
Bartlett's final film, the 1983 TV movie, Love is Forever, was based on the true story of one of the most daring escapes in modern history. John Everingham (played in the film by Michael Landon) rescued his Laotian fiancée under the watchful guns of the Pathet Lao Army, executing an unforgettable, exciting, dangerous, and life-risking plan. The plan demanded a year's careful training and study, after Everingham, a top reporter, was imprisoned in Laos, then expelled from the country with a high price for his murder if he ever returned. Bartlett filmed Love Is Forever in Thailand. He is the first person to get permission to shoot on the Mekong River, two miles away from the Army of Laos.

Landon and Bartlett clashed often during the production over a variety of issues with Bartlett eventually editing the film in secret to avoid Landon's interference.

== Personal life and death ==
Bartlett was heavily involved in the Los Angeles community as a founder of the Music Center, a director of the James Doolittle Theatre, a patron of the Art Museum, a patron of the American Youth Symphony, a board member of KCET, and organizer of the Los Angeles Rams Club and the Los Angeles Lakers Basketball Club.

Bartlett's first novel, The Rest of Our Lives, was a best seller in 1988. He partnered with Michael J. Lasky and developed a dozen projects for the eleven years prior to his death. One of these projects included the film Catch Me If You Can. Bartlett and Lasky both wrote and drafted many scripts for the project with Hall positioned as the director and Lasky producing. The rights were eventually sold and produced/directed by Steven Spielberg, nineteen years after Lasky's first option. In his last days, they were working on a three-picture slate which included the re-mastering of Jonathan Livingston Seagull. The production team grew to include Robert Watts, known for being one of the producers on a number of Spielberg and Lucas films.

Bartlett died on September 8, 1993, at the age of 70. He experienced complications from a hip operation and died while being transported from his home in Los Angeles to a hospital. At the time of his death, he was finishing his second novel for Random House, Face to Face.

== Awards ==
Bartlett's films have received ten Best Picture and Best Director awards at various international film festivals, seventeen Academy Award nominations, eight Hollywood Foreign Press Golden Globe Awards, and more than 75 national and international awards from publications and organizations.
