= Nothing by Chance =

- Theatrical release poster
- Directed by: William H. Barnett
- Screenplay by: Richard D. Bach
- Based on: Nothing by Chance by Richard Bach
- Produced by: William H. Barnett
- Starring: Richard D. Bach; Jack Brown; Chris Cagle; Stuart Macpherson; Spence Nelson; Glenn Norman; Steve Young
- Narrated by: Hugh Downs
- Cinematography: Flemming Olsen
- Edited by: Fred Helnrich
- Music by: Lee Holdridge
- Production companies: Creature Enterprises; Ravlin Productions
- Distributed by: R.C. Riddell and Associates
- Release date: January 30, 1975
- Running time: 93 minutes
- Country: United States
- Language: English

Nothing by Chance is a 1975 American documentary film based on the 1969 book by Richard Bach, Nothing by Chance: A Gypsy Pilot's Adventures in Modern America. The film centers on modern barnstorming around the United States in the 1970s. One of the driving forces behind the production, star Richard Bach, is a pilot in real life, and recruited a group of his friends who were also pilots to recreate the era of the barnstormer.

== Plot ==
In the 1970s, five pilots become the Great American Flying Circus and embark on a barnstorming tour in the United States. Richard D. Bach, Jack Brown, Chris Cagle, Stuart Macpherson and Spence Nelson, along with parachutist Steve Young, perform their shows in several Midwestern towns, beginning with Cook, Nebraska, recreating the earlier era of the 1920s, when pilots went from place to place, hawking rides in the air. Glenn Norman sells tickets for a joyride for $3 and finds the customers are both young people and those who remember the original barnstormers.

== Cast ==
- Richard D. Bach as himself
- Jack Brown as himself
- Chris Cagle as himself
- Stuart Macpherson as himself
- Spence Nelson as himself
- Glenn Norman as ticket taker
- Steve Young as himself

== Production ==
Richard Bach has a lifelong love affair with flying, from his earliest flight as a teenager. As an adult, Bach served in the United States Navy Reserve, then in the New Jersey Air National Guard's 108th Fighter Wing, 141st Fighter Squadron (USAF) as a Republic F-84F Thunderstreak fighter pilot. Later, working as a technical writer for Douglas Aircraft and contributing editor for Flying magazine, he began to write about flying; Stranger to the Ground (1963) was his first book.

Bach became a barnstormer, and his next two books, Biplane (1966) and Nothing by Chance (1969) celebrated the joy of flying as a barnstormer. In Nothing by Chance, he set out on an adventure one summer, flying an antique biplane, sleeping under the wing, taking passengers for a joyride and meeting people who, in many cases, remembered the golden age of flight. The film that became a continuation of his stories and adventures in the mid-1960s, brought together many of his friends, including Hugh Downs, who acted as executive producer and narrator. Most of the pilots were American, but Canadian author and pilot Glenn Norman was asked to participate, although he did not have a U.S. commercial license. His role became that of a barker/ticket taker and the "voice" of the Great American Flying Circus.

Filming took place in 1973 in Midwestern locales, with a documentary-style of "as it happened" that incorporated spectators with actors to recreate the era. The aircraft used included a Parks P-2 and Travel Air 4000.

The song "Life Song", written by Dennis Lambert and Brian Potter, was performed by Denny Doherty and is featured in the title credits. The soundtrack also included "Flying On" with music by Lee Holdridge and lyrics by director William H. Barnett.

== Reception ==
Nothing by Chance had a television premiere on NBC, but was never widely released as a theatrical version. In his review for The New York Times, Lawrence Van Gelder wrote: "Filmed in color as the members of the self-proclaimed Great American Flying Circus, established 1922, hopscotched across middle America, landing in pastures and stubble fields to sell rides at $3 to small-town residents, it is at its best in the air. It is then that this film needs none of the forgettable narration written by Mr. Bach and delivered with furry smoothness by Hugh Downs to sell the romance of flying the brighly [sic]colored little 1929 biplanes or the equally impressive glories of the countryside below. But when the participants come to earth and labor, at times painfully, to wrench mystique and profundity out of flying, planes and the Grant Wood people its cameras favor, "Nothing by Chance" lapses into tedium. None of the talk can make it more than what it is—a simple valentine to a bygone era, full of bright color and shallow sentiment."

In an anonymous Aerofiles review, the film was praised for its aerial scenes, but "... Beautiful cinematography wasn't enough to captivate a general audience."

In a recent reappraisal, participant Glenn Norman considered the film from the standpoint of historical accuracy: "... the real reason most 1920's Barnstormers were out there. Not for the love of flying (like Bach’s Barnstormers in 'Nothing By Chance' but – in the words of Cliff Robertson’s Ace Eli, "... because the whole damn thing is about me. ... Recommended for people who like Barnstorming, old Biplanes (Travel Airs), Richard Bach … or me."

== See also ==
- The Great Waldo Pepper (1975)
- Ace Eli and Rodger of the Skies (1973)
