= Illusions (Bach novel) =

1977 novel by Richard Bach

Illusions: The Adventures of a Reluctant Messiah
- First edition cover
- Author: Richard Bach
- Language: English
- Genre: Philosophical novel Spiritual
- Publisher: Dell Publishing Co., Inc.
- Publication date: 1977
- Publication place: United States
- Media type: Print (Paperback) & AudioBook (Cassette)
- Pages: 143 pages
- ISBN: 0-440-04318-2
- OCLC: 2870699

Illusions: The Adventures of a Reluctant Messiah is a novel by writer and pilot Richard Bach. First published in 1977, the story questions the reader's view of reality, proposing that what we call reality is merely an illusion we create for learning and enjoyment. Illusions was the author's follow-up to 1970's Jonathan Livingston Seagull.

== Plot ==
Illusions revolves around two barnstorming pilots who meet in a field in the Midwestern United States. The two main characters enter into a teacher-student relationship that explains the concept that the world that we inhabit is illusory, as well as the underlying reality behind it:

'What if somebody came along who could teach me how my world works and how to control it? ... What if a Siddhartha came to our time, with power over the illusions of the world because he knew the reality behind them? And what if I could meet him in person, if he was flying a biplane, for instance, and landed in the same meadow with me?'

Donald William Shimoda is a messiah who quits his job after deciding that people value the showbiz-like performance of miracles and want to be entertained by those miracles more than to understand the message behind them. He meets Richard, a fellow barn-storming pilot. Both are in the business of providing short rides—for a few dollars each—in vintage biplanes to passengers from farmers' fields they find during their travels. Donald initially captures Richard's attention when a grandfather and granddaughter pair arrive at the makeshift airstrip. Ordinarily it is elders who are cautious and the youngsters who are keen to fly. In this case, however, the grandfather wants to fly but the granddaughter is afraid of flying. Donald explains to the granddaughter that her fear of flying comes from a traumatic experience in a past life, and this calms her fears and she is ready to fly. Observing this greatly intrigues Richard, so Donald begins to pass on his knowledge to him, even teaching Richard to perform "miracles" of his own.

The novel features quotes from the Messiah's Handbook, owned by Shimoda, which Richard later takes as his own. An unusual aspect of this handbook is that it has no page numbers. The reason for this, as Shimoda explains to Richard, is that the book will open to the page on which the reader may find guidance or the answers to doubts and questions in his mind. It is not a magical book; Shimoda explains that one can do this with any sort of text. The Messiah's Handbook was released as its own title by Hampton Roads Publishing Company. It mimics the one described in Illusions, with new quotes based on the philosophies in the novel.

== Adaptations ==
An adaptation of Illusions was serialized in the comic strip Best Sellers Showcase running June 19 through July 30, 1978.

Director Zack Snyder, wrote a script based on the book, and has cited it as a major influence on his 2011 film Sucker Punch and his 2021 film Army of the Dead.

== 2014 sequel ==
In 2014, Bach published Illusions II: The Adventures of a Reluctant Student after surviving a serious plane crash.

== See also ==
- Simulated reality
