= Jonathan Livingston Seagull (film) =

1973 American drama film by Hall Bartlett

- Theatrical poster
- Directed by: Hall Bartlett
- Screenplay by: Hall Bartlett; Richard Bach (uncredited)
- Based on: Jonathan Livingston Seagull by Richard Bach
- Produced by: Hall Bartlett
- Starring: James Franciscus; Juliet Mills; Hal Holbrook
- Cinematography: Jack Couffer
- Edited by: Frank P. Keller; James Galloway
- Music by: Neil Diamond
- Distributed by: Paramount Pictures
- Release date: October 23, 1973
- Running time: 99 minutes
- Country: United States
- Language: English
- Budget: $1.5 million
- Box office: $1.6 million

Jonathan Livingston Seagull is a 1973 American drama film directed by Hall Bartlett, adapted from the 1970 novella of the same name by Richard Bach. The film tells the story of a young seabird who, after being cast out by his stern flock, goes on an odyssey to discover how to break the limits of his own flying speed. The film was produced by filming actual seagulls, then superimposing human dialogue over it. The film's voice actors included James Franciscus in the title role, and Philip Ahn as his mentor, Chiang.

Whereas the original novella was a commercial success, the film version was poorly received by critics, though it was nominated for two Academy Awards: Best Cinematography and Best Film Editing. The soundtrack album, written and recorded by Neil Diamond, was a critical and commercial success, earning Diamond a Grammy Award and a Golden Globe Award.

== Plot ==
As the film begins, Jonathan Livingston Seagull is soaring through the sky hoping to travel at a speed more than 60 miles per hour (100 km/h). Eventually, with luck he is able to break that barrier. When Jonathan returns to his own flock he is greeted with anything but applause. The Elders of the flock shame Jonathan for doing things the other seagulls never dare to do.

Jonathan pleads to stay and claims that he wants to share his newfound discovery with everybody, but the Elders dismiss him as an outcast, and he is banished from the flock. Jonathan goes off on his own, explores the world, and eventually dies. However, he is soon greeted in the "Other World" by mysterious seagulls who assure him that his talent is a unique one, and with them Jonathan is trained to become independent and proud of his beliefs. Eventually, Jonathan himself ends up becoming a mentor for other seagulls who are suffering the same fate in their own flocks, as he once did.

== Voice cast ==
- James Franciscus as Jonathan Livingston Seagull, a seagull who is bored with daily squabbles for food.
- Juliet Mills as Maureen, Jonathan's love interest.
- Hal Holbrook as The Elder, who banished Jonathan out of the seagull flock.
- Dorothy McGuire as Jonathan's mother.
- Richard Crenna as Jonathan's father.
- Philip Ahn as Chiang, Jonathan's mentor.
- Kelly Harmon as Kimmy
- David Ladd as Fletcher Lynd Seagull
- Hall Bartlett as the hawk

== Production ==
Director Hall Bartlett first read the book Jonathan Livingston Seagull in a San Fernando Valley barbershop when he impulsively decided to call the publisher, Macmillan, and then author Richard Bach, to buy the film rights. Bartlett suggested that the story needed to be told simply, without animation or actors, and acquired the property for $100,000 and fifty percent of the profits. He granted Bach final approval rights on the film and all advertising and merchandising "gimmickry.” During production, Bartlett declared, "I was born to make this movie."

Leslie Parrish was hired by Bartlett to be the film's Associate Producer. She played a role in hiring cinematographer Jack Couffer (who was later nominated for the Academy Award for Best Cinematography for his work) as well as aerial cameraman Jim Freeman. Parrish also chose several of the film's locations, and she helped to take care of the film's seagulls, many of whom were corralled in a suite at a local Holiday Inn in Carmel, CA. However, Bartlett ultimately demoted Parrish's credit from Associate Producer to "Researcher".

== Working with the birds ==
To train the birds needed for the production, Hall Bartlett hired veteran animal trainer Ray Berwick, best known for his work on Alfred Hitchcock's The Birds. However, shortly after Jonathan Livingston Seagull started production, Berwick had an unexpected heart attack, so his younger apprentice, Gary Gero, took over the majority of the bird-training duties. Berwick later accused Bartlett of pressuring him more than any director he'd previously worked with; Bartlett subsequently apologized to Berwick.

A 1975 New York Times article by T.E.D. Klein alleged, "During filming of Paramount's Jonathan Livingston Seagull, dozens of birds were reportedly killed by caustic bleaches and hair sprays, others were crippled by control cords, and some 88 suffered eye injuries". However, Gero has denied that there was such animal cruelty on the set, responding that instead there was "trainer" cruelty, since trainers were often bitten by the birds. Leslie Parrish has confirmed that she and her hairdresser helped bleach the seagulls' wings white, but has insisted that she fiercely protected the birds that were under her supervision, while also acknowledging that she wasn't in favor of the way that Berwick handled the birds.

The sequence where a hawk attacks Jonathan did not appear in the original book. The scene does, however, appear in Richard Bach's initial shooting screenplay; Bach later admitted that he may have agreed to write the scene for the film, but changed his mind once he saw the finished scene, when he was appalled by its violence. Gary Gero has confirmed that he personally trained the two birds for the sequence, and that the hawk's talons were protected so that it wouldn't injure the seagull playing Jonathan. Gero states that during filming, he was actually more worried about the hawk's safety than the seagull's safety, since seagulls can be equally vicious.

== Lawsuits ==
The film was the subject of three lawsuits that were filed around the time of the film's release. Author Richard Bach sued Paramount Pictures before the film's release for having too many discrepancies between the film and Bach's adapted screenplay. Director Bartlett had allegedly violated a term in his contract with Bach which stated that no changes could be made to the film's adaptation without Bach's approval. Associate Producer Leslie Parrish was appointed to be a mediator between Bach and Bartlett, but the mediation failed. Bach eventually had his name removed from the screenwriting credits.

The judge ordered the studio to make some re-edits before it was released. Bach's attorney claimed, "It took tremendous courage to say this motion picture had to come out of theaters unless it was changed. Paramount was stunned."

Neil Diamond sued Bartlett for cutting much of his music from the film. Diamond was also upset when music composer Lee Holdridge wanted to share credit with him. Bartlett was ordered to reinstate the five minutes of Diamond's music score and three of his songs, "Anthem", "Prologue" and "Dear Father", and that the onscreen credits were to state "Music and songs by Neil Diamond", "Background score composed and adapted by Neil Diamond and Lee Holdridge" and "Music supervision by Tom Catalano".

After his experience with the film, Diamond stated that he "vowed never to get involved in a movie again unless I had complete control." Bartlett angrily responded to the lawsuit by criticizing Diamond's music as having become "too slick... and it's not as much from his heart as it used to be." However, Bartlett also added, "Neil is extraordinarily talented. Often his arrogance is just a cover for the lonely and insecure person underneath."

Director Ovady Julber also sued the film, claiming it stole scenes from his 1936 film La Mer. The suit was dismissed without a trial, petitioned on the grounds that extensive public school and cultural use of the film had robbed it of common-law copyright protection.

== Reception ==
The film received mainly negative reviews at the time of its release. Roger Ebert, who awarded it only one out of four stars, claimed that he had walked out of the screening after forty-five minutes, making it one of the few films he walked out on, writing: "This has got to be the biggest pseudocultural, would-be metaphysical ripoff of the year." Gene Siskel gave the film one-and-a-half stars out of four and called "the dumbest, most patronizing movie of this or any other year."

Variety described the film as "a combination of teenybopper psychedelics, facile moralizing, Pollyanna polemic, and superb nature photography." Charles Champlin of the Los Angeles Times called it "a very beautiful and ingenious movie to look at" but noted, "The line between a fitting solemnity and outright farce is very, very thin and it is here rudely violated again and again." Gary Arnold of The Washington Post wrote, "Try as he may, Bartlett cannot put Bach's words convincingly into the beaks of even trained seagulls. It's an impossibility and an abomination, an affront to man and bird and the general fitness of things."

Others used bird-related puns in their reviews, including The New York Times critic Frank Rich, who called it "strictly for the birds." David McGillivray of The Monthly Film Bulletin was somewhat more positive, writing, "Heady stuff this is, probably appealing only to those already converted. But as a striking technical achievement, the film deserves recognition."

In his film review column for Glamour magazine, Michael Korda considered the film "a parable couched in the form of a nature film of overpowering beauty and strength in which, perhaps to our horror, we are forced to recognize ourselves in a seagull obsessed with the heights".

On the review aggregator website Rotten Tomatoes, 8% of 13 critics' reviews are positive.

== Awards and honors ==
The film was nominated for the 1973 Academy Awards for Best Cinematography (Jack Couffer) and Best Film Editing (Frank P. Keller and James Galloway).

== Home media ==
Previously only available on VHS, it was released on DVD on October 23, 2007. It was released again on DVD on a manufactured-on-demand (MOD) basis through the Warner Archive Collection June 25, 2013.

In July 2020, Via Vision Entertainment announced a brand new Imprint Blu-ray release of the film. The Blu-ray was released worldwide in October 2020. Special features included an exclusive commentary track by filmmaker Adam Zanzie.
