= For Love or Money (1963 film) =

1963 film by Michael Gordon

- Directed by: Michael Gordon
- Written by: Larry Markes; Michael Morris
- Produced by: Robert Arthur
- Starring: Kirk Douglas; Mitzi Gaynor; Gig Young; Thelma Ritter
- Cinematography: Clifford Stine
- Edited by: Alma Macrorie
- Music by: Frank De Vol
- Distributed by: Universal-International
- Release date: August 7, 1963
- Running time: 108 minutes
- Country: United States
- Language: English
- Box office: $1,750,000 (US/ Canada)

For Love or Money is a 1963 romantic comedy film distributed by Universal International, produced by Robert Arthur, directed by Michael Gordon, and starring Kirk Douglas, Mitzi Gaynor, and Gig Young. It was written by Larry Markes and Michael Morris, and released on August 7, 1963. The supporting cast features Thelma Ritter, Leslie Parrish, Julie Newmar and William Bendix.

This is the last film starring Gaynor before her retirement from acting in feature films.

== Plot ==
Lawyer Donald Kenneth "Deke" Gentry is given the task of playing matchmaker for the three daughters of his wealthy client Chloe Brasher.

== Cast ==
- Kirk Douglas as Donald Kenneth "Deke" Gentry
- Mitzi Gaynor as Kate Brasher
- Gig Young as John "Sonny" Dayton Smith
- Thelma Ritter as Chloe Brasher
- Julie Newmar as Bonnie Brasher
- William Bendix as Joe Fogel
- Leslie Parrish as Jan Brasher
- Dick Sargent (credited as Richard Sargent) as Harvey Wofford
- Elizabeth McRae as Marsha
- William Windom as Sam Travis
- Pedro Gonzalez Gonzalez as Jose
- Billy Halop as the elevator operator

== Production ==
After appearing in a variety of films such as westerns and historical epics, Kirk Douglas was starring in a romantic comedy film, a genre that many people were not used to seeing him in.

Mitzi Gaynor has not appeared in any other film after For Love or Money. She stated that she was "too ordinary for films" and that she would be better off entertaining audiences through different ventures.

Prolific supporting actor William Bendix, extremely popular in the 1940s, only appeared in three more theatrical films after this one.

Douglas' car in this movie is a red 1962 Chrysler 300 Sport Convertible.

== Reception ==
Leslie Parrish was nominated for a Golden Globe as "Most Promising Newcomer - Female" for her performance in this film.

Many people noted that this film was similar to romantic comedies made famous by the classic comedy team of Rock Hudson and Doris Day (though there is a line in the film where Douglas' character asks Windom's "haven't you ever seen a Cary Grant movie?"). Supporting actors like Thelma Ritter and Gig Young, who, starred with Hudson and Day in other films, make an appearance here. Some were fairly critical of Douglas' performance in a romantic comedy film while others were pleasantly surprised by the actor's versatility.

== Home media ==
Universal released this film in 2013 as a stand-alone DVD from the print-on-demand Universal Vault Series. In 2016, it was re-released as part of the Kirk Douglas Centennial Collection, a five-disc set featuring seven other films (Spartacus, Man Without a Star, The Last Sunset, Lonely Are the Brave, The List of Adrian Messenger, The War Wagon, and A Lovely Way to Die).
