= One (Bach novel) =

1988 novel by Richard Bach

- First edition
- Author: Richard Bach
- Subject: Metaphysics, Alternate worlds
- Published: 1988, William Morrow
- Media type: print
- Pages: 400
- ISBN: 044020562X

One is a 1988 novel by Richard Bach about what could happen in an alternate world. The characters are based on Bach and his wife, Leslie Parrish.

== Synopsis ==
The author Richard and his wife Leslie have come under a spell of quantum physics. As a result, they find themselves in an alternate world, existing in different incarnations at the same time. First it is as if they were themselves, but living sixteen years in the past, on the day that they first met. In this alternate version of their lives they do not wed, and neither finds the happiness that they've achieved in their actual life. In another universe they find a world without war, where both Leslie and Richard are pilots in nonviolent war games. In a trip to the past they meet Attila the Hun. In another world they meet a saint who has discovered the meaning of life, but immediately burns the evidence, knowing that it would only cause division and ultimately, holy war. They meet the spirit who gives Richard his writing inspiration. They travel to a world where Richard is a bitter, dying man; a world where Leslie has left Richard; and a world where Leslie has died in a plane crash and Richard contemplates suicide.

== Reviews ==
- "Under the spell of quantum physics, Bach and his wife Leslie are catapulted into an alternate world in which they exist simultaneously in many different incarnations." "These little homilies can either be uplifting or mightily boring, depending on the reader's point of view." —Publishers Weekly
- "Instead of soaring and diving through space, passengers on this flight must be prepared to cruise slowly, making several stops to look at their motivation and lifestyles as the Bachs look at their own." —Detroit Free Press
- "This is a strange and thought-provoking fantasy from the man who gave us Jonathan Livingston Seagull and Illusions, one that is imaginative, playful, and in places, startling in concept." —The Anniston Star
