= Illusions II: The Adventures of a Reluctant Student =

2014 novel by Richard Bach

- Author: Richard Bach
- Language: English
- Genre: Philosophical novel Spiritual; Self-help
- Publisher: Dell Publishing
- Publication date: 2014
- Publication place: United States
- ISBN: 978-1-4953-4501-2

Illusions II: The Adventures of a Reluctant Student is a 2014 novel by writer and pilot Richard Bach. The first Illusions book was published in 1977 and was an international best-seller, telling the story of a pilot who encounters a messiah who has absconded from the "job" of being a messiah. The sequel is in author Bach's own voice, as his "imaginary" literary characters help him in his recovery from his real-life plane crash in August 2012.

== Plot ==
After decades of flying without incident, author Richard Bach is near-fatally injured in a horrific plane crash. The injuries leave him hospital-bound for months, where he delves into the "imaginary" world of his literary creations, and uses them as inspiration to heal his body, mind, and soul.

== See also ==
- Simulated reality
