= Hampton Roads Publishing Company =

- Founded: 1989; 36 years ago
- Founder: Frank DeMarco and Bob Friedman
- Country of origin: United States
- Headquarters location: Newburyport, Massachusetts
- Distribution: Red Wheel/Weiser
- Publication types: Books
- Nonfiction topics: Metaphysical subjects including visionary fiction, alternative medicine, self-help, New Science
- Official website: hrpub.com

Hampton Roads Publishing Company, founded in 1989 by Frank DeMarco and Bob Friedman, is a publisher of self-help books, and books on alternative medicine, visionary fiction, New Thought, New Science, Nagualism and psychic realms.

Hampton Roads sold Walsch's Conversations with God: Book I to Susan J. Petersen, who published it for Putnam.
