= Jonathan Livingston Seagull =

1970 novella by Richard Bach

Jonathan Livingston Seagull: A Story
- First edition
- Author: Richard Bach
- Illustrator: Russell Munson (black-and-white photographs)
- Language: English
- Subject: The life of Jonathan Livingston Seagull, a seagull.
- Genre: Spiritual, self-help, novella
- Publisher: Macmillan Publishers (United States)
- Publication date: 1970, 2014
- Media type: Print (paperback)
- Pages: 144 (The Complete Edition)
- ISBN: 978-1-4767-9331-3 (2014 paperback edition)
- OCLC: 6158608

Jonathan Livingston Seagull is an allegorical fable in novella form written by American author Richard Bach and illustrated with black-and-white photographs shot by Russell Munson. It is about a seagull who is trying to learn about flying, personal reflection, freedom, and self-realization. It was first published in book form in 1970 with little advertising or expectations; by the end of 1972, over a million copies were in print, the book having reached the number-one spot on bestseller lists mostly through word of mouth recommendations.

In 2014, the book was reissued as Jonathan Livingston Seagull: The Complete Edition, which added a 17-page fourth part to the story.

== Plot ==
=== Part One ===
Jonathan Livingston Seagull is an independent thinker, frustrated with the daily squabbles over meager food and sheer survival within his flock of seagulls, who have no deeper sense of purpose. Unlike his peers, he is seized with a passion for flight of all kinds, and his soul soars as he aerially experiments and learns more about the nature of his own body and the environment in achieving faster and faster flights. Eventually, his lack of conformity within the Flock causes them to officially banish him with the label "Outcast". Undeterred, Jonathan continues his efforts to reach ever-greater flight goals, finding that he is often successful. He lives a long, happy life, and is sad not due to his loneliness but only due to the fact that the rest of the Flock will never know the full glories of flying, like him. In his old age, he is met by two radiantly-bright seagulls who share his abilities, explaining to him that he has learned much, but that they have come to take him "home" where he will go "higher".

=== Part Two ===
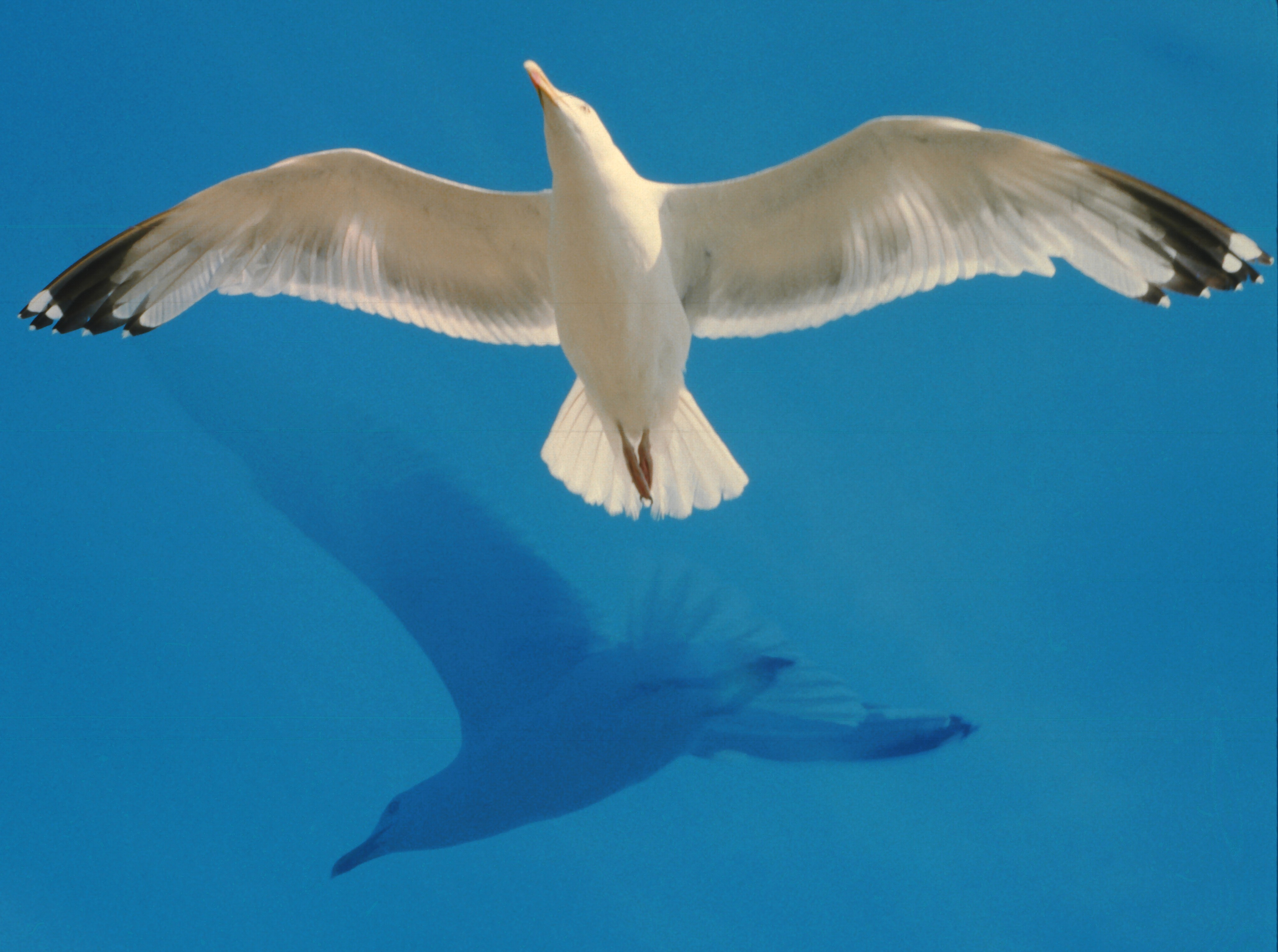
"Jonathan transcends into a reality, which he assumes is heaven"

Jonathan transcends into a reality, which he assumes is heaven, where all the gulls enjoy practicing incredible maneuvers and speeds, like him. His instructor, Sullivan, explains that a few gulls progress to this higher existence, but most others live through the same world over and over again. The Elder Gull of the community, Chiang, admits that this reality is not heaven, but that heaven is the achieving of perfection itself: an ability beyond any particular time or place. Suddenly, Chiang disappears, then reappears a moment later, displaying his attainment of perfect speed. When Jonathan begs to learn Chiang's skills, Chiang explains that the secret to true flight is to recognize that one's nature exists across all time and space. Jon begins successfully following Chiang's teachings. One day, Chiang slowly transforms into a blindingly luminous being and, just before disappearing for the last time, he gives Jonathan one last tip: "keep working on love." Jonathan ponders Chiang's words and, in a discussion with Sullivan, decides to go back to his own home planet, to teach his original Flock all that he has learned. Returning there, he finds a fellow lover of flying, Fletcher Lynd Seagull, who is angry at recently being "Outcast" by the Flock. Jonathan takes on Fletcher as his first pupil.

=== Part Three ===
Jonathan has now amassed a small group of Outcasts as flying students, with Fletcher the star pupil, and tells them that "each of us is in truth... an unlimited idea of freedom". The deeper nature of his words is not yet understood by his pupils, who believe they are just getting basic flying lessons. For a month, Jonathan boldly takes them to perform aerial stunts in front of the bewildered Flock. Some of the Flock slowly join the Outcasts, while others label him a messiah or a devil; Jonathan feels misunderstood. One day, Fletcher dies in a flying collision. Awaking in another reality, he hears Jonathan's voice teasing him that the trick to transcending the limitations of time and space is to take it step by step — not so quickly. Fletcher is resurrected in the very midst of the flabbergasted Flock, some of whom fear and decry his supernatural reappearance, but Jonathan insists that he must learn to love the ignorant Flock. Jonathan's body suddenly begins to fade away, he requests that Fletcher stop others from thinking of him as anything silly like a god, and he gives a final piece of advice: "find out what you already know". Soon, Fletcher faces a group of eager new students of his own. He passes on Jonathan's sentiments that seagulls are limitless ideas of freedom and their bodies nothing more than thought itself, but this only baffles the young gulls. He realizes now why Jonathan taught him to take lessons slowly, step by step. Privately musing on Jonathan's idea that there are no limits, Fletcher smiles at the implication of this: that he will see Jonathan again, one day soon.

=== Part Four (in the 2014 reprint, Jonathan Livingston Seagull: The Complete Edition) ===
In 2013, Richard Bach took up a non-published fourth part of the book, which he had written contemporaneously with the original. He edited and polished it and then sent the result to a publisher. Bach reported that he was inspired to finish the fourth part of the novella by a near-death experience which had occurred in relation to a nearly fatal plane crash in August 2012. In February 2014, the 138-page Bach work Illusions II: The Adventures of a Reluctant Student was published as a booklet by Kindle Direct Publishing. Illusions II also contains allusions to and insights regarding the same near-death experience. In October 2014, Jonathan Livingston Seagull: The Complete Edition, was published, and this edition includes Part Four of the story.

Part Four focuses on the period several hundred years after Jonathan and his students have left the Flock, and their teachings become venerated rather than practised. The birds spend all their time extolling the virtues of Jonathan and his students and spend no time flying for flying's sake. The seagulls practice strange rituals and use demonstrations of their respect for Jonathan and his students as status symbols. Eventually, some birds reject the ceremony and rituals and just start flying. A bird, named Anthony Gull, questions the value of living since "life is pointless and since pointless is by definition meaningless then the only proper act is to dive into the ocean and drown. Better not to exist at all than to exist like a seaweed, without meaning or joy [...] He had to die sooner or later anyway, and he saw no reason to prolong the painful boredom of living." As Anthony makes a dive-bomb to the sea, at a speed and from an altitude which would kill him, a white blur flashes alongside him. Anthony catches up to the blur, which turns out to be a seagull, and asks what the bird was doing.

== Development ==
Bach, who was himself a pilot, said the concept for the book came to him as "a visionesque spooky thing". He stopped the project after he wrote 10 pages and did not pick it up again for a few years. He initially wrote it as a series of short stories that were published in the late 1960s in Private Pilot magazine, as well as in Soaring, the magazine of the Soaring Society of America.

The main character is thought to be named after John H. Livingston, an American air race pilot and Waco Aircraft Company test pilot of the 1920s and 1930. However, in the book The Nature of Personal Reality by Jane Roberts, Richard Bach states that in 1959 he was walking beside a canal and heard a voice say "Jonathan Livingston Seagull" — putting into question the idea that the protagonist was named after a particular person.

The book was rejected by several publishers before coming to the attention of Eleanor Friede at Macmillan in 1969. "I think it has a chance of growing into a long-lasting standard book for readers of all ages", she wrote in her acquisition memo. She convinced Macmillan to buy it and Bach received a $2,000 advance (equivalent to $18,000 in 2025).

== Reception ==
The book was a sleeper hit; the first edition in 1970 was only 3,000 copies and it would take two years before reaching number one on the New York Times Bestseller List. "Not a single magazine or newspaper — including The New York Times Book Review — so much as mentioned" the book when it first came out, The Times reported in 1972. Macmillan failed to secure any advance publicity for Bach, but he personally took out two very small ads in The New York Times Book Review and Publishers Weekly. The first printing sold out by the end of 1970, and in 1971 an additional 140,000 copies were printed. Mostly a word of mouth phenomenon, it entered the NYT Bestseller List on April 20, 1972, where it remained for 37 weeks, and by July 1972 it had 440,000 copies in print. Reader's Digest published a condensed version. In 1972 and 1973, the book topped the Publishers Weekly list of bestselling novels in the United States.

Book sellers did not know how to classify it. "Some put it under nature, some under religion, some under photography, some under children's books." Friede's advice was, "put it next to the cash register."

Several early commentators, emphasizing the first part of the book, see it as part of the US self-help and positive thinking culture, epitomized by Norman Vincent Peale and by the New Thought movement. In a review of the 1973 adaptation, film critic Roger Ebert wrote that the book was "so banal that it had to be sold to adults; kids would have seen through it."

The book is listed as one of fifty "timeless spiritual classics" in a book by Tom Butler-Bowdon, who noted that "it is easy now, thirty-five years on, to overlook the originality of the book's concept, and though some find it rather naïve, in fact it expresses timeless ideas about human potential."

John Clute, for The Encyclopedia of Fantasy (1997), wrote: "an animal fantasy about a philosophical gull who is profoundly affected by flying, but who demands too much of his community and is cast out by it. He becomes an extremely well-behaved accursed wanderer, then dies, and in posthumous fantasy sequences--though he is too wise really to question the fact of death, and too calmly confident to have doubts about his continuing upward mobility--he learns greater wisdom. Back on Earth, he continues to preach and heal and finally returns to heaven, where he belongs."

It has however been very poorly received by the birding community, where it is regarded as sentimental anthropomorphic nonsense; Bill Oddie was particularly scathing, writing "I mean, no half-serious birdwatcher could enjoy (let alone write!) a book called, with such offensive imprecision, Jonathan Livingston-Seagull ... I mean, you write me Jonathan Livingston-Second Winter Lesser Black-backed Gull and I might get off on it".

== Film adaptation ==
The novella inspired the production of a film of the same title in 1973. The film was made by Hall Bartlett many years before computer-generated effects were available. In order to make seagulls act on cue and perform aerobatics, Mark Smith of Escondido, California built radio-controlled gliders that looked like real seagulls from a few feet away. This footage was not used in the final cut of the film.

Bach had written the film's initial adapted screenplay, but he sued Bartlett and Paramount Pictures before the film's release, arguing that there were too many discrepancies between the film and his script. Director Bartlett had allegedly violated a term in his contract with Bach which stated that no changes could be made to the film's adaptation without Bach's approval. Ultimately, the court ruled that Bach's name would be taken off the screenplay credits, and that the film would be released with a card indicating that Bach disapproved of the final cut. Bach's attorney claimed, "It took tremendous courage to say this motion picture had to come out of theaters unless it was changed. Paramount was stunned."

The Grammy Award-winning soundtrack album was composed and performed by Neil Diamond and produced by Tom Catalano. It won the 1974 Grammy Award as Best Original Score Written for a Motion Picture or a Television Special. The album apparently also made more money than the film, selling two million copies in the United States, 400,000 in France, 250,000 in Germany, 200,000 in Canada and 100,000 in the United Kingdom.

== Other adaptations ==
The Irish actor Richard Harris won a Grammy in 1973 for the Audiobook LP Jonathan Livingston Seagull. To date, Harris's reading has not been released on any other format. Versions read by the author, Richard Bach, have been released on LP, cassette, and CD.
