= Richard Bach =

American spiritual writer (born 1936)

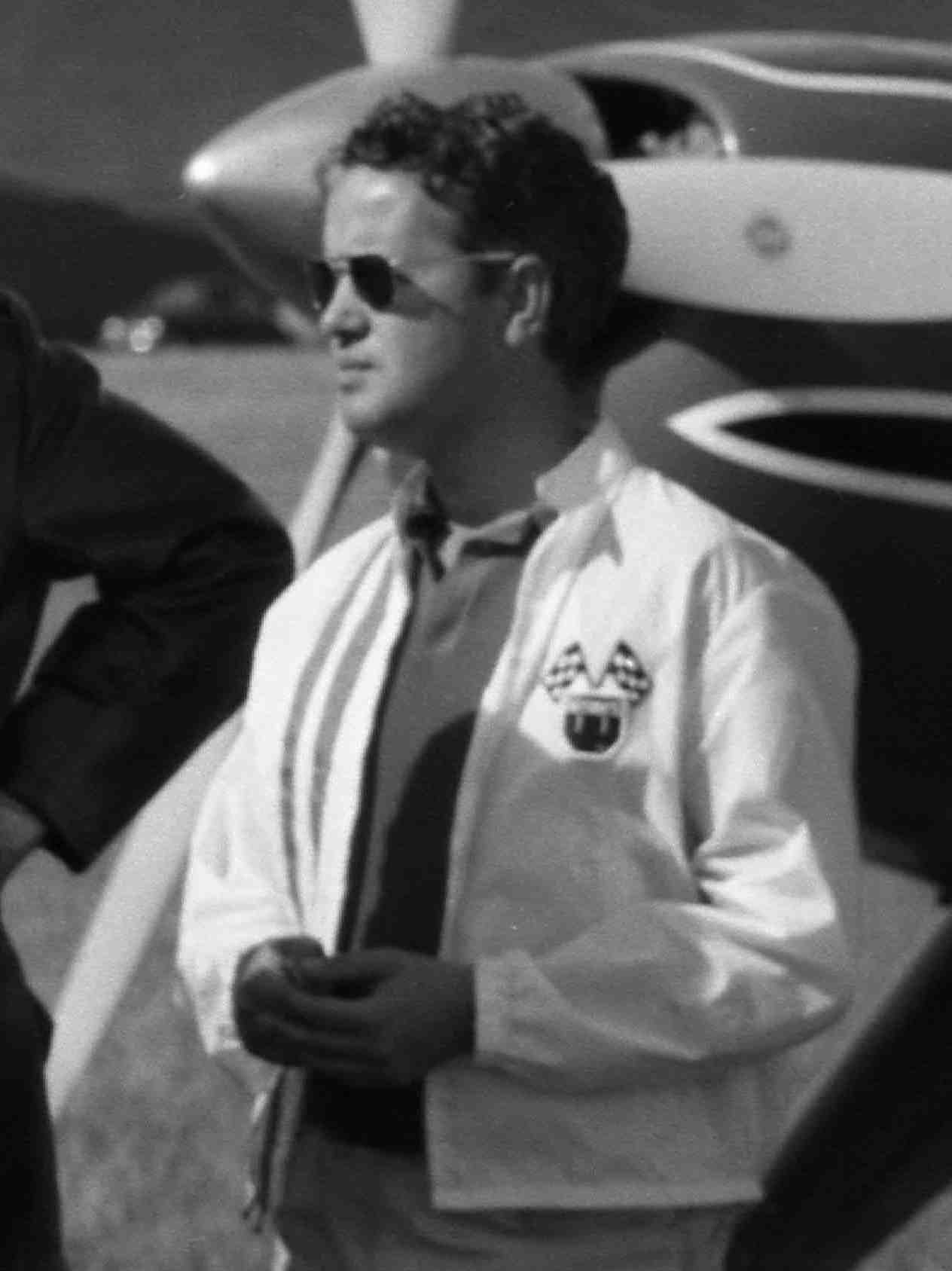
- Richard Bach, c. 1973
- Born: June 23, 1936 (age 90); Oak Park, Illinois. U.S.
- Education: California State University, Long Beach
- Occupation: Writer
- Spouses: Bette Jeanne Franks (m. 1957; div. 1970) Leslie Parrish (m. 1981; div. 1999) Sabryna Nelson-Alexopoulos (m. 1999; div. 2011) Melinda Jane Kellogg (m. 2020)
- Children: 6, including James Marcus Bach
- Writing career
- Years active: 1963–present
- Genres: Aviation, fantasy, philosophy
- Notable works: Jonathan Livingston Seagull; Illusions: The Adventures of a Reluctant Messiah
- Website: www.richardbach.com

Signature
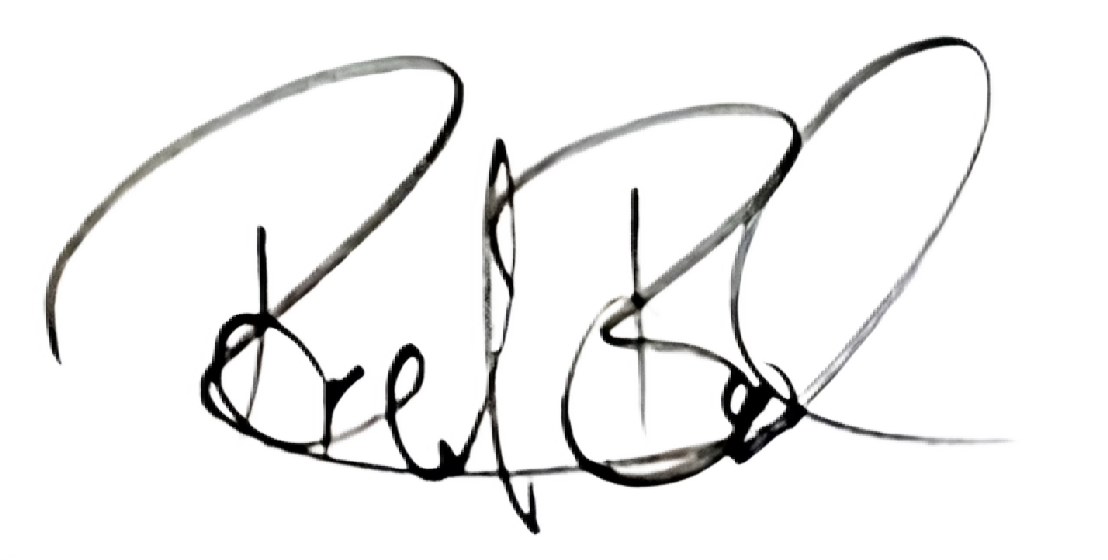

Richard David Bach (born June 23, 1936) is an American writer. He has written numerous flight-related works of fiction and non-fiction. His works include Jonathan Livingston Seagull (1970) and Illusions: The Adventures of a Reluctant Messiah (1977), both of which were among the 1970s' biggest sellers.

Most of Bach's books have been semi-autobiographical, using actual or fictionalized events from his life to illustrate his philosophy. His books espouse his philosophy that our apparent physical limits and mortality are merely appearance. Bach is noted for his love of aviation and his books related to flying in a metaphorical context. He has flown as a hobby since the age of 17. In late August 2012, Bach was severely injured when on approach to landing at Friday Harbor, Washington, his aircraft clipped some power lines and crashed upside down in a field.

== Early life ==
Bach was born in Oak Park, Illinois, to Roland R. and Ruth Shaw Bach. His father was an American Red Cross chapter manager. Bach graduated from California State University, Long Beach in 1955.

Bach's first airplane flight occurred at age 14, when his mother was campaigning for a seat on the council of Long Beach, California. Her campaign manager, Paul Marcus, mentioned that he flew airplanes and invited Richard on a flight in his Globe Swift.

== Aviation career ==
Bach served in the United States Navy Reserve, then in the New Jersey Air National Guard's 108th Fighter Wing, 141st Fighter Squadron (USAF), as a Republic F-84F Thunderstreak fighter pilot. He then worked at a variety of jobs, including as a technical writer for Douglas Aircraft and as a contributing editor for Flying magazine. He served in the USAF reserve and was deployed in France in 1960. He later became a barnstormer.

During the summer of 1970, Bach and his friend Chris Cagle traveled to Ireland, where they participated in flying sequences for Roger Corman's film Von Richthofen and Brown. They flew a variety of World War I aircraft of the Blue Max collection owned by ex-RCAF pilot Lynn Garrison. Bach and Garrison first met when Bach wrote articles for Avian, Garrison's aviation publication.

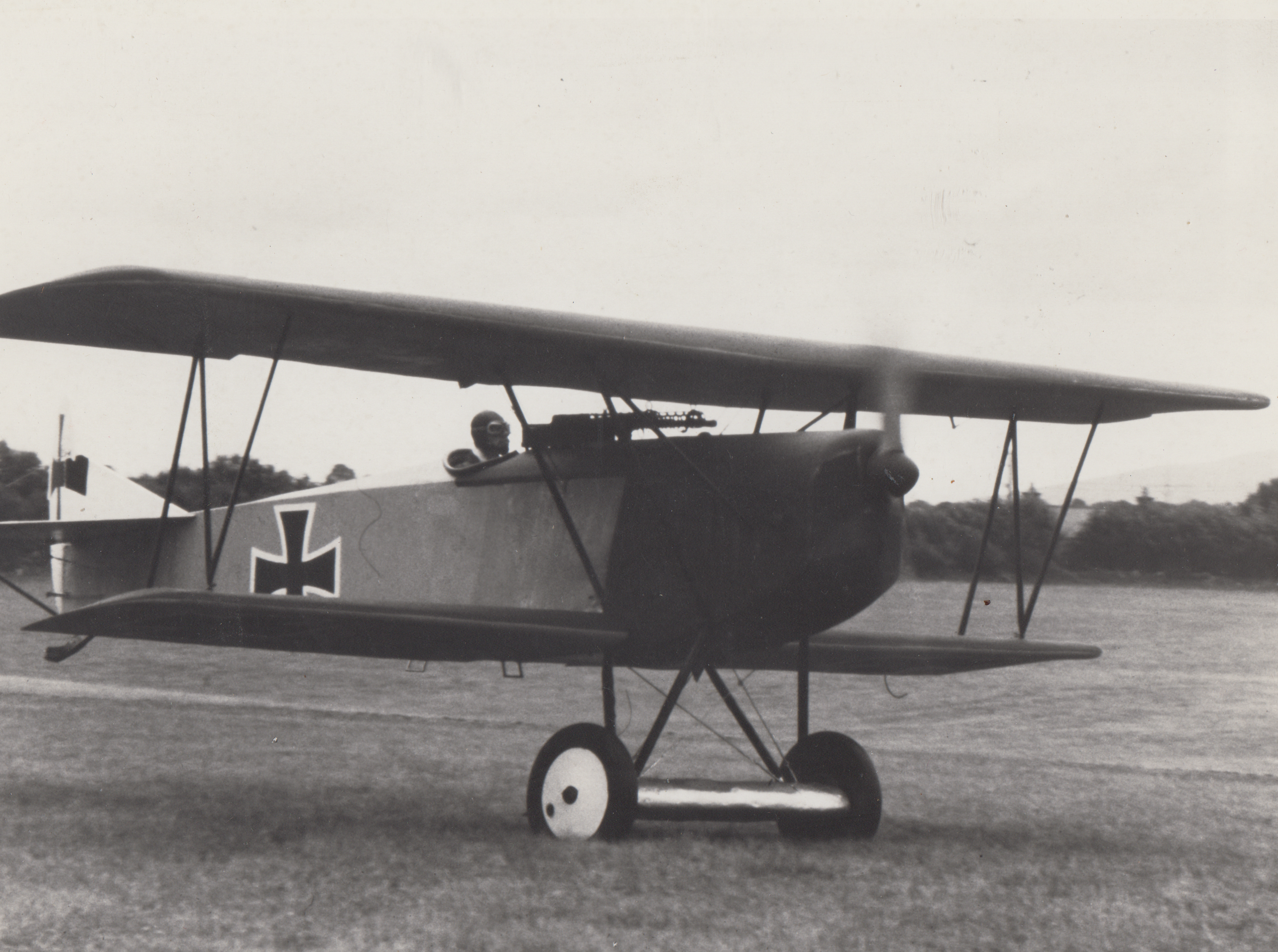
In 1970, Bach participated in Roger Corman's production Von Richthofen and Brown, in Ireland

Most of Bach's books involve flight in some way, from the early stories which are purely about flying aircraft, to Stranger to the Ground, his first book, to his later works, in which he used flight as a philosophical metaphor.

== Literary career ==
In 1963 Bach published his first book, Stranger to the Ground, which describes a mission flight he undertook from Wethersfield, England, to Chaumont, France. It was favorably received by Martin Caidin in The New York Times Book Review and by Edmund Fuller in The Wall Street Journal, and mixedly by Peter W. Brooks in The Journal of the Royal Aeronautical Society. By 1972 it had sold 17,000 copies, making it the best-selling of Bach's first three books.

Jonathan Livingston Seagull, 1970s story about a seagull who flew for the love and passion of flying rather than merely to catch food, was released by Macmillan Publishers after the manuscript was turned down by several others. It had first been serialized in Private Pilot magazine, as well as in Soaring, the magazine of the Soaring Society of America. The book, containing fewer than 10,000 words, and featuring photos of seagulls in flight by photographer Russell Munson, became a number-one bestseller, selling more than one million copies in 1972 alone. The surprising success of the book was widely reported in the media in the early 1970s.

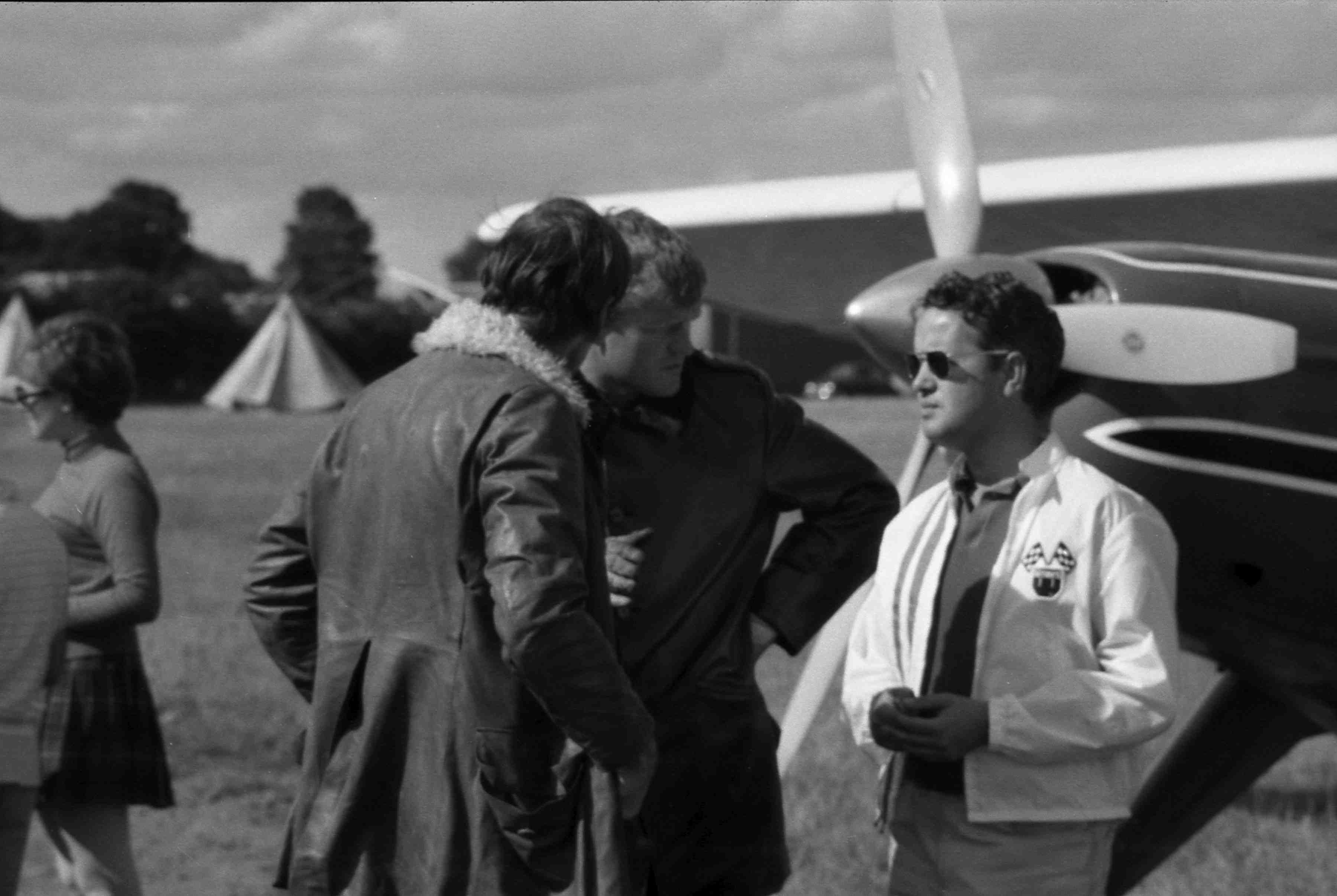
Bach (in leather coat) in front of Helio Courier G-ARMU used for Von Richthofen and Brown (1970)

In 1973, Jonathan Livingston Seagull was adapted into a film of the same name, produced by Paramount Pictures Corporation, with a soundtrack by Neil Diamond. Bach then filed a lawsuit against producer/director Hall Bartlett, alleging that Bartlett had destroyed Bach's screenplay for the film and that Bartlett had violated a clause in Bach's contract which stated that the film could not be released in theaters without Bach's approval. Associate producer Leslie Parrish was appointed to be a mediator between Bach and Bartlett, but the mediation failed. The lawsuit ended with the film being released in theaters with some changes made to the final cut, while Bach had his name removed from the film's screenwriting credits.

In 1975, Bach was the driving force behind Nothing by Chance, a documentary film based on his book of the same name. The film centers on modern barnstorming around the United States in the 1970s. Bach recruited a group of his friends who were pilots to recreate the era of the barnstormer.

The second novel, Illusions: The Adventures of a Reluctant Messiah, published in 1977, tells of an encounter with a modern-day messiah who has decided to quit.

On August 31, 2012, Bach was injured in an aircraft landing accident on San Juan Island in Washington. He was landing a 2008 Easton Gilbert G Searey (N346PE) that he had nicknamed Puff at a private airport when the landing gear clipped some power lines. He crashed upside down in a field about two miles from Friday Harbor, taking down two poles and sparking a small grass fire.

The day after the accident, Bach was reported to be in serious but stable condition with a head injury and broken shoulder. Bach was hospitalized for four months. He reported that his near-death experience inspired him to finish the fourth part of Jonathan Livingston Seagull, which had been originally published in three parts.

In December 2012, Publishers Weekly reported that Travels with Puff had been sent to his publisher the day before his accident. Travels with Puff was released on March 19, 2013.

In 2014, Bach published his sequel to Illusions: The Adventures of a Reluctant Messiah, which he called Illusions II: The Adventures of a Reluctant Student. The book incorporates the story of Bach's real-life aircraft crash, with the author imagining he is being visited by the "messiah", Don Shimoda, who helps him through his difficult medical recovery.

== Personal life ==
Bach had six children with his first wife, Bette Jeanne Franks. Also a pilot, she is the author of Patterns: Tales of Flying and of Life, a book about her life as a pilot and single mother. She typed and edited most of Richard's aviation writing. They divorced in 1970, and Bach spent years without seeing his children.

His and Bette's son Jonathan, named after the titular character in Bach's bestseller, Jonathan Livingston Seagull, is a software engineer and journalist. He wrote the 1993 book Above the Clouds, about growing up without knowing his father and then later meeting him as a college student. Richard gave his approval, although he noted that it included some personal history he would "rather not see in print."

Their other children are Robert, Kristel, James Marcus Bach, Erika, and their youngest daughter, Bethany, who died in an accident at the age of 15 in 1985.

In 1981, Bach married the actress Leslie Parrish, whom he had met during the making of the film Jonathan Livingston Seagull. She featured significantly in two of his subsequent books: The Bridge Across Forever and One, which primarily focused on their relationship and Bach's concept of soulmates. They divorced in 1999.

Bach married his third wife, Sabryna Nelson-Alexopoulos, in April 1999. They divorced on April 1, 2011.

Bach has been married to his fourth wife, Melinda Kellogg, since November, 2020.

== Bibliography ==
- Stranger to the Ground. Dell reprint 1990, First edition 1963. ISBN 0-440-20658-8.
- Biplane. Dell Reprint 1990, First edition 1966. ISBN 0-440-20657-X.
- Nothing by Chance. Dell Reprint 1990, First edition 1969. ISBN 0-440-20656-1.
- Jonathan Livingston Seagull (1970) Macmillan, ISBN 0-380-01286-3.
- A Gift of Wings. Dell Reissue 1989, First edition 1974. ISBN 0-440-20432-1.
- Illusions: The Adventures of a Reluctant Messiah. 1977. ISBN 0-385-28501-9.
- There's No Such Place As Far Away. Delta 1998, First edition 1979. ISBN 0-385-31927-4.
- The Bridge Across Forever: A Love Story. Dell Reissue 1989. First edition 1984. ISBN 0-440-10826-8.
- One. Dell Reissue 1989, First edition 1988. ISBN 0-440-20562-X.
- Running from Safety. Delta 1995. ISBN 0-385-31528-7.
- Out of My Mind. Delta 2000. ISBN 0-385-33490-7.
- The Ferret Chronicles (Five novellas):
  - Air Ferrets Aloft. Scribner 2002. ISBN 0-7432-2753-0.
  - Rescue Ferrets at Sea. Scribner 2002. ISBN 0-7432-2750-6.
  - Writer Ferrets: Chasing the Muse. Scribner 2002,. ISBN 0-7432-2754-9.
  - Rancher Ferrets on the Range. Scribner 2003. ISBN 0-7432-2755-7.
  - The Last War: Detective Ferrets and the Case of the Golden Deed. Scribner 2003. ISBN 0-7432-2756-5.
- Curious Lives: Adventures from the Ferret Chronicles. Hampton Roads Publishing Company 2005. ISBN 1-57174-457-6.

The book Curious Lives is in fact the above five Ferret Chronicles books collected in one volume, the only changes being changes to the titles of each of the five.

- Flying: The Aviation Trilogy. Scribner 2003, ISBN 0-7432-4747-7, Collected edition containing
  - Stranger to the Ground
  - Biplane
  - Nothing by Chance
- Messiah's Handbook: Reminders for the Advanced Soul. 2004. ISBN 1-57174-421-5.
- Hypnotizing Maria. Hampton Roads Publishing Company 2009, ISBN 1-57174-623-4.
- Thank Your Wicked Parents: Blessings from a Difficult Childhood. Rainbow Ridge 2012, ISBN 978-193790-702-0.
- Travels with Puff: A Gentle Game of Life and Death. NiceTiger 2013. ISBN 978-193777-703-6.
- Illusions II: The Adventures of a Reluctant Student. Diamond Inspiration (Kindle single e-book) 2014.
- Life With My Guardian Angel. Rainbow Ridge 2018. ISBN 978-1937907563.
