= Dinosaurus! =

1960 film by Irvin Yeaworth

- DVD cover (2002)
- Directed by: Irvin Yeaworth
- Written by: Dan E. Weisburd; Jean Yeaworth
- Produced by: Jack H. Harris
- Starring: Ward Ramsey; Paul Lukather; Kristina Hanson; Alan Roberts; Gregg Martell
- Cinematography: Stanley Cortez
- Edited by: John A. Bushelman
- Music by: Ronald Stein
- Production companies: Fairview Productions; Jack Harris Productions
- Distributed by: Universal International
- Release date: June 24, 1960 (New Orleans)
- Running time: 85 minutes
- Country: United States
- Language: English
- Budget: $400,000

Dinosaurus! is a 1960 science-fiction film directed by Irvin Yeaworth and produced by Jack H. Harris.

== Plot ==
The film is about an American engineering team led by Bart (Ward Ramsey) that is building a harbor on a Caribbean island, when they accidentally uncover two dinosaurs that have been frozen in suspended animation for millions of years. They are a Brontosaurus and a Tyrannosaurus rex. That night, during a storm, the beasts are struck by lightning and come back to life. The islanders have no idea that the dinosaurs are alive because of the storm and are now roaming the island. Also awakened is a caveman (Gregg Martell), who initially is unknown to the islanders, as he was buried some distance away. The T. rex hunts across the island, attacking a beach guard and trolley cart. The caveman, meanwhile, stumbles into and is bewildered by a modern house. There, he meets and befriends an island boy with a love of dinosaurs, Julio. The caveman introduces Julio to the Brontosaurus, to which he is friendly, and they go on a ride across the island.

The T. rex catches up to them and menaces Julio and the caveman, leading to it battling the Brontosaurus as the others hide in an abandoned mineshaft. After the T. rex seemingly kills the Brontosaurus by biting its neck, it notices the humans hiding in the mine and begins furiously kicking and clawing at it. The engineers briefly drive the T. rex back by lobbing a Molotov cocktail into its mouth. As Bart goes in to save Julio and the others, the caveman sacrifices himself by holding up a collapsing beam to keep the mineshaft from caving in entirely, allowing others to escape. The Brontosaurus, still alive, accidentally stumbles away and into a quicksand pit that swallows it up.

Meanwhile, the islanders have found refuge from the T. rex by hiding in the old fortress, which is protected by a ring of burning fuel. To ensure the T. rex does not get in, Bart drives out to face the beast in a mechanical digger. They duel on the edge of an island cliff, and after a tense fight, the T. rex is knocked into water, ending the island terror. The film ends with a picture of the apparently dead T. rex on the sea bed. In an ending similar to his previous films The Blob and 4D Man, the words "THE END" are shown, followed by a question mark.

== Production ==
Parts of the film were shot on location, some of which took place on the island of St. Croix, in the U.S. Virgin Islands. The dinosaurs were filmed using the technique of stop-motion animation, with puppets for close-ups.

During special-effects work on this picture, the crew used their Brontosaurus model and miniature jungle set to film a shot for an episode of TV's The Twilight Zone (1959) called "The Odyssey of Flight 33". A shot of the T. rex was also borrowed for "The Secret of Gilligan's Island", a third-season episode of Gilligan's Island in which Gilligan dreams the castaways are all cave dwellers living on the island in the Stone Age.

The roars and growls of the T. rex were used numerous times for creatures in The Outer Limits in episodes, such as "The Invisibles", and can also be heard from various other film monsters.

The toy dinosaurs Julio shows everyone at the cantina were Brontosaurus and T. rex plastic figures made by Marx Toys.

The leading role was intended for Steve McQueen, who had starred in The Blob two years earlier, also produced by Harris and directed by Yeaworth. McQueen passed on the film to make The Magnificent Seven, instead.

== Release ==
The film had its premiere on June 24, 1960, at the Joy Theater in New Orleans and then opened in Cincinnati, Ohio; Hartford, Connecticut; Providence, Rhode Island; Springfield and Worcester, Massachusetts; Cedar Rapids, Iowa; and Baton Rouge and Shreveport, Louisiana.

== Reception and legacy ==
Howard Thompson of The New York Times wrote, "If ever there was a tired, synthetic, plodding sample of movie junk, it's this 'epic' about two prehistoric animals hauled from an underwater deep-freeze by some island engineers."

The film was adapted into a comic book of the same name.

It was parodied by RiffTrax on August 28, 2014.

== See also ==
- List of films featuring dinosaurs
- List of stop motion films
- List of American films of 1960
