= Jack H. Harris =

American film producer and distributor (1918-2017)

- Born: Jack Henry Harris; November 28, 1918; Philadelphia, Pennsylvania, U.S.
- Died: March 14, 2017 (aged 98); Beverly Hills, California, U.S.
- Occupations: Film producer and distributor
- Years active: 1950s–1990s
- Children: 2, including Lynda Resnick
- Family: Stewart Resnick (son-in-law)

Jack Henry Harris (November 28, 1918 – March 14, 2017) was an American film producer and distributor. He produced The Blob (1958), 4D Man (1959), and Equinox (1970).

== Early life ==
Harris was born to a Jewish family in Philadelphia, the son of Sara and Benny Ostravsky. His mother was from Romania and his father from Poland; the latter changed the family surname to Harris.

== Career ==
=== Early career ===
Harris began his career in show business as a vaudeville performer in Gus Edwards' Kiddie Revue when he was six years old. He would later work in a theatre as an usher, in a publicity department, and in the distribution field, finally later taking up a career as a producer.

=== Film production ===
Harris is credited with coming up with the original motivation for his 1958 film, The Blob. Harris also worked on the TV series It's About Time and The Twilight Zone.

=== Distribution and retitling practices ===
As a distributor, Harris was known for acquiring independent films and retitling them with more commercial or exploitative names to enhance their marketability. One notable example was his acquisition of the 1973 Vietnam veteran drama Just Be There, which he retitled The Swinging Teacher and remarketed as an exploitation film despite its serious dramatic content.

== Later recognition ==
Harris was among the 22 people selected to be honored with a star on the Hollywood Walk of Fame in 2014, in the motion pictures category. 95 at the time of his unveiling ceremony held on February 4, 2014, he was the oldest person to be honored with a star on the Walk of Fame.

== Personal life ==
In 1988, he married Judith "Judy" Parker; they lived in Beverly Hills.

== Death ==
Harris died March 14, 2017, at his home in Beverly Hills at aged 98.

== Filmography ==
He was a producer in all films unless otherwise noted.

=== Film ===
Year	Film	Credit	Notes
1958	The Blob		
1959	4D Man		
1960	Dinosaurus!		
1965	Master of Horror	Executive producer	
1966	The Unkissed Bride		
1970	Equinox		
1972	Beware! The Blob	Executive producer	
1973	Schlock		
1974	Dark Star	Executive producer	
1978	Eyes of Laura Mars	Executive producer	
1986	Prison Ship		
1988	The Blob		
1991	Blobermouth		Final film as a producer

Miscellaneous crew

Year	Film	Role	Notes
1968	Without a Stitch	Presenter	
1973	The Swinging Teacher	Presenter	Originally titled Just Be There
1974	Dark Star	Presenter	
1976	Ape	Presenter	

As an actor

Year	Film	Role	Notes
1958	The Blob	Man Running Out of Theater	Uncredited
1959	4D Man	Man in Nightclub	Uncredited
1960	Dinosaurus!	Tourist on Boat	Uncredited
1970	Equinox	Detective Harrison	Uncredited
1972	Beware! The Blob	Man Running Across Ice	Uncredited
1973	Schlock	Man Reading Horror Comic	Uncredited
1978	Eyes of Laura Mars	Man in Gallery	Uncredited
1986	Prison Ship	Intercom Announcer	Voice role

As writer

Year	Film
1959	4D Man
1960	Dinosaurus!
1966	The Unkissed Bride
1972	Beware! The Blob

As director

Year	Film
1966	The Unkissed Bride

Thanks

Year	Film	Role
2009	Alien Trespass	Acknowledgment: The Blob footage courtesy of

=== Television ===
Year	Title
1960	Masterworks of Terror

Miscellaneous crew

Year	Title	Role	Notes
1959	Masterworks of Terror	Producer	US version
1961	The Twilight Zone	Dinosaur sequence	
1966	It's About Time	Special film material	
1974	The Horror Hall of Fame	Provider: Filmclips	Documentary

== Book ==
In 2015, Harris published his first book, Father of the Blob: The Making of a Monster Smash & Other Hollywood Tales (TVGuestpert Publishing).
