= The Blob (1988 film) =

1988 film by Chuck Russell

- Theatrical release poster
- Directed by: Chuck Russell
- Screenplay by: Chuck Russell; Frank Darabont
- Based on: The Blob (1958 film) by: Theodore Simonson; Kate Phillips; Irving H. Millgate
- Produced by: Jack H. Harris; Elliott Kastner
- Starring: Kevin Dillon; Shawnee Smith; Donovan Leitch; Jeffrey DeMunn; Candy Clark; Joe Seneca
- Cinematography: Mark Irwin
- Edited by: Tod Feuerman; Terry Stokes
- Music by: Michael Hoenig
- Production company: Palisades California Inc.
- Distributed by: Tri-Star Pictures
- Release date: August 5, 1988 (U.S.)
- Running time: 95 minutes
- Country: United States
- Language: English
- Budget: $10 million (Note: Director Chuck Russell stated in a commentary that the budget of the movie was $10 million or less.)
- Box office: $8.2 million

The Blob is a 1988 American science fiction horror film directed by Chuck Russell, who co-wrote it with Frank Darabont. It is a remake of the 1958 film of the same name. The film stars Kevin Dillon, Shawnee Smith, Donovan Leitch, Jeffrey DeMunn, Paul McCrane, Art LaFleur, Robert Axelrod, Joe Seneca, Del Close and Candy Clark. The plot follows an acidic, amoeba-like organism that crashes down to Earth in a military satellite, devouring and dissolving anything in its path as it grows.

Filmed in Abbeville, Louisiana, The Blob was theatrically released in August 1988 by Tri-Star Pictures to generally positive reviews but was a box office failure, grossing $8.2 million against its budget of approximately $10 million. Despite being a box office failure, The Blob has garnered a cult following and praise for being a remake that surpasses the original. It was released on home video by Sony Pictures Home Entertainment and Shout! Studios through its "Scream Factory" label.

== Plot ==
A meteorite crashes near Arborville, California. An elderly vagabond discovers within a sphere a massive slime mold-like substance that adheres to his hand. Three high school students—football star Paul, cheerleader Meg, and outsider Brian—take him to a hospital. After Brian leaves, Paul witnesses the lower half of the rescued man melting from exposure to the Blob. As he calls for help, the Blob drops on top of him. Meg returns to find Paul being consumed by the growing Blob. It fully dissolves him and seeps out of the hospital.

After Brian and Meg have unsatisfactory encounters with the police, they meet at a diner where Meg tells Brian about the Blob. Brian's disbelief shatters when the diner's handyman George is fatally pulled into the sink's drain. The growing creature pursues them to the diner's walk-in freezer but retreats upon entering. After consuming the diner's owner, as well as Sheriff Geller, the Blob reenters the sewers. Meg and Brian return to the police station, where the dispatcher tells them that Deputy Briggs is near the meteor landing site. They discover a military operation led by scientist Dr. Meddows, who orders the town and the two teens quarantined. As Brian escapes, Meg is taken to town, where she learns that her younger brother Kevin snuck into the movie theater with his friend Eddie. The Blob enters the theater, killing several staff and audience members. Meg rescues Eddie and Kevin as audience members flee the theater.

Brian learns that the Blob is a biological warfare experiment created during the Cold War. It became so dangerous to handle that it was launched into space in a satellite. It instead continued to feed off of bacteria mutated by space radiation, growing big enough to crash the satellite back to Earth. Brian evades government personnel by riding his motorcycle into the sewers. Meg and Kevin flee from the Blob, but Eddie is consumed. Kevin escapes by scaling a pipe to the surface. The Blob is distracted by government agents searching the sewers as Meg meets back up with Brian. Meddows orders the sewers quarantined, however Brian uses a surviving agent's grenade launcher to blow open a manhole and publicly confront Meddows. The community begins to turn on Meddows, however he claims Brian is infected and dangerous. He attempts to execute Brian himself, only to be dragged into the sewers by the Blob. The military attempts to blow it up with grenades and other explosives, but only succeed in enraging the creature; it bursts from the sewers and feasts on the population. Reverend Meeker proclaims the scene to be the prophesied end of the world, after a failed flamethrower attack sets him ablaze. Meg saves him with a fire extinguisher inadvertently hitting the Blob with the extinguisher gas. When the creature recoils, she realizes that it cannot tolerate cold.

The survivors retreat to the town hall and hold the Blob off with furniture-barricades and fire extinguishers, but it is a losing battle; it engulfs half the building and devours Briggs. Brian goes to the town's garage and gets a snowmaking truck that has canisters of liquid nitrogen attached. As the Blob is about to consume Meg and her family, Brian shoots snow at it. Angered, the Blob turns its attention toward him and knocks the truck over in retaliation, trapping Brian. Meg lures the Blob away from Brian toward the canisters she has rigged with an explosive charge taken from a dying soldier. The Blob is about to overrun both Brian and Meg when the charge goes off, blowing up the canisters and covering the Blob in liquid nitrogen, flash-freezing it. Moss Woodley stores the Blob's crystallized remains in the town icehouse.

Sometime later, at a tent revival church service in a field, Meeker, disfigured by his burns and driven insane, preaches a doomsday sermon. After the service in his private quarters, one of his congregation asks when the day of reckoning will come. Meeker simply replies, "Soon." He then secretly holds up a glass jar containing a still living and trapped piece of the Blob, cryptically saying "The Lord will give me a sign."

== Cast ==
- Kevin Dillon as Brian Flagg
- Shawnee Smith as Meg Penny
- Donovan Leitch as Paul Taylor
- Jeffrey DeMunn as Sheriff Herb Geller
- Candy Clark as Fran Hewitt
- Joe Seneca as Dr. Christopher Meddows
- Del Close as Reverend Meeker
- Sharon Spelman as Mrs. Penny, Meg's mother.
- Beau Billingslea as Moss Woodley
- Art LaFleur as Tom Penny, a pharmacist, and Meg's father.
- Ricky Paull Goldin as Scott Jeskey
- Paul McCrane as Deputy Bill Briggs
- Michael Kenworthy as Kevin Penny, Meg's brother.
- Douglas Emerson as Eddie Beckner
- Robert Axelrod as Jennings
- Bill Moseley as a soldier in the sewer
- Erika Eleniak as Vicki DeSoto
- Jack Rader as Colonel Templeton Hargis
- Jack Nance as a doctor
- Billy Beck as the Can Man

== Analysis ==
The film functions as a conspiracy theory film. The threat of the original film (and its sequel, Beware! The Blob), was an alien entity from outer space. The remake starts this way but differs in revealing the threat is a biological weapon, created by a secret government agency. The Blob is closely followed by soldiers and scientists in protective suits. The change reflects the mentality of a more cynical era. The sinister government agents are opposed by rebellious teenager Brian Flagg (Kevin Dillon). His depiction as a rebel and a "tough guy punk" includes wearing a leather jacket, sporting long hair, riding a motorcycle, and distrusting authority figures. Del Close, who portrays Reverend Meeker, played an eyepatch wearing hobo in the 1972 sequel, Beware! The Blob.

== Production ==
Screenwriter Frank Darabont first met director Chuck Russell in 1981, when he worked as a production assistant on the film Hell Night. Before working together on The Blob, the two also collaborated on the script for A Nightmare on Elm Street 3: Dream Warriors. In 1986, New World Pictures purchased the rights to make a remake of The Blob featuring the original film's producer Jack H. Harris as executive producer. A year later, the production switched studios to Cinema Group Pictures.

Actor Del Close had been scheduled to direct a "mock opera" about Ronald Reagan at New York's Lincoln Center during the filming of The Blob; however, the production was canceled and he was unexpectedly available to audition for The Blob. Close had previously appeared in Beware! The Blob, the 1972 sequel to the original Blob. Production began on January 11, 1988, with the cast and crew of approximately 150 staying at a Travelodge in Abbeville, Louisiana. Due to the large amount of night shooting, the cast often slept during the day. On their off days, they watched videos at the hotel and ate crawfish, a popular item of local cuisine.

Special effects in the film were handled by Tony Gardner. Gardner was originally supposed to provide only a few small effects, with special effects artist Lyle Conway originally being in charge of the effects. However, after personnel changes he ended up running a crew of 33, including artist Chet Zar and mechanical effects designer Bill Sturgeon. In creating the titular Blob creature, the special effects team used silk bags filled with methyl cellulose, a thickening agent for food, creating what the team described as a "Blob Quilt". For the movie theater scene with a strobe light effect, stop motion was used. For the few minutes of screen time, near the end of the film, where Reverend Meeker has a scene with fresh burns and another with healed burns, actor Del Close required five-and-a-half hours of makeup preparation for fresh burns, and seven-and-a-half hours for healed burns.

== Release ==
In 1987, the film's rights were acquired by Cinema Group Pictures (later Palisades Entertainment) for a Memorial Day 1988 release, before the original distributor went bankrupt, and Tri-Star Pictures acquired the film's distribution rights. To promote the film, a novelization by David Bischoff was published on July 1, 1988 by Dell Publishing.

The Blob opened in New York City and Los Angeles, California on August 5, 1988.

=== Home media ===
The film was released on VHS on January 5, 1989, by RCA/Columbia Pictures Home Video. It was released on DVD in the United States by Sony Pictures Home Entertainment on September 11, 2001. Sony again released The Blob in September 2013 as part of its "The 4-Movie Horror Unleashed Collection", along with Fright Night, Christine and The Seventh Sign. The film was first released on Blu-ray in the United States by Twilight Time on October 14, 2014. On October 29, 2019, Shout! Studios' "Scream Factory" imprint issued a "Collector's Edition" of the film on Blu-ray, with a multitude of new bonus features. On October 17, 2023, Scream Factory released a 4K Ultra HD Blu-ray of the film with all the content from the previous 2019 Blu-ray.

== Reception ==
=== Box office ===
It grossed $8,247,943 at the box office. An article in the May 27, 1989 Screen International reported that the film's domestic box-office gross was "disastrous."

=== Critical response ===
On Rotten Tomatoes, a review aggregator, The Blob holds a 71% approval rating based on 31 critic reviews and an average rating of 5.9/10. The consensus reads: "The Blob can't replicate the B-movie charms of the original, though its fast pace and gory thrills pack enough of a punch to make it a worthwhile update."

Film critic and historian Leonard Maltin gave the film two out of a possible four stars, describing it as a, "Needless, if undeniably gooey, remake about a man-made what's-it that wipes out the standard number of vagrants and oversexed teenagers on its way to enveloping a small town." Janet Maslin of The New York Times wrote that the film "is more violent than the original, more spectacular, more cynical, more patently commercial and more attentive to detail" but said that "for reasons having nothing to do with merit, the 1958 film earned a place in history. The remake, enterprising as it is, won't do the same".

Retrospective reviews have typically been more favorable. Chuck Bowen of Slant Magazine wrote that the film "improves on the original cult classic with inventive, gracefully repulsive special effects and an agreeable post-Watergate anti-authoritarian message". HorrorNews.net gave the film a score of "4 1/2 out of 5", writing that "the twists that this film takes that differ from the original make it all the more terrifying and oddly enough... plausible". TV Guide gave the film 3/5 stars, calling it "a fine, multilayered effort from a director who understands the genre and appreciates its traditions". According to David Albaugh, Ezra James of MovieWeb, Carlo Giovannetti of Leonard Maltin's Movie Crazy, and Gregory Watson of Ravenous Monster, although the film did not perform well at the box office, it garnered a cult following and praised its ability to surpass the original film.

Discussing the poor critical and commercial performance of the film in an interview with Starlog, director Chuck Russell stated, "Maybe it was a mistake to do a remake of The Blob with a sense of humor. I thought that would be an entertaining interpretation. … Unfortunately, it was released late in a very hectic summer filled with big films and it didn't have a particularly good ad campaign."

== Bibliography ==
- Donovan, Barna William (2011), "Aliens, Rugged Individualists, and Incompetent Conspirators: Conspiracy Films of the 1980s", Conspiracy Films: A Tour of Dark Places in the American Conscious, McFarland & Company, ISBN 978-0-7864-8615-1
- Foertsch, Jacqueline (2001), "Two Takes on a Scare: Cinematic Plague Texts and their Remakes", Enemies Within: The Cold War and the AIDS Crisis in Literature, Film, and Culture, University of Illinois Press, ISBN 978-0-252-02637-9
- O'Neill, William L. (2007), "The "Good" War: National Security and American Culture", in Bacevich, Andrew J. (ed.), The Long War: A New History of U.S. National Security Policy Since World War II, Columbia University Press, ISBN 978-0-231-50586-4
