= Royersford, Pennsylvania =

Borough in Pennsylvania, US

- Borough
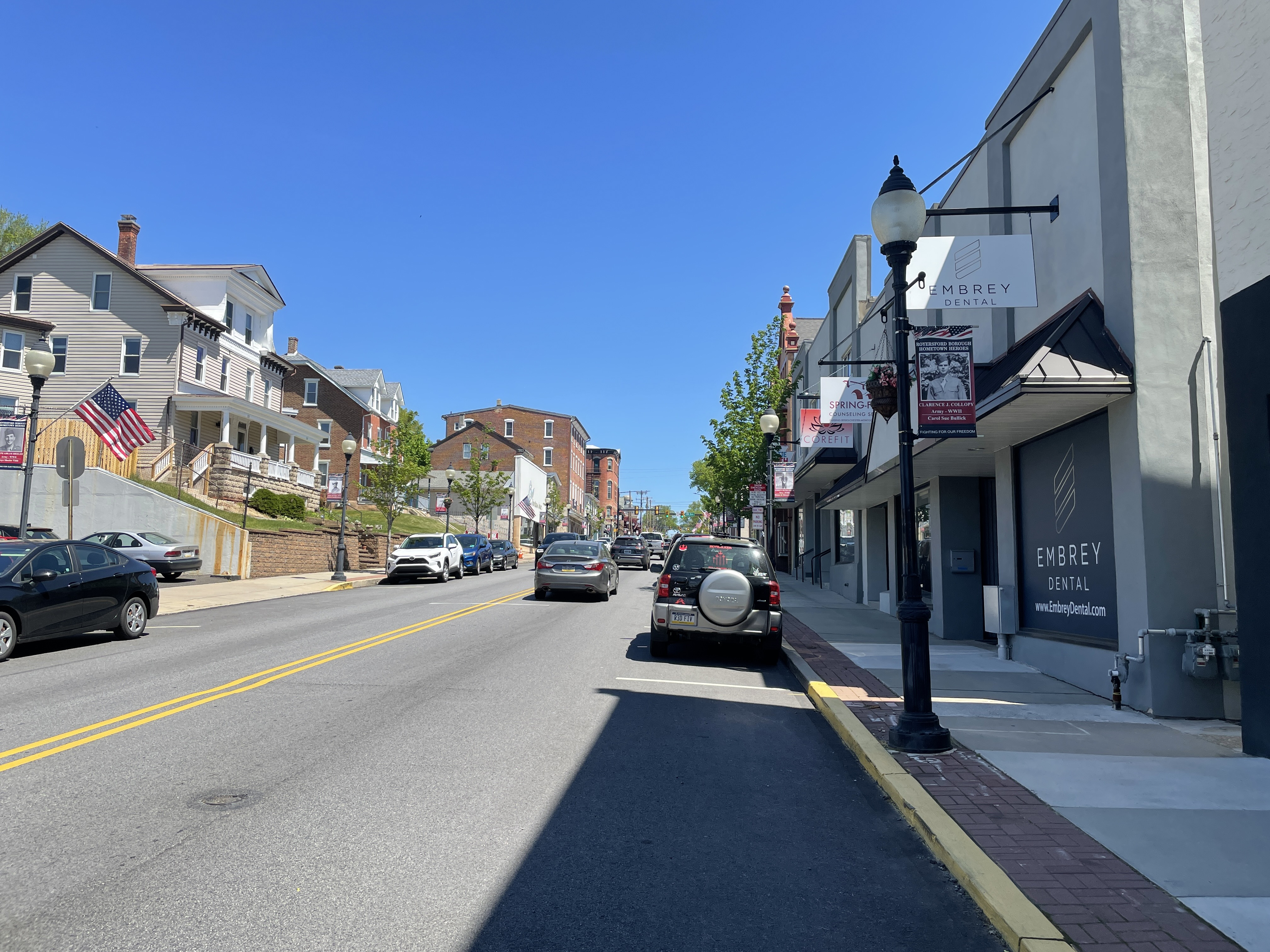
- Main Street in Royersford

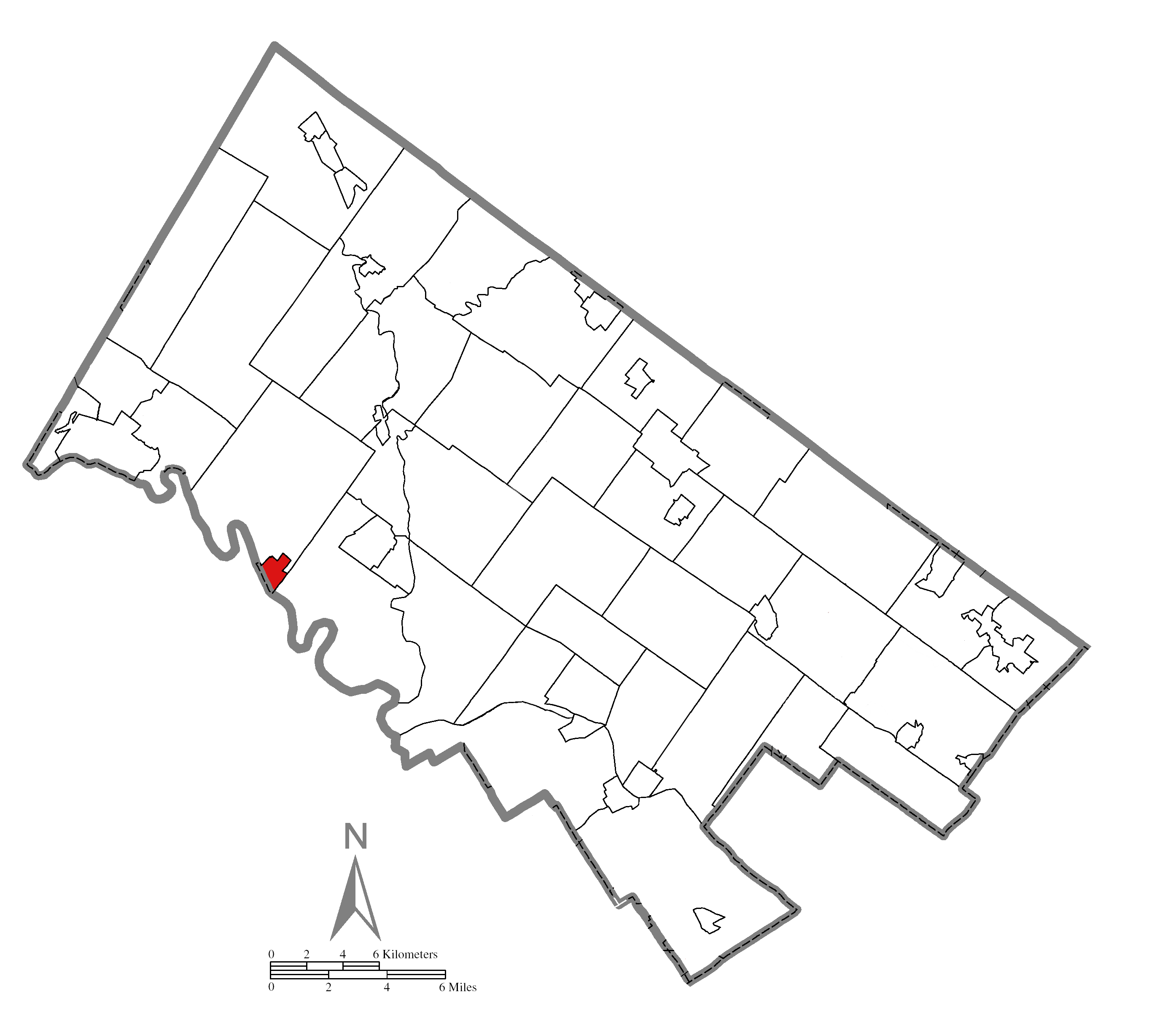
- Location of Royersford in Montgomery County, Pennsylvania.

- Location of Royersford in Pennsylvania Royersford (the United States)
- Coordinates: 40°11′07″N 75°32′16″W
- Country: United States
- State: Pennsylvania
- County: Montgomery
- Incorporated: 1879
- Founder: Benjamin Ferrari
- Seat: Borough Hall

Government
  - Type: Council-Manager
  - Mayor: Alex Metricarti

Area
  - Total: 0.82 sq mi (2.13 km^{2})
  - Land: 0.79 sq mi (2.04 km^{2})
  - Water: 0.035 sq mi (0.09 km^{2})
- Elevation: 239 ft (73 m)

Population (2020)
  - Total: 4,940
  - Density: 6,253.16/sq mi (2,414.36/km^{2})
- Time zone: UTC-5 (EST)
  - Summer (DST): UTC-4 (EDT)
- ZIP Code: 19468
- Area codes: 610 and 484
- FIPS code: 42-66576
- Website: www.royersfordborough.org

Royersford is a borough in Montgomery County, Pennsylvania, United States, 32 miles (51 km) northwest of Philadelphia, on the Schuylkill River. As of the 2020 census, Royersford had a population of 4,940.

== History ==
The town drew its name from the location of a ford across the Schuylkill River, which happened to be adjacent to land owned by the Royer family. Early in the twentieth century, it had several stove factories, two glass and bottle works, hosiery and silk mills, a dye and bleaching plant, manufactories of bricks, gas meters, stockings, shirts, shafting parts, wagons, agricultural implements, etc. The population stood at 2,607 people in 1900, and at 3,073 in 1910. The population was 4,940 at the 2020 census. The borough was formed from the southeastern corner of Limerick Township in 1879. Royersford is served by the Spring-Ford Area School District.

The Continental Stove Works was added to the National Register of Historic Places in 1986.

== Geography ==
Royersford is located at 40°11′7″N 75°32′16″W (40.185239, -75.537648). The borough lies on the northern banks of the Schuylkill River, and is considered a suburb of Philadelphia.

According to the United States Census Bureau, the borough has a total area of 0.8 square miles (2.1 km^{2}), of which 0.8 square miles (2.1 km^{2}) is land and 0.04 square miles (0.10 km^{2}) (4.88%) is water.

== Transportation ==
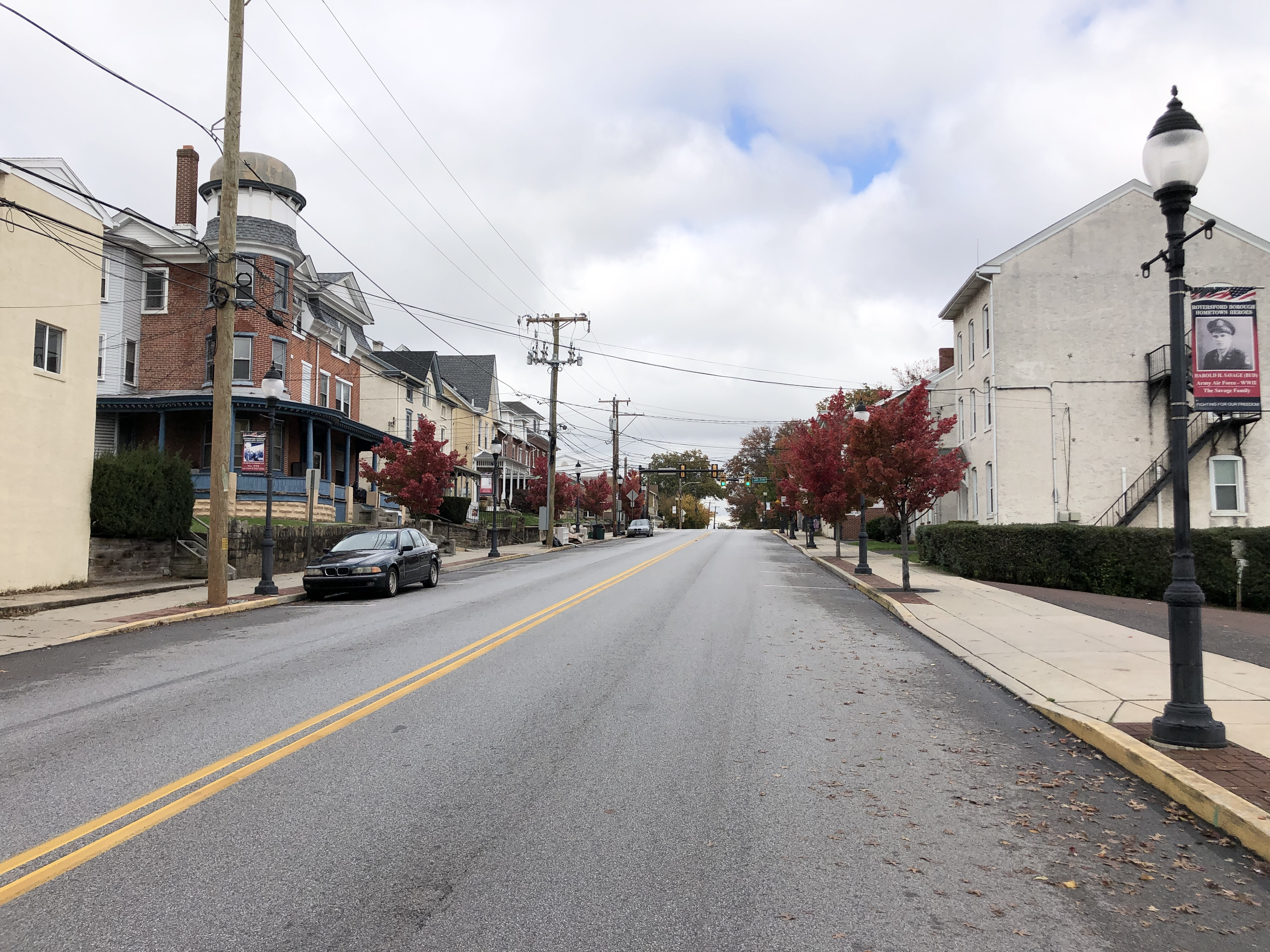
Main Street in Royersford

As of 2019 there were 12.99 miles (20.91 km) of public roads in Royersford, of which 1.79 miles (2.88 km) were maintained by the Pennsylvania Department of Transportation (PennDOT) and 11.20 miles (18.02 km) were maintained by the borough.

No numbered highways traverse the borough directly. Main streets through the town include Main Street, Lewis Road and Second Avenue. The nearest major highway is U.S. Route 422.

SEPTA provides Suburban Bus service to Royersford along Route 139, which runs between the King of Prussia Transit Center at the King of Prussia Mall and Limerick.

== Demographics ==
Historical population
| Census | Pop. | Note | %± |
|---|---|---|---|
| 1880 | 558 | | — |
| 1890 | 1,815 | | 225.3% |
| 1900 | 2,607 | | 43.6% |
| 1910 | 3,073 | | 17.9% |
| 1920 | 3,278 | | 6.7% |
| 1930 | 3,719 | | 13.5% |
| 1940 | 3,605 | | −3.1% |
| 1950 | 3,862 | | 7.1% |
| 1960 | 3,969 | | 2.8% |
| 1970 | 4,235 | | 6.7% |
| 1980 | 4,243 | | 0.2% |
| 1990 | 4,458 | | 5.1% |
| 2000 | 4,246 | | −4.8% |
| 2010 | 4,752 | | 11.9% |
| 2020 | 4,940 | | 4.0% |

=== 2020 census ===
As of the 2020 census, Royersford had a population of 4,940. The median age was 36.9 years. 20.0% of residents were under the age of 18 and 14.5% of residents were 65 years of age or older. For every 100 females there were 96.9 males, and for every 100 females age 18 and over there were 95.3 males age 18 and over.

100.0% of residents lived in urban areas, while 0.0% lived in rural areas.

There were 2,277 households in Royersford, of which 25.2% had children under the age of 18 living in them. Of all households, 33.6% were married-couple households, 24.5% were households with a male householder and no spouse or partner present, and 32.5% were households with a female householder and no spouse or partner present. About 38.6% of all households were made up of individuals and 11.2% had someone living alone who was 65 years of age or older.

There were 2,490 housing units, of which 8.6% were vacant. The homeowner vacancy rate was 1.4% and the rental vacancy rate was 6.1%.

Racial composition as of the 2020 census
| Race | Number | Percent |
|---|---|---|
| White | 3,955 | 80.1% |
| Black or African American | 363 | 7.3% |
| American Indian and Alaska Native | 14 | 0.3% |
| Asian | 90 | 1.8% |
| Native Hawaiian and Other Pacific Islander | 1 | 0.0% |
| Some other race | 105 | 2.1% |
| Two or more races | 412 | 8.3% |
| Hispanic or Latino (of any race) | 289 | 5.9% |

=== 2010 census ===
As of the 2010 census, the borough was 89.7% White, 5.1% Black or African American, 0.2% Native American, 1.7% Asian, and 2.4% were two or more races. 4.2% of the population were of Hispanic or Latino ancestry .

=== 2000 census ===
As of the census of 2000, there were 4,246 people, 1,928 households, and 1,066 families residing in the borough. The population density was 5,400.8 inhabitants per square mile (2,085.3/km^{2}). There were 2,039 housing units at an average density of 2,593.5 per square mile (1,001.4/km^{2}). The racial makeup of the borough was 95.97% White, 1.95% African American, 0.24% Native American, 0.64% Asian, 0.28% from other races, and 0.92% from two or more races. Hispanic or Latino of any race were 1.18% of the population.

There were 1,928 households, out of which 26.1% had children under the age of 18 living with them, 41.1% were married couples living together, 10.9% had a female householder with no husband present, and 44.7% were non-families. 38.8% of all households were made up of individuals, and 14.4% had someone living alone who was 65 years of age or older. The average household size was 2.20 and the average family size was 2.96.

In the borough the population was spread out, with 22.8% under the age of 18, 8.3% from 18 to 24, 32.5% from 25 to 44, 21.3% from 45 to 64, and 15.1% who were 65 years of age or older. The median age was 38 years. For every 100 females, there were 93.2 males. For every 100 females age 18 and over, there were 87.4 males.

The median income for a household in the borough was $39,442, and the median income for a family was $55,579. Males had a median income of $36,189 versus $28,689 for females. The per capita income for the borough was $21,314. None of the families and 2.7% of the population were living below the poverty line, including no under eighteens and 6.1% of those over 64.

== Politics and government ==
Presidential elections results
| Year | Republican | Democratic |
|---|---|---|
| 2020 | 40.1% 1,029 | 58.1% 1,492 |
| 2016 | 43.0% 953 | 51.1% 1,133 |
| 2012 | 39.8% 793 | 58.0% 1,157 |
| 2008 | 37.6% 722 | 61.4% 1,181 |
| 2004 | 46.7% 806 | 52.9% 914 |
| 2000 | 49.6% 703 | 47.4% 672 |

Royersford has a city manager form of government with a mayor and a seven-member borough council. The mayor is Alex Metricarti. Royersford was named for the Royer brothers, Benjamin and David, who owned and operated a ford across the Schuylkill River between Spring City and Royersford.

The borough is part of the Fourth Congressional District (represented by Rep. Madeleine Dean), the 146th State House District (represented by Rep. Joe Ciresi) and the 44th State Senate District (represented by Sen. Katie Muth).

== Education ==
Spring-Ford Area School District operates public schools.

The area Catholic school is Holy Cross Regional Catholic School in Collegeville. Holy Cross was formed in 2012 by the merger of Sacred Heart in Royersford and St. Eleanor in Collegeville.

== Entertainment ==
Parts of the classic 1958 horror film The Blob, starring Steve McQueen, were filmed in Royersford.

The film The Lovely Bones, starring Mark Wahlberg, directed by Peter Jackson, was filmed in the borough in late November 2007.

The Bloodhound Gang's most famous album, Hooray for Boobies, was recorded at Dome Studios on Main Street.

A scene in M. Night Shyamalan's 2015 film The Visit was filmed at the intersection of Washington Street and South 7th Avenue. A local middle school, the Spring-Ford Eighth Grade Center, was used as the backdrop.

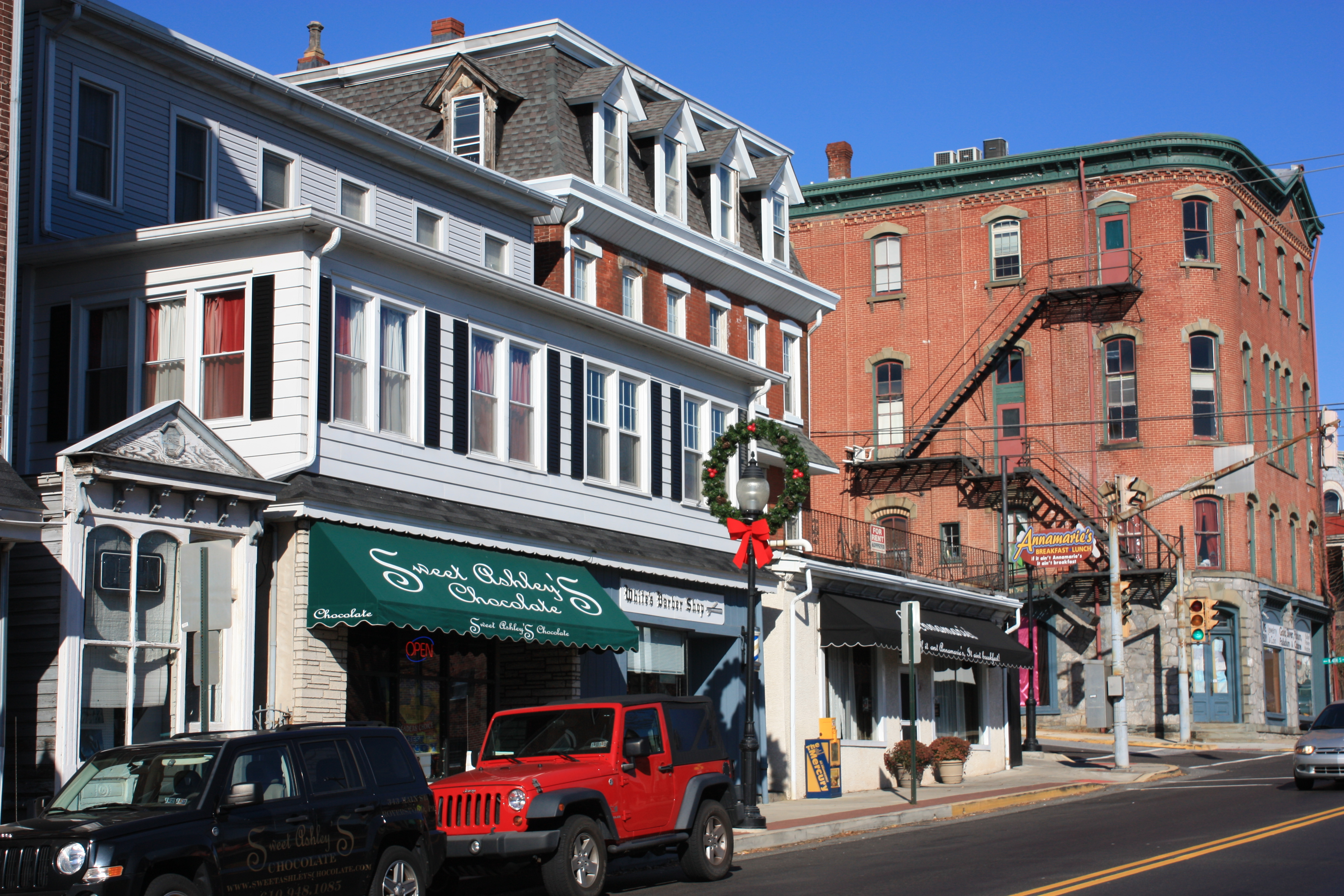
Main Street

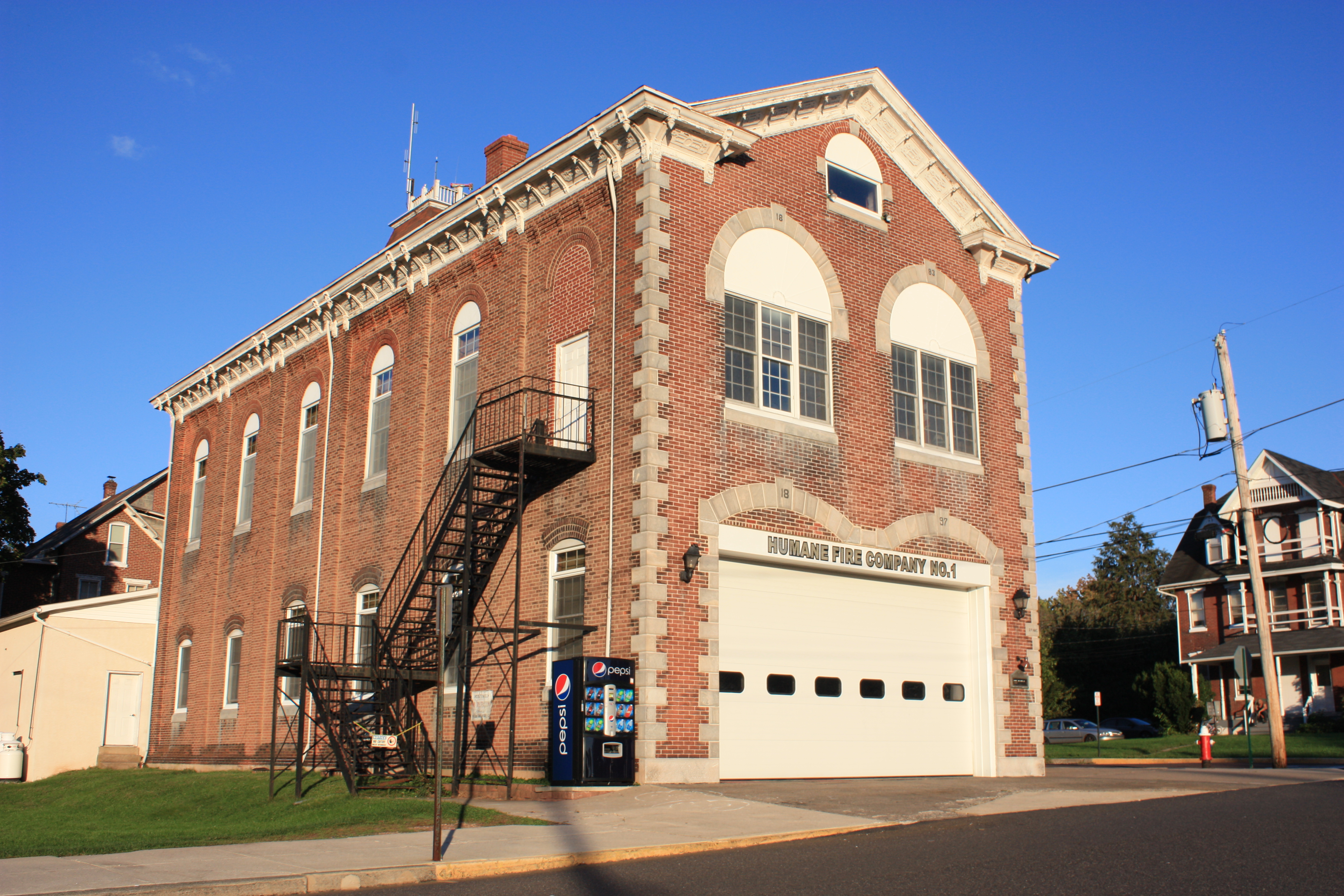
Humane Fire Company

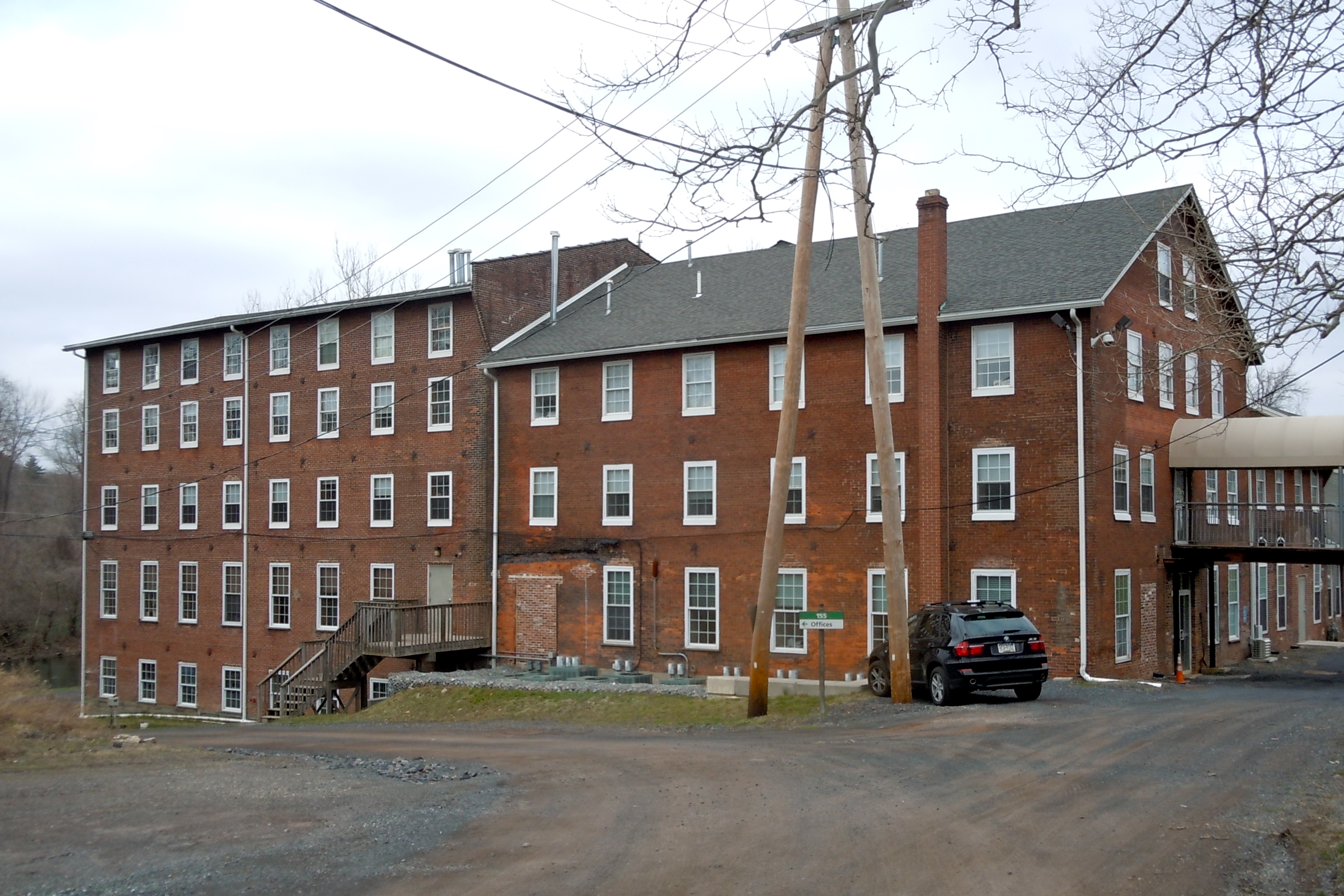
Continental Stove Works

== Notable people ==
- Christine Ramsey, distance runner
- Bob Shoudt, aka Notorious B.O.B., competitive eater and YouTuber'
- Joey Graziadei, American television personality
