= Irvin Yeaworth =

German-born American film director (1926–2004)

- Born: Irvin Shortess Yeaworth Jr. February 14, 1926; Berlin, Germany
- Died: July 19, 2004 (aged 78); Amman, Jordan
- Occupation: Film director
- Spouse: Jean Yeaworth

Irvin Shortess "Shorty" Yeaworth Jr. (February 14, 1926 – July 19, 2004) was a German-born American film director, producer, screenwriter and theme park builder.

== Biography ==
Born in Berlin and raised in Pennsylvania, Yeaworth began his career singing at age 10 at KDKA in Pittsburgh. As an adult, he eventually became a radio producer.

Throughout his life, Yeaworth directed more than 400 films for motivational, educational, and religious purposes, including television specials for evangelist Billy Graham. As an impresario, he directed the Wayne (Pennsylvania) Concert Series from 1979 to 2003.

Yeaworth is best known for directing the 1958 horror film The Blob, which depicts a growing, devouring alien slime. Yeaworth also mentored Christian filmmaker Russell Doughten, the film's associate producer.

In the 1970s, Yeaworth began leading American Christians on tours of Israel and Jordan, which he continued to do until his death. While in these countries, he designed and produced World's Fair and theme park pavilions for local enterprises. Towards the end of his life, he was working on construction for a theme park called the Jordan Experience, at the Aqaba Gateway in Aqaba, Jordan.

== Personal life ==
He married Jean Yeaworth in 1945, and they had five children together. Jean worked on most of his films as music supervisor or writer, including The Blob. They remained married until Yeaworth's death in 2004; Jean died in 2019.

== Death ==
On July 30, 2004, Yeaworth was killed in a single-car accident in Amman. According to his wife, he supposedly fell asleep at the wheel while driving. He was 78 years old.

== Legacy ==
In 2007, The Colonial Theatre in Phoenixville, Pennsylvania - a filming location in The Blob - honored Irvin Yeaworth and The Blob by holding a film contest in which amateur film-makers competed for the "Shorty" award, named after Yeaworth's nickname.

== Filmography ==
=== Director ===
- The Flaming Teen-Age (1956) (also writer and producer)
- The Blob (1958)
- 4D Man (1959) (also producer)
- Dinosaurus! (1960) (also producer)
- Way Out (1967) (also producer)
- The Gospel Blimp (1967) (also producer)
