= The Unkissed Bride =

1966 film by Jack H. Harris

- Film poster
- Directed by: Jack H. Harris
- Written by: Jack H. Harris
- Produced by: Jack H. Harris
- Starring: Tommy Kirk; Jacques Bergerac; Anne Helm; Danica d'Hondt; Robert Ball; Henny Youngman; Joe Pyne; Barbara McNair
- Cinematography: Vilis Lapenieks
- Edited by: Hank Gotzenberg
- Music by: Gene Kauer; Douglas M. Lackey
- Production company: Tonylyn Productions
- Distributed by: U.S. Films
- Release date: October 12, 1966
- Running time: 82 minutes
- Country: United States
- Language: English

The Unkissed Bride, also known as Mother Goose-A-Go-Go, is a 1966 American comedy film directed by Jack H. Harris and starring Tommy Kirk.

== Plot ==
Newlyweds Ted (Kirk) and Margie Hastings (Helm) go on honeymoon at the hotel of Margie's uncle, Jacques Phillipe (Bergerac).

Nervous about the prospect of having sex, Margie picks up a copy of Mother Goose and begins reading from it, causing Ted to faint.

Dr. Richards (D'Hondt), a psychiatrist, deduces that Ted has a "Mother Goose complex" and treats him with an LSD spray while he sleeps. This causes him to hallucinate and mix up reality with fairy tales.

Matters are complicated by the hotel detective Ernest Sinclair who believes that Ted, like his employer, Jacques Phillipe, is being unfaithful to his wife.

== Cast ==
- Tom Kirk as Ted Hastings
- Anne Helm as Margie Hastings
- Jacques Bergerac as Jacques Phillipe
- Danica d'Hondt as Dr. Marilyn Richards
- Robert Ball as Ernest Sinclair
- Joe Pyne as himself
- Henny Youngman as himself
- Barbara McNair as herself
- Fawn Silver as Goldy

== Production ==
Producer Jack H Harris was invited to the Sands Hotel in Las Vegas to see what he later described as "a musical interpretation of Mother Goose stories and nursery rhymes with a naughty twist." He said he "couldn't see filming this show to have a theatrical purpose, but I worked on the idea with Richard Clair."

The film was about a young man who was rendered impotent on hearing any reference to Mother Goose stories and nursery rhymes. Harris wanted to make the film and add it to the released schedule for their distribution company. He financed the film with a cash investment from a telemarketing company in return for a 40% interest in the film.

The film was shot in late 1965.

The women's costumes came from designer Guy Tassel and the men's from Botany 500. Harris says the investor backed out of paying, resulting in Harris deciding to direct himself to save money. His wife Muriel and her partner Jim Bechtold designed and dressed the sets with borrowed set pieces. The crew consisted of only six people. Harris said he told them "it wasn't a question of how many days of shooting. It was a question of how many hours of shooting we could afford."

Harris says shooting took ten days and editing and post production sixty days. "It looked like a million dollar movie...[with] sexy humour and... decent performances," claimed Harris.

Anne Helm was pregnant during filming. "It was sort of funny ’cause here I was bikini-clad — the sexual aspects of the movie were so ridiculous," she recalled. "They had my boobs hanging out and me laced up in all these tight frocks, and I was three and a half months pregnant. I only remember the movie because it was an exciting time for me: It was my first child."

Kirk (billed as "Tom Kirk") sung the title track "Mother Goose a Go Go".

== Release ==
The film was originally released as Mother Goose-a-Go-Go. Harris says this title proved hard to pronounce and difficult to put on a marquee. An exhibitor joked that "The Unscrewed Bride" would be an ideal title, prompting Harris to re-title it The Unkissed Bride. He says the film "enjoyed a passable companion feature gross theatrically, eventually becoming a semi-string VHS title" but admitted it was "a program picture that was not a big winner."
