= Bernie Knee =

American singer

- Born: Bernard Knee; February 14, 1924; The Bronx, New York City, New York
- Died: November 20, 1994 (aged 70); Fort Lauderdale, Florida

Bernie Knee (February 14, 1924 – November 20, 1994) was an actor and musician.

While his birth name was Bernard Knee, most music industry magazines spelled his name Bernie Nee, which was also how his name was spelled on most of the recordings he issued during the 1950s.

== Biography ==
=== Early life ===
Knee was born and raised in the Bronx, the son of Louis and Celia Knee. He was a 1948 graduate of New York University, and became interested in performing while serving in the Navy during World War II. A versatile musician, he played guitar, piano and bass in addition to being a vocalist. He performed at some of New York's biggest clubs, including the Copacabana, the Riverboat, and Michael's Pub. In addition, he became known as an accomplished demo singer who made more than 5,000 demo recordings for songwriters in many genres.

=== Career ===
Knee's biggest top-40 hit was one where his name did not appear: he was in a studio group called The Five Blobs. This band was assembled in Los Angeles, California for the express purpose of recording "The Blob", the title song for the Steve McQueen film The Blob. Written by Burt Bacharach and Mack David (Hal David's brother), the tune featured a prominent saxophone part. The single was released on Columbia Records and became a hit, peaking at No. 35 on the Billboard Hot 100 in November 1958. It also hit the Top Ten on the regional LA charts. The single's B side consisted of a song entitled "Saturday Night in Tiajuana" [sic] credited to Bacharach.

Bernie Nee was not listed on any of the promotional materials for the film or the record. To protest this oversight, Nee bought advertisements in music industry trade publications, showcasing his name, whereupon he was terminated from Columbia. Nee signed with Joy Records, where The Five Blobs released two 45s in 1959: "From the Top of Your Guggle (to the Bottom of Your Zooch)" backed with "Rockin' Pow Wow," and "Juliet" b/w "Young and Wild." He continued to record, make demos, and sing in New York area clubs into the mid-1960s. For example, he worked on "Sixteen Cubes of Sugar" (by Jack Keller and Howard Greenfield) and "That's What I Call True Love" (by Keller and Gerry Goffin), both with Carole King.

In 1974, he released "Hang In There, Mr. President" with Frank Yankovic and his Orchestra on a 45pm Telemark single, written by Henry Tobias in support of Richard Nixon's fight to avoid impeachment. He also made appearances on the Ballroom Broadway cast album (1979), Frank Sinatra's Trilogy (1980) and Max Conrad's Let's Fly! Flight Inspired Music.

=== Death ===
In 1979, Knee relocated to Fort Lauderdale, Florida, where he died of cancer in 1994, at age 70.

== Sources ==
- Bernie Knee at IMDb
