= Continental Stove Works =

- U.S. National Register of Historic Places
- U.S. Historic district
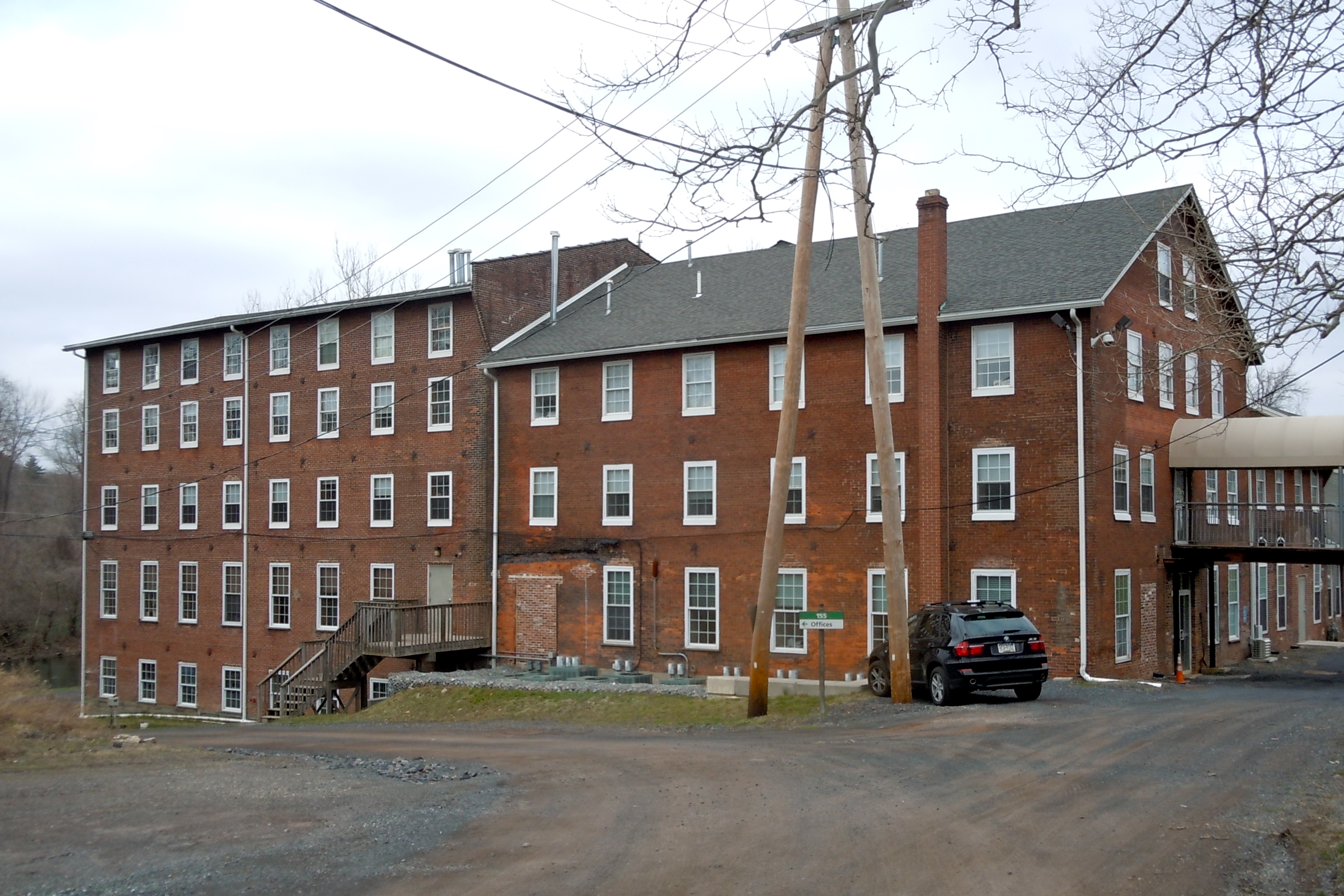
- Continental Stove Works, April 2011

- Location within Pennsylvania Location within the United States
- Location: First St. above Main, Royersford, Pennsylvania
- Coordinates: 40°11′04″N 75°32′44″W
- Area: 6 acres (2.4 ha)
- Built: 1876
- NRHP reference No.: 86000040
- Added to NRHP: January 9, 1986

Continental Stove Works, also known as the Buckwalter Stove Company, is a historic factory complex and national historic district located at Royersford, Montgomery County, Pennsylvania. It consists of 16 contributing buildings and one structure. The complex was built in two sections: between 1876 and 1924 and 1898 and 1908, some of which are interconnected. They are generally built of brick with stone foundations. One of the oldest buildings was built in 1876-1877, and is a 5 1/2-story, brick warehouse measuring 50 feet wide and 96 feet long. Another was also built in 1876-1877, and is a two-story brick building measuring 39 feet by 50 feet. The office building was also originally built in 1876-1877, and subsequently expanded to its present three-story size by 1923. The complex housed a number of regionally important producers of stoves during the late-19th and early-20th century. After the regional stove manufacturing industry collapsed during the Great Depression, the complex was occupied by a number of warehouses.

It was added to the National Register of Historic Places in 1986.
