= Equinox (1970 film) =

1970 American supernatural horror film

- Poster art
- Directed by: Jack Woods; Dennis Muren (uncredited)
- Screenplay by: Jack Woods
- Story by: Mark Thomas McGee
- Produced by: Jack H. Harris; Dennis Muren
- Starring: Edward Connell; Barbara Hewitt; Frank Bonner; Robin Christopher
- Cinematography: Mike Hoover
- Edited by: John Joyce
- Distributed by: Tonylyn Productions
- Release dates: May 6, 1970 (Dallas, Texas)
- Running time: 82 minutes
- Country: United States
- Language: English
- Budget: $8,000
- Box office: $849,600

Equinox is a 1970 American supernatural horror film directed by Jack Woods, and starring Edward Connell, Barbara Hewitt, Frank Bonner and Robin Christopher. Though uncredited, producer Dennis Muren also served as a second director. The film focuses on four young people picnicking in a California canyon, where they stumble upon an ancient book used to conjure demons; soon they unleash a plethora of evil creatures.

The film was originally conceived as a 71-minute feature by producer-director Muren—then titled The Equinox: Journey into the Supernatural—who developed and shot it with friends Dave Allen and Jim Danforth in 1967. After independent distributor Tonylyn Productions expressed interest in distributing the film, director Jack Woods was hired to shoot 11 min of additional footage for theatrical distribution.

Equinox initially gained a reputation as a midnight movie during its theatrical run, but has in later years been noted for its economical yet sophisticated use of stop-motion special effects and cel animation, which were provided by Allen and Danforth; the latter later worked on Flesh Gordon, in which he animated a giant monster similar to the ones in Equinox. The cult film has been influential to the horror and sci-fi monster genres, receiving praise from filmmaker George Lucas and special effects artist Ray Harryhausen. It was released on DVD by the Criterion Collection in 2006.

== Plot ==
A reporter visits David Fielding in a psychiatric hospital for a follow-up story on the deaths of his three friends exactly one year and one day ago. David is catatonic but attacks the reporter when shown a photo of Dr. Watermann, his former professor. In the scuffle, David loses his cross and grows frantic over its disappearance.

The reporter listens to tape recordings of the police interviewing David soon after he was brought to the hospital and reconstructs the events — told in flashback — that drove David insane.

David, Susan Turner, Jim Hudson and his girlfriend, Vicki, search for Dr. Watermann in a forest canyon and find that his cabin has been destroyed. While exploring a cave, they encounter a cackling old man who gives them an ancient book filled with magical lore and symbols. The book, which Watermann's notes describe as a "veritable bible of evil", reeks of sulfur and contains the Lord's Prayer written backwards. The group learns Watermann's experiments with the book's demon-summoning rituals went awry. When he lost control of the giant tentacled creature he conjured, it destroyed his house.

Dr. Watermann suddenly appears and snatches the book from David; he and Jim give chase. David tackles him, causing him to strike his head and die. After Jim and David leave, Watermann's body supernaturally vanishes. Disguised as a forest ranger, Asmodeus discovers Jim and David have the book and sends monsters – a giant ape-like creature and a green-skinned, fur-clad giant – to retrieve it. The ape-like creature kills the old man from the cave.

Asmodeus starts to sexually assault Susan, but her cross repels him. After Susan accidentally loses the cross, she appears demon-possessed and attacks Vicki, who is unable to stop her. David arrives and displays a mystical symbol from the book, causing Susan to lose consciousness.

Asmodeus kills Jim and pretends to be him, fooling David for a while before he realizes the truth and fights Asmodeus until getting knocked unconscious. Asmodeus then reveals his true form: a winged, red demon. After killing Vicki, Asmodeus attacks the now-awake David and Susan, who flee to a cemetery and cower behind a large stone cross atop a grave. As the demon flies into the cross and dies, the cemetery erupts in flames, killing Susan. A giant shadowy figure prophesies that David will be dead in one year and one day. David panics and flees to a nearby road, where a driverless car runs him down. A car with two passengers stops to help him.

David loses his sanity and is confined to a mental hospital. One year and one day later, an evil-faced, reanimated Susan arrives at the hospital to kill him.

== Cast ==
- Edward Connell as David Fielding
- Barbara Hewitt as Susan Turner
- Frank Bonner as Jim Hudson (as Frank Boers Jr.)
- Robin Christopher as Vicki
- Jack Woods as Asmodeus
- Fritz Leiber as Dr. Arthur Watermann
- James Philips as Reporter Sloan (as Jim Philips)
- Patrick Burke as Branson
- Jim Duron as Orderly and Green Giant
- Norvelle Brooks as Detective Harrison
- Irving L. Lichtenstein as Old Man
- Jim Danforth as Orderly with Syringe (uncredited)
- Forrest J. Ackerman as Doctor Johansson (voice; uncredited)
- Sharon Gray
- Louis Clayton

== Production ==
=== Development ===
While studying business at Pasadena City College, producer and aspiring filmmaker Dennis Muren devised a short science fiction film, The Equinox ... A Journey into the Supernatural, with his friends Dave Allen and Jim Danforth. The short film was made on a budget of approximately $6,500.

Tonylyn Productions, a small film company, liked the film enough to distribute it. Producer Jack H. Harris hired film editor Jack Woods, who previously worked with John Cassavetes, to direct additional footage in order to make Equinox into a feature-length film. The American Film Institute notes that the final production budget was $8,000. Re-titled to simply Equinox, Muren was credited as associate producer in spite of having directed much of the film and creating the special effects himself.

=== Filming ===
Principal photography took place in Tujunga, California, and Griffith Park in Los Angeles. Jim Duron played both the Orderly and the Green Giant.

== Release ==
Equinox premiered theatrically in Dallas, Texas on May 6, 1970. It later opened in Detroit on August 26, 1970, and in Los Angeles on March 31, 1971.

=== Home media ===
Not long after its original theatrical release, the film was made available in abridged Super 8 film reels designed for home exhibition.

Equinox was released on DVD in June 2006 as release 338 in the Criterion Collection, including both the theatrical version and Muren's original production, the first time the latter was officially released.

It also featured an introduction by the film's champion Forrest J. Ackerman.

== Critical response and legacy ==
In his review of the film, Bill Gibron from DVD Talk wrote, "In a strange way, Equinox is The Evil Dead with Ray Harryhausen substituting for Sam Raimi. There are so many obvious connections that you have to imagine Sam and his clan came across this version somewhere in the formation of their film and starting taking stylistic notes. While it can't compare with Dead's decided darkness, Equinox manages to be an effective entertainment."

Dave Sindelar from Fantastic Movie Musings and Ramblings gave the film a positive review, noting that "despite the obvious cheapness and the long shooting schedule which results in characters aging before your eyes", he felt the film was powerful and commended the film for its "compelling sense of Lovecraftian evil". Noel Murray from The A.V. Club rated the film a grade B, writing, "It's clear these guys had more ingenuity than resources, and watching Equinox is like a lesson in how to make something out of nothing."

Dennis Schwartz from Ozus' World Movie Reviews awarded the film a grade C, stating that the film was "noted only for its great special effects". Author and film critic Leonard Maltin gave the film 2 out of 4 stars, stating that the film "mixes movie clichés with good special effects".

Due to the similarities in their plots, Equinox is believed to have inspired The Evil Dead, though this has not been confirmed.

In an article for the Criterion Collection, Brock DeShane quotes Tom Sullivan, special effects and makeup artist for the Evil Dead movies, about seeing the film.

I had seen Equinox at least twice in drive-ins before making Evil Dead. I don't recall having discussed it with [Evil Dead director] Sam Raimi, but the similarities are remarkable. I think they come from the low-budget nature of both films. That is, a few characters, an isolated, inexpensive location, and ambitious special effects. All in all, Equinox did inspire me to continue my goal of making movies. 'If they can do it ... '

== See also ==
- List of cult films

== Sources ==
- Maltin, Leonard; Carson, Darwyn (2012). Leonard Maltin's Movie Guide 2013. New York City, New York: Signet. ISBN 978-0-451-23774-3.
- Mitchell, Charles P. (June 8, 2015). The Devil on Screen: Feature Films Worldwide, 1913 through 2000. Jefferson, North Carolina: McFarland. ISBN 978-1-4766-0533-3.
- Morton, Ray (2007). Close Encounters of the Third Kind: The Making of Steven Spielberg's Classic Film. New York City, New York: Applause Theatre & Cinema Books. ISBN 978-1-55783-710-3.
- Muir, John Kenneth (2012). Horror Films of the 1970s. JEfferson, North Carolina: McFarland. ISBN 978-0-7864-9156-8.
