= 4D Man =

1959 film

- Theatrical release poster
- Directed by: Irvin Yeaworth
- Written by: Jack H. Harris
- Produced by: Jack H. Harris
- Starring: Robert Lansing; Lee Meriwether; James Congdon
- Cinematography: Theodore J. Pahle
- Edited by: William B. Murphy
- Music by: Ralph Carmichael
- Production companies: Fairview Productions; Jack H. Harris Enterprises
- Distributed by: Universal-International
- Release date: October 7, 1959 (United States)
- Running time: 85 minutes
- Country: United States
- Language: English
- Budget: $300,000

4D Man (released in the UK as The Evil Force) is a 1959 American science-fiction film independently produced by Jack H. Harris (from his original screenplay), directed by Irvin S. Yeaworth Jr., and starring Robert Lansing, Lee Meriwether, and James Congdon. The film was released in color by De Luxe via Universal-International on October 7, 1959. It was later reissued in 1960 in the US under the title Master of Terror, so it could play as a double feature with Master of Horror (a 1959 retitled Argentinian Edgar Allan Poe anthology).

== Plot ==
Brilliant but irresponsible electrodynamics scientist Dr. Tony Nelson develops an electronic amplifier, intending to use it to convert any object into a fourth-dimensional (4D) state, allowing it to pass freely through any other object. Tony, however, ignores the overload, which sparks an electrical fire that burns down his laboratory. Now unemployed, Tony seeks out his brother, Scott, also a PhD, to help him with his experiment. Scott is a researcher in a plant located in West Chester, Pennsylvania called the Fairview Research Center, and is working on a material called Cargonite that is so dense that it is impenetrable.

Underpaid and unappreciated at his new job, Scott has become the driving force behind the development of Cargonite, named after his employer Theodore W. Carson. However, he is unmotivated to ask Carson for greater recognition, as Carson has been taking much of the credit for Scott's work. When his girlfriend and assistant, Linda Davis, falls for Tony, Scott furiously steals Tony's experiment and starts toying with it, eventually transforming himself into a 4D state. When demonstrating this to Tony, Scott leaves the amplifier power turned off, yet successfully passes his hand through a block of steel. Although amazed that Scott can now enter a 4D state at will, Tony warns him to conceal this ability until he can further test for possible side effects.

In the lab, Tony reflects on an earlier experiment of his, which involved fusing lead with gold: through an extremely slow process, the two substances can merge; he realizes that forging them immediately would break down the substances. While in the 4D state (signified by a "shimmering" sound effect), Scott can pass through any solid object. He experiments with his new abilities by shoplifting a piece of fruit through a grocery store's solid window. Scott also notices a diamond necklace on display in a nearby jewelry-store window but decides against stealing it. He soon discovers, though, that the process greatly accelerates his aging, and subsequently visits the company doctor Brian Schwartz, who suddenly drops dead while examining him. Initially horrified, he then realizes that he can rejuvenate himself by passing any part of his body through another person, thus draining the person's lifeforce.

The following day, news breaks that $50,000 was robbed from the bank without any sign of forced entry or video footage of the crime. Strangely, the press also reports that a $1,000 bill was found protruding from a solid piece of tempered steel, perplexing the authorities. Realizing that Scott is misusing and abusing his power, Tony attempts to convince the police.

Scott decides to utilize his newfound abilities to acquire money, recognition, power, and women, all of which he perceives he has been denied throughout his life. He first confronts Carson, revealing the results of his experiment before then vengefully and literally draining his lifeforce. Proceeding to a sleazy bar, he intimidates several tough men into backing down while en route. His newfound bravado causes him to overlook his hand going through the door while he is opening it. Euphoric from his victory over the toughs and his ill-gotten money, he impresses a bar girl with his looks, wit, and charm. When they later kiss, Scott's power reactivates, and the girl backs away from him before noticing a mirror; finding that she has rapidly aged and her formerly-blonde hair is now white, she flees in horror.

Now heavily aged, Scott returns to the lab, but the police are unable to stop him. After Scott regains his youthful form by killing a rival scientist who tried to steal Tony's work, Linda begs Scott to come to his senses. Scott kisses her, but unlike with the bar girl, his power is off, and she has not aged. Linda then shoots Scott in solid form. Bleeding and feeling betrayed, Scott maniacally proclaims his invincibility and defiantly phase-shifts his body (albeit with difficulty) through a wall embedded with supposedly impenetrable cargonite in front of Tony and Linda.

== Cast ==
- Robert Lansing as Dr. Scott Nelson / 4D Man
- Lee Meriwether as Linda Davis
- James Congdon as Dr. Tony Nelson
- Robert Strauss as Roy Parker
- Edgar Stehli as Dr. Theodore W. Carson
- Patty Duke as Marjorie Sutherland
- Guy Raymond as Fred the Guard
- Chic James as B-girl
- Elbert Smith as Capt. Rogers
- George Karas as Sgt. Todaman (como George Kara)
- Jasper Deeter as Dr. Welles
- Dean Newman as Dr. Brian Schwartz
- John Benson as reporter

== Production and release ==
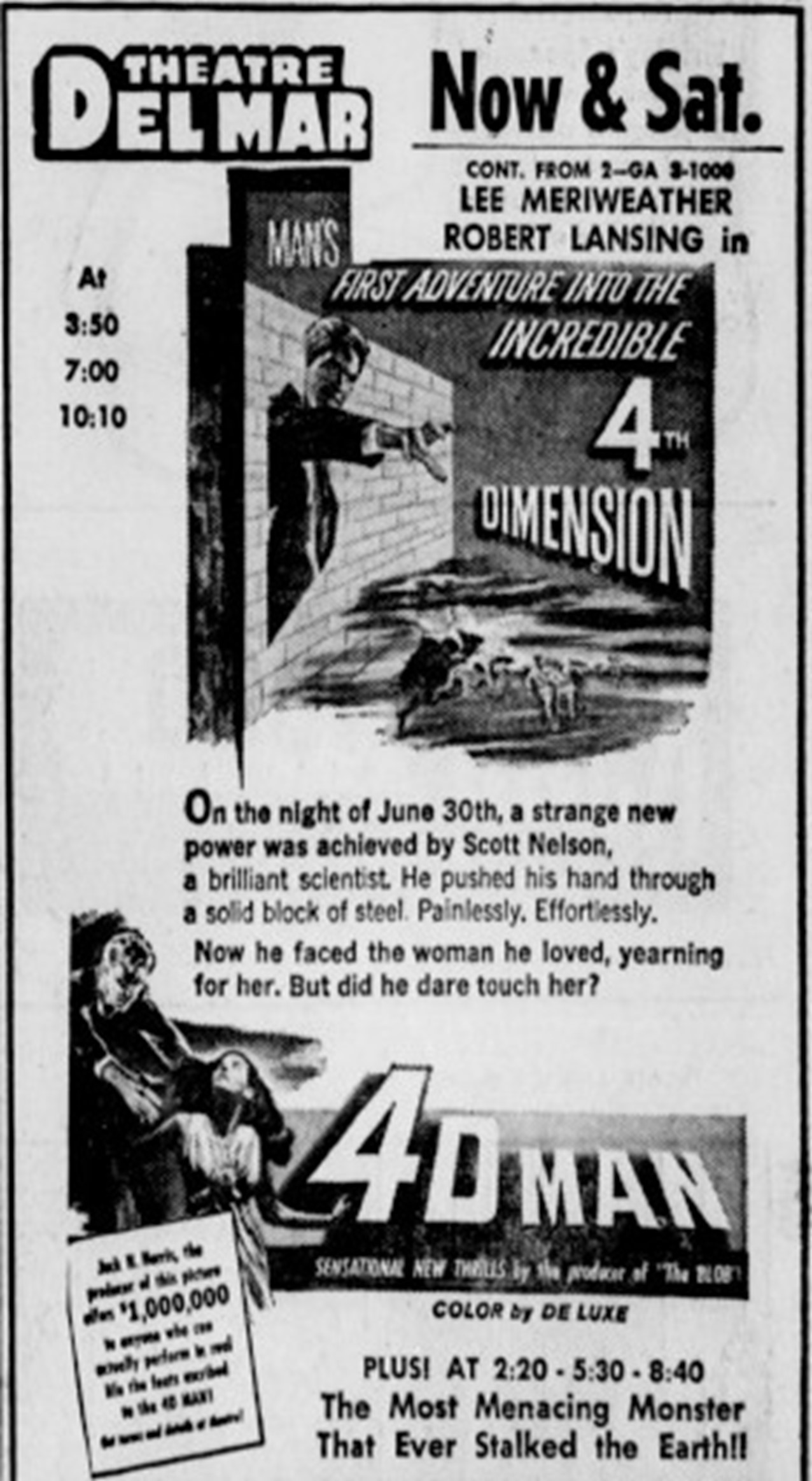
Advertisement from 1959

Jack H. Harris was able to begin production of the film with the money he had received from The Blob (1958), which was also directed by Yeaworth. Backing for the film came from non-industry sources and it was filmed in Chester Springs, Pennsylvania.

It was originally planned to be filmed in CinemaScope but the plan was scrapped due to lens problems.

It was the film debut of Lee Meriwether and Robert Lansing. Young Patty Duke also makes a small appearance in the film.

=== Reception ===
On Rotten Tomatoes, the film has an approval rating of 80%, based on five reviews, with a 5.5/10 average.

== See also ==
- Fourth dimension in literature
- "The Borderland"
- The Human Vapor

== Bibliography ==
- Warren, Bill. Keep Watching the Skies: American Science Fiction Films of the Fifties, 21st Century Edition (revised and expanded). Jefferson, North Carolina: McFarland & Company, 2009. ISBN 0-89950-032-3.
