= Prison Ship =

1986 film directed by Fred Olen Ray

- Film poster
- Directed by: Fred Olen Ray
- Written by: Miriam L. Preissel & Michael Sonye and Fred Olen Ray (original story); Michael Sonye (screenplay)
- Produced by: Fred Olen Ray; Jack H. Harris
- Starring: Sandy Brooke; Suzy Stokey; Ross Hagen; Marya Gant; Aldo Ray
- Cinematography: Paul Elliott
- Edited by: Miriam L. Preissel
- Music by: Anthony Harris
- Production companies: Viking International Pictures; Worldwide Entertainment Corporation
- Distributed by: Jack H. Harris Enterprises
- Release dates: 1986 (United States); May 11, 1987 (France)
- Running time: 86 minutes
- Country: United States
- Language: English
- Budget: $175,000

Prison Ship, also known as Star Slammer, Adventures of Taura, Part 1, Star Slammer: The Escape and Prison Ship Star Slammer, is a 1986 American science fiction film directed by Fred Olen Ray.

== Plot ==
On the planet Arous, Captain Bantor, the Sovereign and the Inquisitor attempt to quell an uprising of the defiant resident miners of Taura's planet by capturing her and killing her fellow dwarf miners and the wandering priest Zaal. Taura is forced to defend herself against the marauding starship captain. During their struggle, Taura causes Bantor to lose his hand in a volcanic acid plume. Taura is friendly to the locals and employs them in her mining operation. Bantor had attempted to claim the mined crystals for the Magistrate, leading to confrontation.

Taura is subsequently sentenced to a term aboard the prison ship, Vehemence, under the sadistic female warden, Exene. She finds life amid the other female inmates tough, but soon, gains their respect, making a friend in Mike.

Bantor then comes aboard Vehemence, now deranged as a result of losing his hand, seeking to obtain a mind control device that reduces the prisoners to zombies. His arrival proves to be Taura's chance to escape the prison ship or "star slammer" and return to her home planet of Arous.

== Cast ==
- Sandy Brooke as Taura
- Susan Stokey as Mike
- Marya Gant as Warden Exene
- Ross Hagen as Bantor
- Dawn Wildsmith as Muffin
- Richard Alan Hench as Garth
- Michael D. Sonye as Krago
- Mimi Monaco as Squeeker
- Jade Barrett as Dr. Po
- Lindy Skyles as The Sovereign
- Bobbie Bresee as Marai (credited as Bobbi Bresee)
- Johnny Legend as Zaal
- Aldo Ray as The Inquisitor
- John Carradine as The Judge

== Production ==
The film was originally shot at Roger Corman's New World Pictures studio on Main Street in Venice, California. Fred Olen Ray rented the studio for two weekends (four days). One day he spent shooting scenes for his film Biohazard. The other three days were spent filming promotional footage for a movie he wanted to make called Prison Ship. Ray says he was inspired by Roger Corman making The Terror using left over sets from The Raven. He used props from Galaxy of Terror. Aldo Ray was hired for one day's work. Susan Stokey also featured.

Ray then met producer Jack H. Harris at the American Film Market and showed him some footage he had shot for a movie called Prison Ship. Harris agreed to finance the film for $200,000 if it was called Star Slammer. Ray's fee was $15,000 and 50% of worldwide profits.

Ray made the film immediately after The Tomb and designed it to be a multi-chapter serial film. He originally hired Richard Hench to build sets but then felt the sets were costs and taking too long so he used Wayne Springfield, art director of Forbidden World. There were two days of filming at Iverson Ranch. Olen used the land rover from Logan's Run, an alien creature from The Deadly Spawn, costumes from Metalstorm: The Destruction of Jared-Syn, uniforms and sets from Galaxy of Terror, and footage from Dark Star and Battle Beyond the Stars. Ray later said he wished he had featured more female nudity in the film as that was what the women's prison market expected.

== Reception ==
In Creature Feature, the movie received one out of five stars, calling the movie "hilariously bad", citing the script as the main problem Austin Trunick writing for the website "Under the Radar" stated: "Star Slammer was shot quickly and on the cheap, but has far better production values than similar, bottom shelf sci-fi or women in prison flicks from the era. It hits most of the notes you’d expect from the genres – extraterrestrial dwarfs, robots, cat fights, a sadistic (female) warden, and forced combat". Moria gave the movie two stars, finding it a cheesy parody of science fiction and serial movies. TV Guide noted that the film was inept, finding it had many of the clichés of women in prison movies.

== Sequel ==
According to the end credits, a sequel called Chain Gang Planet was planned.
