= Jim Danforth =

American stop-motion animator (born 1940)

- Born: July 13, 1940 (age 86); United States

James Danforth (born July 13, 1940) is an American stop-motion animator, known for model-animation, matte painting, and for his work on When Dinosaurs Ruled the Earth (1970), a theme-sequel to Ray Harryhausen's One Million Years B.C. (1967). He later went on to work with Ray Harryhausen on the film Clash of the Titans (1981) to mainly do the animation of the winged horse Pegasus.

Danforth has been nominated twice for an Academy Award for Visual Effects for George Pal's 7 Faces of Dr. Lao (1964), and for When Dinosaurs Ruled the Earth (1970).

== Career ==
Danforth's first professional job was in television as a sculptor and artist for clay-animation pioneer Art Clokey, who had previously produced the beloved children's series Gumby (1957-1969) during the 1950s.

=== 1960s ===
Danforth was subsequently hired by the special effects company Project Unlimited and assisted a team of effects technicians on George Pal's celebrated 1960 feature-length science-fiction film, The Time Machine (1960), which won the Oscar for Best Visual Effects for that year.

Working with two other animators and a team of artists and technicians at Project Unlimited, Danforth did the model-animation effects for the fantasy film Jack the Giant Killer (1962), a film very similar to The 7th Voyage of Sinbad (1958), with both films having a similar story, the same director, Nathan Juran, and the same two lead actors, Kerwin Mathews and Torin Thatcher.

Danforth continued working at Project Unlimited to animate the dragon in The Wonderful World of the Brothers Grimm (1962).

In 1963, Danforth was hired by movie special effects pioneer Linwood G. Dunn to animate miniature versions of the comedians in the finale-sequence of Stanley Kramer's all-star comedy, It's a Mad, Mad, Mad, Mad World (1963). He also animated the miniature firetruck ladder for that sequence.

Danforth returned to Project Unlimited to produce effects and create monsters for the original 1963-65 TV series The Outer Limits. Some of his brief animation effects were for the plant creature at the end of the episode "Counterweight". Although often given credit for the title "Alien Insects" for the episode "The Zanti Misfits," they were actually animated by Al Hamm. In 1964, he was an un-credited prop maker for Star Trek's first pilot, "The Cage."

While still at Project Unlimited, Danforth was again hired by George Pal to do model animation for 7 Seven Faces of Dr. Lao (1964), featuring Tony Randall's multiple-role performance (which was Randall's favorite). Danforth received his first Oscar nomination for his work animating the shape-shifting Loch Ness Monster in the film, but lost to Disney's Mary Poppins (1964).)

In the mid-1960s, Danforth assisted fellow film maker Dennis Muren (later head of George Lucas's Industrial Light and Magic (ILM) visual effects facility, and winner of several Academy Awards of his own) with the making of a 16 mm 71 min film titled The Equinox... A Journey into the Supernatural. The film was later expanded with an additional 11 minutes by producer Jack H. Harris as the feature film Equinox (1970), which was later released on VHS as The Beast.) Danforth appeared as several 'extras' in the film and assisted in animating cells, painting mattes, and constructing sets and equipment, but did none of the film's stop-motion animation (which was done by Dave Allen and Dennis Muren). (Photo of Jim Danforth and matte painting from "Equinox" copyright 1965, 2006 Susan Turner)

=== 1970s ===
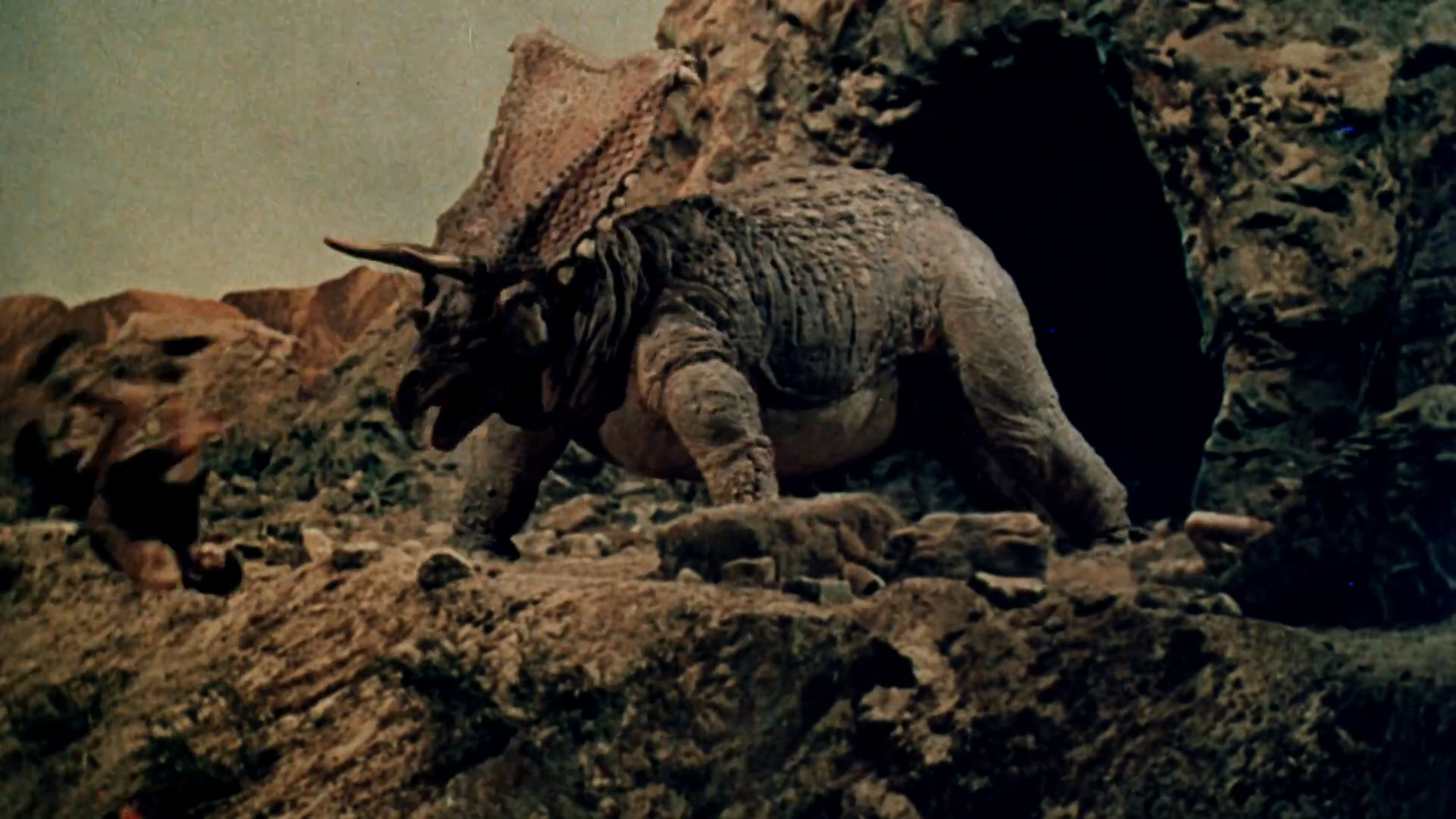
The Chasmosaurus from When Dinosaurs Ruled the Earth

Wanting a sequel to its 1966 film One Million Years B.C. (and unable to hire Harryhausen again, who was working on The Valley of Gwangi at the time), England's Hammer Films hired Danforth to animate the dinosaurs in When Dinosaurs Ruled the Earth (1970). Danforth refined the ability of his dinosaur models to realistically convey emotions, and developed the first use of motion-blurring for the animation of the models by using thin wires to move parts of them during the exposure of each frame. The film earned him a second Academy Award nomination for Best Visual Effects, losing to Walt Disney's Bedknobs and Broomsticks (1970). He shared the nomination with Roger Dicken.

During the early 1970s, Danforth did pre-production special effects tests for film producer Harry Saltzman on the unmade film Cold War in a Country Garden (a.k.a. The Micronauts). This proposed film that dealt with miniaturised spies was part of what film historian John Brosnan calls the "shrunken man" cycle of films best exemplified by the film Fantastic Voyage (1966). Danforth's work "involved compositing live action elements with glass painting during a camera tilt down."

In the early 1970s, Danforth was hired to do a model animation sequence of a "beetle man" for the underground feature film Flesh Gordon (1974). Not comfortable with the film being a semi-porn comedy, Danforth requested that his name not be included in the credits, but the film's producer, Howard Ziehm, included his name anyway, as "Mij Htrofnad" (spelled backwards).

Danforth then briefly joined with producer-actor (and, later, director) Dan O'Bannon and first-time director John Carpenter to provide some matte paintings for the independent counter-culture science fiction cult-hit comedy Dark Star (1975), which started as a short film and expanded by producer Jack H. Harris into a feature film, which was nominated for an effects Oscar (losing to Albert Whitlock's polished work on The Hindenburg).

In 1975, due to his dislike of the screenplay, Danforth rejected a personal carte-blanche offer from Dino De Laurentiis to create a stop-motion sequence for the De Laurentiis remake of King Kong, but accepted a contract with Universal to design creatures and animation for its competing film project The Legend of King Kong (which was later suspended, and then canceled after the release of the De Laurentiis film).

When the De Laurentiis King Kong was awarded an Academy Award for Best Visual Effects, even though the effects nominating committee for the Academy of Motion Picture Arts and Sciences had made no such recommendation, Danforth quit the committee and the Academy in protest.

Danforth wrote, directed, co-produced and designed effects for a film called Timegate, but it was later shelved.

=== 1980s ===
In 1979, Danforth was hired, along with Rick Baker, to design effects for Edward Pressman's proposed production Conan, which evolved into Conan the Barbarian (1982), with neither Danforth or Baker were involved with. Although Danforth was not directly involved on the visual effects of the John Milius project, he was hired to paint a matte shot during postproduction. He executed a matte painting for the penultimate shot of the film, showing Conan and the princess walking down toward a painting of a landscape valley. Danforth also provided a matte painting for the little-known film, The Day Time Ended (1980).

Danforth was subsequently hired to create the visual effects for the prehistoric spoof comedy Caveman (1981) starring ex-Beatle Ringo Starr. Danforth designed the dinosaurs and directed the live-action scenes in which the dinosaurs would appear, but the hands-on animation was done by David Allen, Randy Cook and Pete Kleinow. Danforth left the project "about two-thirds of the way."

Then Danforth returned to England to assist on Ray Harryhausen's last film Clash of the Titans (1981) and animated portions of the Kraken sequence, the two-headed wolf sequences and most of the Pegasus sequence.

In the mid-1980s, he was hired to do the "thought-box" matte shots for Danforth-fan Mike Jittlov's first feature film The Wizard of Speed and Time (1988 /released to theaters in 1989, and later on VHS and Laserdisc), based on Jittlov's 1980 short film of the same name. Jim and his wife appear briefly on camera as two space shuttle astronauts in orbit during the film's final effects extravaganza sequence and also appear in a sequence spoofing the Directors Guild.

During the late 1980s and early 1990, he was involved with the John Carpenter films Body Bags (1993), They Live (1988), Prince of Darkness (1987), and Memoirs of an Invisible Man (1992), providing matte paintings, optical effects, stop motion animation, and second-unit direction.

=== 1990s ===
Throughout the 1990s, he kept a lower profile, mainly providing matte paintings and supervising composite matte work on several films, a continuation of his film work since the 1960s. Comprehensive lists of these are at the Internet Movie Database. A link to that site is below.

Danforth presently lives and works in Los Angeles, creating fine-art and fantasy-genre paintings.

=== 2000s ===
In the early 2010s, he released a detailed autobiography of his personal life and film career, titled "Dinosaurs, Dragons, and Drama", on two CD-ROMs. These include many rare photos and detailed technical information (which he decided not to publish in printed book form for economic reasons). A third volume was released in 2022.

== Documentaries ==
Danforth is also featured in the documentary film The Fantasy Film Worlds of George Pal (1985), produced and directed by Arnold Leibovit.
