= Roger Dicken =

British special effects artist (1939–2024)

- Born: 15 April 1939; Portsmouth, Hampshire, England
- Died: 18 February 2024 (aged 84); North Wales
- Occupation: Special effects artist

Roger Dicken (15 April 1939 – 18 February 2024) was a British special effects artist. He was nominated for an Academy Award in the category Best Visual Effects for the film When Dinosaurs Ruled the Earth.

Dicken died on 18 February 2024, at his home in North Wales, at the age of 84.

At the 97th Academy Awards, his name was mentioned in the In Memoriam section.

== Selected filmography ==
- Thunderbirds Are Go (1966, rock snakes)
- The Blood Beast Terror (1967, moth suit)
- Witchfinder General (film) (1968)
- 2001 A Space Odyssey (1968, lunar landscapes)
- Scars of Dracula (1970, bat puppet)
- When Dinosaurs Ruled the Earth (1971; co-nominated with Jim Danforth)
- The Land That Time Forgot (1974)
- Warlords of Atlantis (1978)
- Alien (1979, facehugger and chest burster effects)
