= The Five Blobs =

Music group

The Five Blobs were an American group of studio musicians put together in 1958 by session leader Bernie Knee. While his birth name was Bernard Knee, most music industry magazines spelled his name Bernie Nee, and that is also how his name is spelled on all the recordings he made during the 1950s. The ensemble that became The Five Blobs was assembled in Los Angeles, California for the express purpose of recording "The Blob", the title song for the Steve McQueen film The Blob. Written by Burt Bacharach and Mack David (Hal David's brother), the tune featured a prominent saxophone part. The single was released on Columbia Records and became a hit, peaking at No. 33 on the Billboard Hot 100 in November 1958. The single's B side was a song entitled "Saturday Night in Tiajuana" [sic] credited to Bacharach. The song is featured on many Halloween-themed compilations. A version of "The Blob" by the Zanies was a regional hit in Los Angeles.

Bernie Nee was not listed on any of the promotional materials for the film or the record. To protest this oversight, Nee released an advertisement in the music industry trade publications, showcasing his name, whereupon he was terminated from Columbia. Nee signed onto Joy Records, where The Five Blobs released two 45s in 1959: "From the Top of Your Guggle (to the Bottom of Your Zooch)" backed with "Rockin' Pow Wow," and "Juliet" b/w "Young and Wild."
