= Way Out (film) =

1967 American drama film

- Directed by: Irvin Yeaworth
- Starring: Franklin Rodríguez
- Release date: 1967
- Running time: 102 minutes
- Country: United States
- Language: English

Way Out is a 1967 drama film directed by Irvin Yeaworth and starring Franklin Rodríguez and Sharyn Jimenez.

== Premise ==
The film follows the story of two men who become heroin addicts.

== Cast ==
- Franklin Rodríguez as Frankie
- James Dunleavy as Jim
- Sharyn Jimenez as Anita
- Jerry Rutkin as Jerry
- Starr Ruiz as Stella
- Gilbert Mesa as Fats
- Cecil White as Che Che
- Louis Colon as Louie
- Rudy Rosado as Rudy
- John Gimenez as Pop

== Production ==
Filming took place in Melrose, Bronx, New York City.
