= The Flaming Teen-Age =

1956 film

- Directed by: Irvin Yeaworth
- Starring: Noel Reyburn
- Release date: 1956
- Running time: 69 minutes
- Country: United States
- Language: English

The Flaming Teen-Age is a 1956 film directed by Irvin Yeaworth (in his directorial debut). It stars Noel Reyburn and Ethel Barrett.

== See also ==
- List of American films of 1956
