= The Blob =

1958 film by Irvin Yeaworth

- Theatrical release poster
- Directed by: Irvin S. Yeaworth Jr. Russell Doughten
- Screenplay by: Theodore Simonson; Kate Phillips
- Story by: Irving H. Millgate
- Produced by: Jack H. Harris
- Starring: Steven McQueen; Aneta Corsaut; Earl Rowe; Olin Howland
- Cinematography: Thomas E. Spalding
- Edited by: Alfred Hillmann
- Music by: Ralph Carmichael
- Production companies: Fairview Productions; Tonylyn Productions; Valley Forge Films
- Distributed by: Paramount Pictures
- Release date: September 10, 1958 (United States)
- Running time: 86 minutes
- Country: United States
- Language: English
- Budget: $110,000
- Box office: $4 million

The Blob is a 1958 American science fiction horror film directed by Irvin S. Yeaworth Jr. from a screenplay by Theodore Simonson and Kate Phillips, based on an idea by Irving H. Millgate. It stars Steve McQueen (in his first leading role) and Aneta Corsaut and co-stars Earl Rowe and Olin Howland.

The film concerns a carnivorous amoeboid alien that crashes to Earth from outer space inside a meteorite, landing near the small communities of Phoenixville and Downingtown, Pennsylvania. It envelops living beings, growing larger, becoming redder in color and more aggressive, eventually becoming larger than a building.

The Blob was released on September 10, 1958 by Paramount Pictures as a double feature with I Married a Monster from Outer Space (1958).

== Plot ==
In a small Pennsylvania town in July 1957, teenager Steve Andrews and his girlfriend Jane Martin kiss at a lovers' lane when they see a meteorite crash beyond the next hill. Steve goes looking for it but Barney, an old man living nearby, finds it first. When he pokes the meteorite with a stick, it breaks open and a small jelly-like globule blob inside attaches itself to his hand. In pain and unable to scrape or shake it loose, Barney runs onto the road, where he is nearly struck by Steve's car. Steve and Jane take him to Doctor Hallen.

Doctor Hallen anesthetizes the man and sends Steve and Jane back to locate the impact site and gather information. Hallen decides he must amputate the man's arm since it is being phagocytosed. Before he can, the Blob completely absorbs Barney, then Hallen's nurse Kate, and finally the doctor himself, growing redder and larger with each victim. Steve and Jane return in time for Steve to witness the doctor trying to escape through the window with the Blob covering him. They go to the police station and return with Lieutenant Dave Barton and Sergeant Jim Bert, but they find no sign of the Blob nor its victims. The skeptical Bert dismisses Steve's story as a prank. Steve and Jane are taken home by their parents, but they sneak out later.

The Blob absorbs a mechanic at a repair shop. During a midnight screening of Daughter of Horror at the Colonial Theater, Steve recruits Tony and his friends to warn people about the Blob. When Steve notices that his father's grocery store is unlocked, he and Jane go inside to investigate. The janitor is nowhere to be seen. The couple is quickly cornered by the Blob and they seek refuge in the walk-in freezer. The Blob oozes under the door but quickly retreats. Steve and Jane gather their friends and set off the town's fire and air-raid alarms. The responding townspeople and police still refuse to believe them. The Blob enters the Colonial Theater and envelops the projectionist, then oozes into the auditorium. Steve is finally vindicated when screaming people flee the theater in panic.

Steve, Jane and her kid brother Danny are trapped in a diner, along with the owner and a waitress, as the Blob—now enormous from the dozens of people it has consumed in the theater—engulfs the building. Lieutenant Dave taps into the diner's telephone with his police radio and warns those in the diner to shelter in the cellar before the police bring down a live power line onto the Blob.

Dave and Bert plan to electrocute the Blob by felling an overhead high-voltage power line. It discharges a massive electric current into the Blob, which is unaffected, but the diner underneath is set ablaze. When the diner's owner uses a carbon dioxide fire extinguisher on the approaching fire inside, Steve notices that the Blob recoils. Steve remembers it also retreated from the freezer and realizes it cannot tolerate cold temperatures. Shouting, in hopes of being picked up on the open phone line, Steve tells Dave about the Blob's vulnerability to cold. The firemen have a limited supply of CO_{2} fire extinguishers. Jane's father, high school principal Henry Martin, leads Steve's friends to break into the school to retrieve its extinguishers. When they return, a brigade of fire extinguisher-armed students, firemen and police drive the Blob away from the diner, freeing the five trapped there. They surround and freeze the Blob.

Dave requests authorities send an Air Force heavy-lift cargo aircraft to transport the frozen Blob to the Arctic. Dave realizes that the cold will stop the Blob "as long as the Arctic stays cold", but it won't kill it. Parachutes bearing the Blob on a pallet lower it onto an Arctic ice field with the superimposed words The End morphing into a question mark.

== Cast ==
- Steve McQueen (credited as Steven McQueen) as Steve Andrews
- Aneta Corseaut as Jane Martin
- Earl Rowe as Lt. Dave Barton
- Olin Howland (Credited as Olin Howlin) as Barney, the Old Man (Note: Olin Howland appeared in his last film role. He died the following year.)
- Stephen Chase as Dr. T. Hallen
- John Benson as Sgt. Jim Bert
- George Karas as Officer Ritchie
- Lee Payton as Kate, nurse
- Elbert Smith as Henry Martin
- Hugh Graham as Mr. Andrews
- Vince Barbi as George, cafe owner
- Audrey Metcalf as Elizabeth Martin
- Jasper Deeter as Civil defense volunteer
- Tom Ogden as Fire Chief
- Elinor Hammer as Mrs. Porter
- Ralph Roseman as Blob victim working on car
- Charlie Overdorff as Marty
- David Matcalf as Drunk at door
- George Gerbereck
- Julie Cousins as Sally, Waitress
- Keith Almoney as Danny Martin
- Eugene Sabel as Movie Theater Projectionist
- Russ Conway as Boy Running Out of Theater
- Howard Fishlove as Man Running Out of Theater
- Jack H. Harris as Man Running Out of Theater
- Vincent Mastrangelo as Movie Theater Patron
- Theodore Simonson as Red Sweater Moviegoer

The teenagers

- Robert Fields as Tony Gressette
- James Bonnett as "Mooch" Miller
- Anthony Franke as Al
- Pamela Curran as Smooching teenager
- Josh Randolf as Teenager
- Molly Ann Bourne as Teenager
- Diane Tabben as Teenager

== Production ==
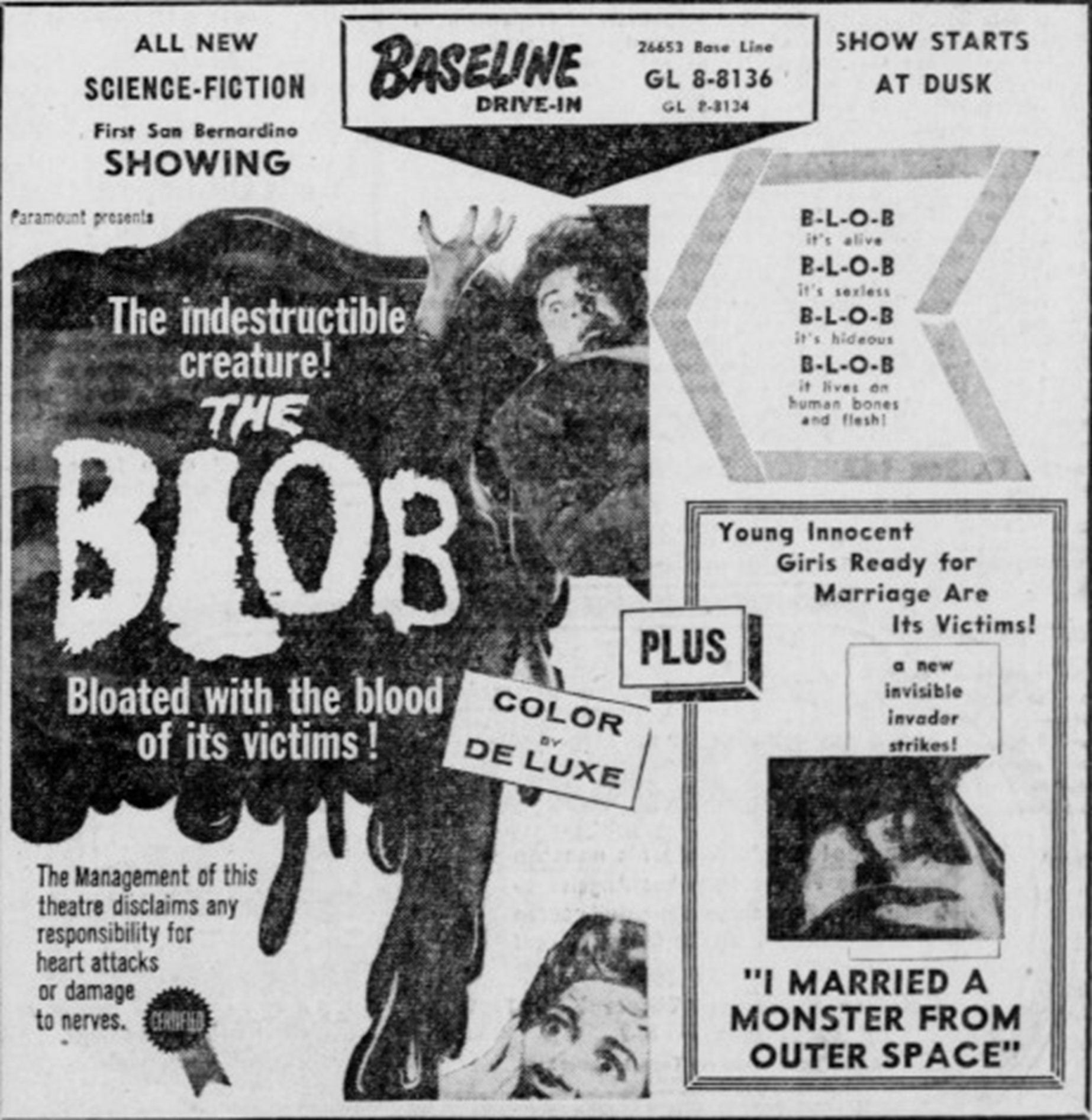
San Bernardino, California Drive-in advertisement from 1958 for The Blob and co-feature, I Married a Monster from Outer Space.

The film was the first production of Jack Harris, a film distributor from Philadelphia, and was reportedly inspired by the discovery of star jelly in Pennsylvania in 1950. It was originally titled The Molten Meteor until producers overheard screenwriter Kay Linaker refer to the film's monster as "the blob". Other sources give a different account, saying the film went through a number of title changes (the monster was called "the mass" in the shooting script) before the makers settled on The Glob. After hearing that cartoonist Walt Kelly had used The Glob as a title for his Pogo children's book, they mistakenly believed they couldn't use that title, so they changed it to The Blob. (Note: "During the production, crew members were invited to write any title they could imagine for the film. 'The one that used to get all the laughs when people repeated it,' recalled Harris, 'was The Glob That Girdled the Globe. We had another one: Absorbine Senior. I liked that. And, The Night of the Creeping Dread. We were really serious about that one, because it was a "tuxedo" title; The Glob That Girdled the Globe was a "dumb" title. I love one-word titles, having distributed many of them, so I said, "Let's call it The Glob." Finally everybody agreed. We were applying for copyright, and somebody had done a little investigation and found there was a book called The Glob, by Walt Kelly, the cartoonist. I didn't know any better then. Today, I know I could have called the picture The Glob, because you can't copyright titles.'") Although the budget was set at $120,000, it ended up costing only $110,000.

The film was the second feature directed by Irvin Yeaworth. Filmed in and around Valley Forge, Pennsylvania, principal photography took place in the summer of 1957 at Valley Forge Studios. Several scenes were filmed in the towns of Chester Springs, Downingtown, Phoenixville and Royersford, including the basement of a local restaurant that is currently named Downingtown Diner. For the diner scene, a photograph of the building was placed on a gyroscopically operated table onto which cameras were mounted. The table was shaken, and the Blob rolled off. When the film negative was printed in reverse, it appeared to be oozing over the building. (Note: The setting is apparently Downingtown, Pennsylvania itself, as the one policeman identifies his department's office as "Downingtown HQ to East Cornwall HQ" over the two-way radio during his chess game, and the final scenes take place in a restaurant that is clearly labeled "Downingtown Diner".) The Blob was filmed in color and projected at a 1.66 ratio (then known as the "Paramount format").

Steve McQueen received $3,000 for his starring role. He turned down an offer of a smaller upfront fee in exchange for a 10% share of profits, thinking the film would never make money; he needed his signing fee immediately to pay for food and rent. However, The Blob ended up a hit, grossing $4 million at the box office.

The film's tongue-in-cheek title song, "The Blob" [Columbia 42150A], was written by Burt Bacharach and Mack David. It became a nationwide hit in the United States, peaking at #33 on the Billboard Hot 100 chart on November 9, 1958. It was recorded by a studio group who adopted the name The Five Blobs. (The vocals are all by singer Bernie Knee, overdubbing himself.)

The Blob's background score was by Ralph Carmichael, who, like Yeaworth, had worked on television specials for the Billy Graham Evangelistic Association; it was supervised by the director's wife, Jean Yeaworth. It was one of only a few film scores Carmichael wrote. He composed different opening music for the film—a piece called "Violence", intended to start the film on a serious, frightening note. However, the director chose to replace it with the novelty song "The Blob" to encourage audiences to view it as campy fun. The song has contributed to the film's enduring popularity. The original score and title song were both included on the soundtrack album, which was re-released in 2008 on the Monstrous Movie Music soundtrack label.

== Release ==
Original trailer for The Blob.

Paramount acquired The Blob for $300,000 from Jack Harris and spent another $300,000 promoting it. According to Tim Dirks, it was one of a wave of "cheap teen movies" for the drive-in market—"exploitative, cheap fare created especially for [young people] in a newly-established teen/drive-in genre".

Harris eventually bought back the rights from Paramount, with Allied Artists Pictures Corporation reissuing it as a double feature with Harris and Yeaworth's Dinosaurus! in 1964.

=== Home media ===
The Blob has been released as part of the Criterion Collection on three formats: LaserDisc (1988), DVD (2000) and Blu-ray (2013). The DVD and Blu-ray feature new cover art by Michael Koelsch. The film, together with Son of Blob, was released on DVD in Australia by Umbrella Entertainment in September 2011. The DVD is compatible with all region codes and has special features, including audio commentaries with Jack H. Harris, Bruce Eder, Irvin Yeaworth and Robert Fields. In November 2016, Umbrella released a 2-disc Blu-ray, The Blob Collection, featuring the 1988 version of The Blob and the 1958 version of The Blob. Disc two also includes the Criterion Collection's opening identification, although the release was distributed by Umbrella Entertainment with no mention of Criterion on the disc sleeve.

== Reception ==
The Blob received negative reviews upon release. The New York Times highlighted some of its problems and identified some positives, although Steve McQueen's starring debut was not one of them. On director Irvin Yeaworth's work, they wrote:

Unfortunately, his picture talks itself to death, even with the blob nibbling away at everybody in sight. And most of his trick effects, under the direction of Irvin S. Yeaworth Jr., look pretty phony. On the credit side, the camera very snugly frames the small-town background—a store, a church spire, several homes and a theatre. The color is quite good (the blob rolls around in at least a dozen horrible-looking flavors, including raspberry). The acting is pretty terrible itself, there is not a single becomingly familiar face in the cast, headed by young Steven McQueen and Aneta Corseaut.

Variety had a similar reaction, seeing McQueen as the star, gamely "giving the old college try", but that the "... star performers, however, are the DeLuxe color camerawork of Thomas Spalding and Barton Sloane's special effects".

Writing for Famous Monsters of Filmland in 1962, Joe Dante Jr. included The Blob in his list of the worst horror films ever. Dante found the film spent too much time on drag racing, and disliked how the monster was dealt with at the end.

In a discussion with biologist Richard Dawkins, astrophysicist Neil deGrasse Tyson stated that among all Hollywood aliens, which were usually disappointing, The Blob was his favorite from a scientific perspective. The ethnobiologists Oscar Requejo and N. Floro Andres-Rodriguez suggest that the slime mould Fuligo septica may have inspired the film's eponymous blob.

The film review aggregator website Rotten Tomatoes gives the film a 68% "Fresh" approval rating based on 31 reviews, with an average rating of 6.3/10. The website's critical consensus reads, "In spite of its chortle-worthy premise and dated special effects, The Blob remains a prime example of how satisfying cheesy B-movie monster thrills can be."

=== Box office ===
Paramount initially ordered 200 prints of the film. Following the first week grosses from 15 Los Angeles theaters (which outgrossed the studio's Rock-A-Bye Baby and other films), it doubled the number of prints. The first week grosses in Los Angeles included $14,900 from the Hillstreet and Hawaii theaters. The film earned theatrical rentals of $1 million in its first year of release in the United States and Canada.

== Sequel ==
Beware! The Blob, a sequel directed by Larry Hagman, was released in June, 1972. The creature is the same "Blob" from the 1958 film, this time inadvertently unearthed by a bulldozer crew building an oil pipeline in the Arctic. With the crew unaware of its origins, a small specimen is placed in a frozen storage container, and taken back to suburban Los Angeles to be analyzed in a lab - escaping when the container is left to thaw. The Blob again wreaks havoc, culminating in hundreds of victims consumed before it is again frozen, this time on an ice rink under renovation. Presented as a "horror comedy", the film was also released under the title Son of Blob in 1972. As this was Hagman's first feature film as director, home video releases used the tagline, "The Movie That J.R. Shot", a play on "Who shot J.R.?", a widely circulated catchphrase about the near-demise of the character Hagman played in the television series Dallas.

== Remakes ==
A remake with the same name was directed by Chuck Russell and was released in 1988 by TriStar Pictures.

In August 2009, it was announced that musician-turned-director Rob Zombie was working on another remake, but he later left the project. He was replaced by Simon West as director in January 2015. It was announced that the film would be produced by Richard Saperstein and Brian Witten, with the producer of the original film, Jack H. Harris, as executive producer. Harris died in 2017.

As of January 2024, West had stepped down from his role as director, following delays and a rights dispute. David Bruckner was then hired to write and direct, with David S. Goyer and Keith Levine attached as producers and Judith Harris (the rights holder and widow of the franchise producer) serving as executive producer. The project will be a joint-venture production between Warner Bros. Motion Pictures Group, and Phantom Four Films.

== Influence ==
The 1958 Japanese film The H-Man directed by Ishiro Honda, resembles The Blob, although it was released months earlier. From an original story by Hideo Kaijo, the English version was released in the United States by Columbia Pictures in 1959. In it, a creeping radioactive blob consumes human flesh on contact, leaving clothing behind. As well, a ghostly image of dissolved humans sometimes appear in an illuminated green cloud of radiation.

The 1959 Italian movie Caltiki - The Immortal Monster has similarities to The Blob, with a meteor-related amorphous blob devouring people.

The opening scene of the 1988 horror-comedy Killer Klowns from Outer Space closely parallels that of The Blob. Both movies also have a decent cop named Dave who does not believe the young people, and a crabby older cop who seems to have a grudge against young citizens.

The 1999 John Lafia film Monster! includes a theater scene apparently inspired by The Blob's.

The film Monsters vs. Aliens has characters based on classic 1950s movie monsters, including B.O.B. (Benzoate Ostylezene Bicarbonate), an amoeboid creature.

The John Carpenter version of The Thing has a virtually identical camera shot of a body lying under a blanket on a gurney in which the blanket moves. It is similar to the scene in The Blob in the doctor's office with the old man under the blanket.

In the Hotel Transylvania franchise, one of Dracula's friends is a huge, indestructible green amoeboid creature called "Blobby" who is able to absorb and regurgitate anything in his path.

In computing, a blob is a collection of binary data stored as a single entity. Blobs are typically images, audio or other multimedia objects, although executable code is sometimes stored as a blob. Blobs were originally just big amorphous chunks of data invented by Jim Starkey at DEC, who describes them as "the thing that ate Cincinnati, Cleveland, or whatever" from "the 1958 Steve McQueen movie", referring to The Blob.

== Legacy ==
Since 2000, the town of Phoenixville, Pennsylvania, one of the filming locations, has held an annual "Blobfest", including a reenactment of the scene in which moviegoers run screaming from the town's now-restored Colonial Theatre.

The Blob itself was made from silicone, with increasing amounts of red vegetable dye added as it "absorbed" people. In 1965, it was bought by film collector Wes Shank, who has written a book about the making of The Blob. It remains liquid and pliable to this day, and is displayed in a museum in it's original pail.

According to Jeff Sharlet in his book The Family, The Blob was "about the creeping horrors of communism", defeated only "by freezing it—the Cold War writ small and literal". Rudy Nelson, one of the film's scriptwriters, has denied many of Sharlet's assertions, saying, "What on earth can Sharlet say about the movie that will fill 23 pages—especially when what he thinks he knows is all wrong?".

In 1997, film historians Kim R. Holston and Tom Winchester noted that The Blob was "filmed in southeastern Pennsylvania at Valley Forge Studios, (and) this very famous piece of pop culture is a model of a decent movie on a small budget".

The film is recognized by American Film Institute in these lists:

- 2001: AFI's 100 Years...100 Thrills – Nominated
- 2003: AFI's 100 Years...100 Heroes & Villains:
  - "The Blob" – Nominated Villain

== See also ==
- List of American films of 1958
- List of cult films
- Star jelly - said to inspire movie premise (from 1950 incident in Pennsylvania)
- BLOB (Binary Large OBject), inspired by this film.

== Bibliography ==
- Dante, Jr., Joe (July 1962). "Dante's Inferno". Famous Monsters. Vol. 4, no. 3. Central Publications, Inc.
- Holston, Kim R.; Winchester, Tom (1997). Science Fiction, Fantasy and Horror Film Sequels, Series and Remakes: An Illustrated Filmography. Jefferson, North Carolina: McFarland & Company. ISBN 978-0-7864-0155-0.
- Magrì, Antonio (2009). Di Blob in Blob. Analisi di semiotica comparata. Cinema Tv e Linguaggio del corpo. Roome: Aracne editrice. ISBN 978-8-85482-711-0.
- Shank, Wes (2009). From Silicone to the Silver Screen: Memoirs of the Blob (1958). Los Angeles. ISBN 978-0-57804-728-7.
- Sharlet, Jeff (2008). The Family: The Secret Fundamentalism at the Heart of American Power. New York: Harper. ISBN 978-0-06056-005-8.
- Warren, Bill. Keep Watching the Skies: Science Fiction Films of the Fifties, 21st Century Edition. 2009. Jefferson, North Carolina: McFarland & Company,(First Editions Vol. 1, 1982, Vol. 2, 1986). ISBN 0-89950-032-3.
- Weaver, Tom (2002). "Interview with Russ Doughten". Science Fiction Confidential: Interviews with 23 Monster Stars and Filmmakers. Jefferson, North Carolina: McFarland & Company. ISBN 978-0-78641-175-7.
