= Beware! The Blob =

1972 film by Larry Hagman

- Theatrical release poster
- Directed by: Larry Hagman
- Screenplay by: Anthony Harris; Jack Woods
- Story by: Richard Clair; Jack H. Harris
- Produced by: Anthony Harris
- Starring: Robert Walker Jr.; Godfrey Cambridge; Carol Lynley; Shelley Berman; Larry Hagman; Richard Stahl; Dick Van Patten; Gwynne Gilford; Richard Webb; Marlene Clark; Gerrit Graham; J. J. Johnston; Danny Goldman; Randy Stonehill; Cindy Williams; Burgess Meredith
- Cinematography: Al Hamm
- Edited by: Tony de Zarraga
- Music by: Mort Garson
- Production companies: Jack H. Harris Enterprises, Inc.
- Distributed by: Jack H. Harris Enterprises Inc.
- Release date: June 21, 1972
- Running time: 91 minutes
- Country: United States
- Language: English
- Budget: $150,000 (estimated)

Beware! The Blob (also known as Beware the Blob, Son of Blob, The Blob II or The Blob Returns) is a 1972 American independent science fiction comedy horror film directed by Larry Hagman. It is a sequel to The Blob (1958). The screenplay was penned by Anthony Harris and Jack Woods III, based on a story by Jack H. Harris and Richard Clair. The film originally earned a PG rating from the MPAA, though it is now unrated. It is the second film in The Blob film series.

== Plot ==
Picking up fifteen years after the events of The Blob, an oil pipeline engineer named Chester returns to his suburban Los Angeles home from the North Pole, bringing with him a metal container holding a small sample of a mysterious frozen substance uncovered by a bulldozer on a job site. Not aware that the substance is a piece of the Blob from the original 1957 incident in Pennsylvania, Chester stores the substance in his home freezer prior to taking it to the laboratory to be analyzed. His wife Marianne accidentally lets it thaw when she takes the container out of the freezer and forgets about it, re-animating the Blob. It eats a fly, a kitten, Marianne, and then Chester.

Lisa, Chester and Marianne's friend, walks in to see Chester being consumed by the Blob. She escapes, but cannot get anyone to believe her, not even her boyfriend Bobby. The rapidly growing creature quietly preys upon the town, absorbing multiple people. Lisa and Bobby find themselves trapped in Bobby's truck, with the creature attempting to find a way inside. While panicking, the truck's air conditioning is accidentally switched on and the Blob retreats because of its vulnerability to cold.

After consuming dozens more people, the now-massive Blob moves on to an ice skating rink under renovation. It is finally stopped when Bobby activates the rink's ice mechanism, freezing it. While the frozen Blob is filmed by a television crew, one of the crew's lights is positioned on the ground, melting a small portion of it, which oozes toward the sheriff and envelops his feet as he is speaking on camera to a nationwide television audience.

== Cast ==
- Robert Walker as Bobby Hartford
- Gwynne Gilford as Lisa Clark
- Richard Stahl as Edward Fazio
- Richard Webb as Sheriff Jones
- Marlene Clark as Mariane Hargis
- Gerrit Graham as Joe, Ape-Suited
- J. J. Johnston as Deputy Kelly Davis
- Dick Van Patten as Scoutmaster Adleman
- Tiger Joe Marsh as Naked Turk
- Fred Smoot as Mike Pinsetter, The Repairman
- Randy Stonehill as Randy, Guitar Player / Singer
- Cindy Williams as Hippie
- Preston Hagman as Preston, Boy Scout
- Larry Norman as Blonde Teenager
- Bill Coontz as Bowling Alley Manager
- Shelley Berman as Hair Stylist
- Godfrey Cambridge as Chester Hargis
- Larry Hagman as Hobo
- Carol Lynley as Leslie
- Danny Goldman as Bearded Teenager
- Rockne Tarkington as Deputy Williams
- John Houser as Hair Stylist's Customer
- Robert N. Goodman as Henry, Security Guard
- Patrick McAllister as Al, Repairman's Assistant
- Byron Keith as Bowling Customer
- Burgess Meredith as Old Hobo
- Margie Adleman as Party Guest With Joe

== Production ==
Larry Hagman came up with the idea for a Blob sequel while relaxing in his bathtub, and immediately called his next-door neighbor, producer Jack H. Harris, persuading him to fund the film, and assuring him that "we are all going to get rich from it". Most of the cast and cameo appearances consisted of Hagman's friends and neighbors.

Principal photography started in the spring of 1971. The film was shot at various locations in California, including Diamond Bar, Pomona, and Venice. According to Hagman, the film was shot in 16 days with a budget of about $110,000. Reportedly, significant portions of the original screenplay were discarded, and numerous scenes were improvised during filming.

== Release ==
The film received a limited and staggered theatrical release, opening in some parts of the country in late summer and fall 1972 and in others during the spring and summer of 1973.

Following the success of Dallas, the film was re-released in the summer of 1981.

=== Home media ===
As Son of Blob together with The Blob, the film was released on DVD by Umbrella Entertainment in September 2011. The DVD is compatible with all region codes. Beware! The Blob was transferred to HD in its correct 1.85 ratio and released on Blu-ray by Kino Lorber on September 20, 2016.

== Reception ==
Film historians Kim R. Holston and Tom Winchester considered the film was "... Now viewed as a relic of mid- to late-hippiedom ... overall, there's some tension, and some nods to the predecessor."

== See also ==
- List of American films of 1972

== Bibliography ==
- Holston, Kim R. and Tom Winchester. Science Fiction, Fantasy and Horror Film Sequels, Series and Remakes: An Illustrated Filmography. Jefferson, North Carolina: McFarland & Company, 1997. ISBN 978-0-7864-0155-0.
