= The Swinging Teacher =

1973 American drama film

- Movie poster
- Directed by: David Feldshuh
- Written by: Kathy Fehn
- Produced by: Michael Montgomery
- Starring: Michael Montgomery; Lynn Baker; Charley McCarty; Nancy Nelson; John Pike Jr.
- Cinematography: Gene Borman
- Edited by: Ken Robinson
- Music by: Dale Menten
- Production company: Montgomery Productions
- Distributed by: World Entertainment Corp. (original); American Films Limited (re-release)
- Release date: April 25, 1973 (U.S.)
- Running time: 95 minutes
- Country: U.S.
- Language: English
- Budget: $250,000

The Swinging Teacher, also known as Just Be There and Coming Home, is a 1973 American drama film about a Vietnam War veteran's struggle to readjust to civilian life. The film was directed by David Feldshuh and starred Michael Montgomery, who also produced the film on a budget of $250,000. Originally released with a PG rating, the film gained notoriety in 1977 when it was retitled The Swinging Teacher and marketed as a sexploitation film with misleading advertising borrowed from an unrelated film.

== Plot ==
Mitch Adams (Montgomery) is a troubled Vietnam veteran who returns home to Minneapolis with plans to write a novel about his war experiences. However, he becomes temporarily sidetracked by a financially lucrative sales job at his father's pork belly business. Kathy (Baker) is his idealistic girlfriend, a teacher of small children, who struggles to maintain their relationship as he becomes increasingly absorbed in corporate life. Billy Whitefoot (Pike Jr.) is an Indian boy who ultimately helps the protagonist pursue what he truly wants.

== Cast ==
- Michael Montgomery as Mitch Adams
- Lynn Baker as Kathy
- Charley McCarty as Frank Adams
- Nancy Nelson
- John Pike Jr. as Billy Whitefoot
- Marjorie D'Aquila
- Mary Sumner

== Production ==
=== Development ===
The film was conceived by Michael Montgomery, a former stockbroker from Des Moines, Iowa, who graduated from Roosevelt High School in 1960. Montgomery formed Montgomery Productions in 1971 with his wife, Kathy Fehn, a former Miss Minnesota (1971) with a master's degree in clinical psychology.

Fehn, who had no prior screenwriting experience, learned to write the script while working at Minneapolis's Metropolitan Medical Center. Drawing on her experience counseling men in mid-life crisis groups, she developed the story about a returning Vietnam veteran torn by conflicting ideals.

=== Financing and filming ===
The Montgomerys convinced 15 wealthy investors, "culled largely from posh neighborhood telephone directories," to put up $250,000 for the independent production. Principal photography took place entirely in Minneapolis over eight weeks, with the film coming in on budget and on time.

David Feldshuh directed, with Gene Borman as cinematographer and Ken Robinson as editor. Dale Menten composed the music, which included songs written by Lynn Baker and others. The theme song "Kathy Believe Me" was released in conjunction with the picture.

== Release ==
=== Original release ===
Just Be There was originally released on April 25, 1973. The film premiered in the Minneapolis metropolitan area at several theaters, where it scored record grosses in its first week. Initial audience surveys indicated that the 12–20 age group was seeing the picture more than once.

The film expanded to additional markets in September 1973, opening at the Plaza auditoriums in Lincoln, Nebraska and Cooper's Dundee in Omaha, Nebraska. In Minneapolis, the film performed at 120 percent capacity while showing at 11 theaters simultaneously.

=== Ratings and title changes ===
The film was originally rated R under the title Coming Home before being re-rated PG as Just Be There.

=== Exploitation re-release ===
In 1977, the film was acquired by American Films Limited and retitled The Swinging Teacher. The distributor borrowed advertising artwork from New World Pictures' exploitation film The Student Teachers, leading to misleading marketing that implied the film was a sexploitation picture set in a school.

Pacific Theatres pulled the film from area houses after complaints from patrons who expected an R-rated sexploitation film but instead saw "a mild-mannered little love story" with minimal nudity and violence. The controversy led to the substitution of the actual Student Teachers film, using the same borrowed artwork. As Variety reported, many R-rated film fans "bring paperbacks, newspapers and the Racing Form to read until something interesting happens on screen" and "some managed to read all the way through" the film "while a couple of other patrons took naps."

== Reception ==
Contemporary reviews were mixed. Los Angeles Times critic Linda Gross described it as "a modest, low-budget film, obviously made with love" that "doesn't quite work, but it's a sincere effort." She praised Lynn Baker as "a lovely and natural actress" and John Pike Jr. as "earnest and endearing," while noting that Kathy Fehn's script was "dated and often bogged down in cliches" but remained "an admirable effort."

Boxoffice magazine noted that while Montgomery "might not have met with much success when the Vietnam veteran tried to convince some Hollywood veterans that he had a story to put on film," those who met him during promotional appearances in the Midwest "were impressed with him and his sincerity."

== Legacy ==
The film served as a calling card for Michael Montgomery and Kathy Fehn when they moved to Hollywood in 1975. Producer Jules Levy was impressed enough to hire them to write a comedy screenplay called "Buff." Fehn later became a successful television writer, working on Norman Lear's All That Glitters and writing 22 of the show's 65 episodes.

The film is an early treatment of post-Vietnam veteran readjustment, predating Coming Home (1978) and The Deer Hunter (1978).
