= A Thief in the Night (film) =

1972 film

- Theatrical release poster
- Directed by: Donald W. Thompson
- Written by: Jim Grant
- Produced by: Donald W. Thompson
- Starring: Patty Dunning; Mike Niday; Colleen Niday; Maryann Rachford; Thom Rachford; Duane Coller; Russell S. Doughten Jr.; Clarence Balmer
- Cinematography: John P. Leiendecker Jr.
- Edited by: Wes Phillippi
- Music by: Ralph Carmichael
- Production company: Mark IV Pictures
- Distributed by: Mark IV Pictures
- Release date: March 22, 1973
- Running time: 69 minutes
- Country: United States
- Language: English
- Budget: $68,000

A Thief in the Night is a 1973 American evangelical Christian horror film written by Jim Grant, and directed and produced by Donald W. Thompson. The film stars Patty Dunning, with Thom Rachford, Colleen Niday and Mike Niday in supporting roles. The first installment in the Thief in the Night series about the Rapture and the Tribulation, the plot is set during the near future, focusing on a young woman who, after being left behind, struggles to decide what to do in the face of the Tribulation.

Three sequels were produced: A Distant Thunder (1978), Image of the Beast (1981), and The Prodigal Planet (1983). An additional three follow-ups were planned but ultimately unproduced.

A Thief in the Night was a pioneer in Christian film, bringing elements of horror into the genre. It was one of the first films to explore dispensational rapture theology within a fictional motif. The film became one of the decade's most widely distributed films and has been highly influential in the evangelical film industry and American evangelical youth culture. It is credited with influencing the Left Behind franchise.

== Plot ==
In medias res, Patty Myers awakens to a radio broadcast announcing the disappearance of millions around the world. The radio announcer suggests this might be the rapture of the Church spoken of in the Bible. Patty, a member of a liberal church, finds that her husband, a born-again Christian, has also disappeared. The United Nations sets up an emergency government system called the United Nations Imperium of Total Emergency (UNITE) and declares that anyone who does not receive the mark of the beast identifying them with UNITE will be arrested.

Several flashbacks occur to Patty's life before the Rapture. The story begins with Patty and her two friends, who all have different destinies. Her friend Jenny considers Jesus Christ her Savior; her other friend Diane is more worldly-minded. Patty considers herself a Christian because she occasionally reads her Bible and goes to church regularly; however, her pastor is shown to be an unbeliever. She refuses to believe the warnings of her friends and family that she will go through the Great Tribulation if she does not put her faith in Christ. Meanwhile, her husband has been attending another church and has accepted Jesus. The next morning, Patty awakens to find that her husband and millions of others have suddenly disappeared.

Patty is conflicted: she refuses to trust Christ, yet she also refuses to take the Mark. She desperately tries to avoid UNITE and the Mark but is eventually captured. She escapes, but after a chase she is cornered by UNITE on a bridge and falls from the bridge to her death.

Patty awakens and realizes it has all been a dream. Her relief is short-lived when the radio announces millions of people have, in fact, disappeared. Horrified, Patty frantically searches for her husband only to find he is missing, too. Patty realizes that the Rapture has actually occurred and she has been left behind.

== Cast ==
- Patty Dunning as Patty Myers
- Mike Niday as Jim Wright
- Colleen Niday as Jenny
- Maryann Rachford as Diane Bradford
- Thom Rachford as Jerry Bradford
- Duane Coller as Duane
- Russell Doughten as Rev. Matthew Turner
- Clarence Balmer as Pastor Balmer
- Gareld L Jackson as UNITE Leader
- Herb Brown as UNITE Officer
- Herb Brown, Jr as UNITE Officer
- Betty D. Jackson as Wedding Guest

== Themes ==
The film's title is taken from 1 Thessalonians 5:2, in which Paul warns his readers that "the day of the Lord so cometh as a thief in the night."

A Thief in the Night presents a pre-tribulational dispensational futurist interpretation of Christian eschatology and the rapture popular among U.S. evangelicals, but is generally rejected by Roman Catholics, Orthodox Christians, Lutherans, and Reformed Christians. According to Dean Anderson of Christianity Today, "the film brings to life the dispensational view of Matthew 24:36-44."

Fears of globalism and big government are prominent themes in the film, with "the Antichrist...literally a branch of the United Nations claiming control over the entire world." In the film, everyone must receive the mark of the beast on their forehead or right hand in order to buy or sell. Producers used three rows of a binary number six ("0110") to represent the number 666, an interpretation of Revelation 13:11-18. The locusts from Revelation 9:1–11 with human faces, ready for battle – to torment those without the seal of God – are represented in the film as attack helicopters, taken from Christian writer Hal Lindsey's interpretation of the Revelation passage.

Casual connections to Christianity and liberal theological beliefs are depicted as insufficient forms of the faith, with Patty's born-again Christian husband being raptured and Patty, herself part of a liberal church, left behind.

In 1999, journalist Adam Davidson placed the film in the context of a shift in evangelical views on non-believers since the early 1970s, contrasting it with the then-popular Left Behind series. He argues that evangelicals went from "[not yet knowing] who they were in the American public sphere" in the 1960s and early 1970s to a "major shift in evangelical thought which allowed for political and social activism" by the late 1990s, more negative and divisive. Evangelicals, Davidson states, had previously been more separatist, with little interest in attempting to create large-scale religious, moral, and political change. He uses the A Thief in the Night as an example of this former approach, with its compassionate view towards unbelievers: "This is a portrait of regular people who don't know what to do and happen to make the wrong choice". In contrast, Left Behind, he contends, has a contemptuous and triumphant view of non-Christians and their suffering in the end times that he sees as symptomatic of a larger change in evangelicalism.

Media critic and scholar Lynn Schofield Clark draws parallels between A Thief in the Night with the tradition of eighteenth century minister Jonathan Edwards, who focused on spiritual anxieties about the dangers of divine judgment, as Clark points out that Thief invoke fear for the purpose of evangelism.

== Production ==
=== Background ===
In 1972, Iowa-based filmmakers Russell Doughten and Donald W. Thompson formed Mark IV Pictures to produce A Thief in the Night. The two had met through their work for Paramount Pictures. Thompson, a newly born-again Christian, had been working in radio and produced television programs for Paramount. Doughten, also Christian, had worked with Good News Productions on The Blob in 1958, and had produced B movies in Iowa through his production company Heartland Productions, which he sold to Paramount and Crown International. The decline of B movies led Doughten to turn toward the Christian market, in part to use film for evangelistic purposes. In order to get enough money to produce the film, Doughten mortgaged his home. The film's actors had little to no previous professional acting experience.

=== Filming ===
Principal photography took place entirely on location in Iowa, with scenes being shot in Carlisle, the Iowa State Fair, and at Red Rock Dam.

=== Music ===
The film's score was arranged by contemporary Christian music pioneer Ralph Carmichael. The film's title track "I Wish We'd All Been Ready", composed by singer and musician Larry Norman, is performed in the film by The Fishmarket Combo, a band made up of local Young Life student volunteers. The song went on to become the anthem of the Jesus movement.

=== Influences ===
Christian writer Hal Lindsey's 1970 non-fiction book The Late Great Planet Earth was an influence on the film and its Rapture depictions; Thief has been described as complementing Lindsey's book.

== Reception ==
Produced on a $68,000 budget, A Thief in the Night earned an estimated $4.2 million during its first decade of release, the majority of which came from audience donations. The film was one of the 1970s' most widely distributed films. Scholars Terry Lindvall and Andrew Quicke write that "local film libraries stocked as many as fifteen prints of the film in order to keep up with the demand"; the film reached $1 million in rental revenue.

With A Thief in the Night becoming a popular film rental among churches—some of whom showed it multiple times a year at evangelistic events—a nonprofit organization was soon set up to provide copies for evangelists, including dubbing the film into other languages. The film was also broadcast on television beginning in the 1970s, with Christian groups and churches providing advertising and running phone lines to minister to viewers. In 1989, historian of religion Randall Balmer wrote that producer Doughten estimated that 100 million people had seen the film. More recently, Dean Anderson writing for Christianity Today says it has been seen by an estimated 300 million. Christian Bookstore Journal listed it as the top-selling Christian video from 1990 to 1995. Thompson, the film's director, claimed it had an impact of around 4,000,000 conversions to Christianity.

== Legacy ==
A pioneer in the genre of Christian film, Thief brought rock music and elements of horror to a genre then-dominated by family-friendly evangelicalism, using elements from the horror film toolbox to frighten viewers. The film has been described by religion scholar Timothy Beal as having "tremendous influence on the emergence of evangelical horror", and aspects of Thief, such as UNITE and the zombie-like characters who have taken the mark, draw parallels to Night of the Living Dead.

The film was "one of the first films to take on fundamentalist apocalyptic narratives within a fictional motif."Balmer has stated that "It is only a slight exaggeration to say that A Thief in the Night affected the evangelical film industry the way that sound or color affected Hollywood." In 2010, film scholar Heather Hendershot wrote, "Today, many teen evangelicals have not seen A Thief in the Night, but virtually every evangelical over thirty I've talked to is familiar with it, and most have seen it... I have found that A Thief in the Night is the only evangelical film that viewers cite directly and repeatedly as provoking a conversion experience."

It has been described as traumatic for children, who comprised a significant percentage of its original audience, and criticized for using scare tactics to produce religious conversions. A prayer to ask Jesus into one's heart depicted in the film serves as a template for viewers. According to Hendershot, "Evangelicals who grew up in the 1970s or early 1980s often cite Thief as a source of childhood terror." This is partly due to depictions in the film of characters who believe themselves to be saved but are not, and are instead left behind. The film has been mentioned in online discourse of Rapture anxiety. One filmmaker has commented, "Thanks to this film whole generations of impressionable pre-teen Christian girls now worry every time their mothers take longer than usual to return from shopping". Musician Marilyn Manson has spoken about experiencing fear of having missed the rapture after having seen the movie as a child.

A quarter century later, the authors of the Left Behind franchise have acknowledged their debt to Thief. The title Left Behind echoes the refrain of Norman's theme song for A Thief in the Night, "I Wish We'd All Been Ready": "There's no time to change your mind, the Son has come and you've been left behind."

== Sequels ==
- A Distant Thunder (1978)
- Image of the Beast (1981)
- The Prodigal Planet (1983)

== See also ==
- Apocalypticism
- Apocalyptic and post-apocalyptic fiction
- Criticism of the United Nations
- United Nations in popular culture

== Bibliography ==
- Albright, Brian (2012). Regional Horror Films, 1958-1990: A State-by-State Guide with Interviews. McFarland & Company. ISBN 978-0-7864-7227-7.
- Anderson, Dean A. (March 7, 2012). "The original "Left Behind"". Christianity Today. Archived from the original on April 16, 2012.
- Balmer, Randall (2002). Encyclopedia of Evangelicalism. Louisville, KY: Westminster John Knox Press. ISBN 0-664-22409-1.
- Balmer, Randall (2014). Mine Eyes Have Seen the Glory: A Journey Into the Evangelical Subculture in America. Oxford University Press. ISBN 978-0-19-936046-8.
- Beal, Timothy (September 21, 2023). "The Rise and Fall of Evangelical Protestant Apocalyptic Horror: From A Thief in the Night to Left Behind and Beyond". In Gastón, Espinosa; Redling, Erik; Stevens, Jason (eds.). Protestants on Screen: Religion, Politics and Aesthetics in European and American Movies (Online ed.). New York: Oxford Academic. pp. 281–292. doi:10.1093/oso/9780190058906.003.0018. ISBN 978-0-19-005890-6.
- Bigalke, Ron J. Jr., ed. (2003). Revelation Hoofbeats. Xulon Press. ISBN 978-1591608745.
- Burton, Tara Isabella (December 13, 2017). "#RaptureAnxiety calls out evangelicals' toxic obsession with the end times". Vox.
- Clark, Lynn Schofield (2005). "Angels, Aliens, and the Dark Side of Evangelicalism". From Angels to Aliens: Teenagers, the Media, and the Supernatural. Oxford Academic. pp. 24–45. doi:10.1093/acprof:oso/9780195300239.003.0002. ISBN 0-19-515609-9.
- Coniaris, Anthony M. (September 12, 2005), The Rapture: Why the Orthodox Don't Preach It, Light & Life Publishing, archived from the original on November 9, 2012
- Davidson, Adam (April 8, 1999). "The Mean Spirit". Feed Magazine. Archived from the original on June 14, 2000.
- Edwards, Jonathan J. (2015). Superchurch: The Rhetoric and Politics of American Fundamentalism. Michigan State University Press. ISBN 978-1-62895-170-7.
- Fleming, Matthew Ian (October 1, 2024). The End Is the Beginning: Revelation, Hope, and the Love That Lit the Stars. Broadleaf Books. p. 135. ISBN 978-1-5064-9705-1.
- Gribben, Crawford (2011). "The Dominance of Evangelical Millennialism, 1970–2000". Evangelical Millennialism in the Trans-Atlantic world, 1500–2000. Basingstoke: Palgrave Macmillan. ISBN 978-0-230-30461-1.
- Guinan, Michael D. (October 2005), "Raptured or Not? A Catholic Understanding", archived from the original on February 26, 2014
- Hendershot, Heather (2010). Shaking the World for Jesus, Media and Conservative Evangelical Culture. University of Chicago Press. ISBN 978-0-226-32679-5.
- Knepper, Marty; Lawrence, John (2014). The Book of Iowa Films. Lulu.com. ISBN 978-0-9904289-1-6.
- Lindvall, Terry; Quicke, Andrew (2011). "Mark IV and Apocalyptic Film". Celluloid Sermons. New York University Press. doi:10.18574/nyu/9780814753248.003.0007. ISBN 978-0-8147-6535-7.
- Mollett, Margaret (2014). "Telescopic Reiteration". Religion & Theology. 21 (3–4): 401–420. doi:10.1163/15743012-02103009. ISSN 1023-0807.
- Schwertley, Brian M. (1999), Is the Pretribulation Rapture Biblical?, Reformed Online, archived from the original on March 11, 2013
- "Iowa's 'A Thief in the Night': Not Just a Horror Flick". Iowa Public Radio. December 13, 2012. Archived from the original on May 7, 2021.
