= A Thief in the Night =

A Thief in the Night may refer to:

== Film and television ==
- A Thief in the Night, a 1913 American film directed by George Terwilliger
- A Thief in the Night (film series), an American film series
  - A Thief in the Night (film), a 1972 American film, the first installment in the film series
- "Thief in the Night", an episode of the television series The Transformers

== Literature ==
- A Thief in the Night (short story collection), 1905, by E. W. Hornung
- Thief in the Night, a 1961 book by William Sears
- A Thief in the Night (Cornwell book), a 1989 book by John Cornwell

== Music ==
- Thief in the Night (album), 1985, by George Duke
- "Thief in the Night" (song), 2020, by Rod Wave
- "Thief in the Night", a song by Cliff Richard from his 1982 album Now You See Me, Now You Don't
- "Thief in the Night", a song by the Rolling Stones from their 1997 album Bridges to Babylon
- "Thief in the Night", a song by Craig David from his 2005 album The Story Goes...
- "Thief in the Night", a song by Coi Leray on her 2022 album Trendsetter
- "Thief in the Night", a song by Kiss on their 1987 album Crazy Nights
