= The Notorious Mr. Monks =

1958 film

- Directed by: Joseph Kane
- Written by: Paul Fix; Richard C. Sarafian
- Produced by: Rudy Ralston
- Starring: Vera Ralston; Don Kelly; Paul Fix
- Cinematography: Jack A. Marta
- Edited by: Frederic Knudtson
- Music by: Jerry Roberts
- Production company: Ventura Pictures Corporation
- Distributed by: Republic Pictures
- Release date: February 28, 1958
- Running time: 70 minutes
- Country: United States
- Language: English

The Notorious Mr. Monks is a 1958 American drama film directed by Joseph Kane and starring Vera Ralston, Don Kelly and Paul Fix.

The film's art direction was by Ralph Oberg.

== Plot ==
In central California, hitchhiker Dan Flynn comes across drunken Ben Monks, passed out at the wheel of his parked car. While Dan is combing through Ben's wallet to locate his address, Chip Klamp drives by and, after accusing Dan of planning to rob Ben, proclaims that Ben is "a bad man" and drives away. Dan drives Ben home, where Ben's wife Angela invites him in. Angie, who married the much older Ben because he promised her there was millions of dollars' worth of oil on his farm, has grown weary of his alcoholism and abusiveness. Attracted to Dan, she offers him a job on the farm, and with no other prospects, he accepts. In the morning, Ben gruffly negotiates a low wage for Dan, and over the next days pushes him to work long hours.

One night, after Angie informs Dan about the oil, he is about to kiss her when Ben drives up. Two weeks go by during which Dan chafes under Ben's ill-treatment. One afternoon, upon seeing Ben whipping his overburdened horse, Dan tries to intercede and when Ben snaps the whip on Dan's back, Dan punches him. Back at the house, Angie defends Ben as a sad old man, after which Dan lashes out at her. When he apologizes, she begs him to stay. Later, Chip, who used to date Angie, informs her that he has had his neighboring land surveyed and discovered there is no oil; he then tells Ben that Angie is having an affair with Dan. A drunken Ben drives home without realizing that young runaway Gilda Hadley is hiding in his back seat.

At the farm, when Ben accuses Angie of cheating, she retorts that he lied about the oil and calls him old, prompting him to hit her, after which he pleads with her not to leave him. Ben retreats to the barn, where he finds Gilda and agrees to hide her in the loft. Dan arrives with the veterinarian, hoping to save Ben's ailing horse, but they are too late. Ben throws a bottle at Dan, who attacks him, but their fight is cut short by the entrance of the sheriff, who is searching for Gilda. Despite the sheriff's offer to share the reward offered by her wealthy father, Ben declares that he has not seen the girl. Meanwhile, Angie visits Dan as he packs to leave. Assuming she told Ben that they were lovers, Dan rejects her advances, then returns to the barn to demand his pay from Ben. Finding Ben on the ground, Dan assumes he is passed out and takes his car, not knowing that Gilda is again hiding in it.

On the road, Gilda tells Dan that she is running away from her boyfriend, and that she dropped her locket in the Monkses' barn. Chip sees Ben's car pass and heads to the barn, where the sheriff has found Ben, dead from a head wound. Upon spotting the locket on the ground, Chip pockets it surreptitiously. That night, Gilda admits to Dan that she is fleeing to protest her father's remarriage, two years after her mother's death. Although she tries to seduce Dan, he firmly rebuffs the teenager, instead offering to help her return home. As soon as they stop, however, Dan is spotted by the police and arrested for Ben's murder.

At the trial, Angie vouches for Dan's trustworthiness but her testimony about his fights with Ben damage Dan's case. With strong circumstantial evidence against Dan, who was the last to see Ben alive, his only hope lies in locating Gilda, who was watching from the loft and so may have seen the real killer. His lawyer is granted three days to find her, and while they wait, Chip visits Angie to demand her attentions. She throws him out, and after he drops his wallet, she discovers the locket inside and brings it to Dan's lawyer.

Soon after, Gilda turns herself in and takes the witness stand, where she recounts what happened the night Ben died: After the other men leave, Ben climbs into the loft and tries to assault Gilda. In self-defense, she pushes him to the ground, and thinking he is merely unconscious, flees to his car. After exhibiting Gilda's locket as evidence of her presence in the barn, Dan's lawyer asks for more time to uncover the murder weapon, and soon a bloody anvil is found buried in the hay in the barn. The judge rules that the death occurred accidentally when Ben fell from the loft and hit his head on the anvil, and Dan is freed. As Chip is brought before the judge to be punished for withholding evidence, Gilda's father offers Dan a job in Los Angeles and Gilda hugs Dan goodbye. As he is leaving, Dan hears his lawyer thank Angie for her help, and he tells her she is a "swell gal." Although Angie is in love with Dan, she bravely bids him goodbye.

== Cast ==
- Vera Ralston as Angela Monks
- Don Kelly as Dan Flynn
- Paul Fix as Benjamin Monks
- Leo Gordon as Chip Klamp
- Luana Anders as Gilda Hadley
- Tom Brown as Payson, Defense Attorney
- Lyle Talbot as Leonardo, Prosecuting Attorney
- Emory Parnell as Sheriff Cobus Anders
- Fuzzy Knight as Tom
- Hank Worden as Pete
- Grandon Rhodes as Mr. Hadley

Unbilled

- Wheaton Chambers as Coroner
- Rory Mallinson as Veterinarian
- Jason Robards Sr. as Judge
- Olan Soule as Court Clerk
- Herb Vigran as Bartender

== See also ==
- List of American films of 1958

== Bibliography ==
- Brian Hannan. The Making of the Magnificent Seven: Behind the Scenes of the Pivotal Western. McFarland, 2015.
