= Donald W. Thompson =

American film director (1937–2019)

Donald Whitney Thompson
- Born: August 18, 1937; Hornell, New York, U.S.
- Died: July 17, 2019 (aged 81); Iowa, U.S.
- Occupations: Film director, producer and screenwriter
- Years active: 1959–1993

Donald Whitney Thompson (August 18, 1937 – July 17, 2019) was an American film director, producer and screenwriter of Christian films. He was best known for the evangelical Christian film series A Thief in the Night about the Rapture and Tribulation.

== Life and career ==
Thompson was born in Hornell, New York. He graduated from Hamburg Central High School in 1956.

Upon graduating from high school, Thompson joined the Air Force where he served as a motion picture editorial specialist, director and producer. He moved to Des Moines in 1967 to write a series of movies for General Motors. In 1968, he married his wife, Beverly. For a time, he made television programs for Paramount Pictures.

In 1972, Thompson, a newly born again Christian, partnered with Russell Doughten to form the Christian film company Mark IV Pictures. Thompson wrote and directed 12 feature-length motion pictures, including the prophecy series that began with A Thief in the Night. According to film scholar Heather Hendershot,

"It would be hard to overstate the influence of Thompson's films on evangelical culture. Today, many teen evangelicals have not seen A Thief in the Night, but virtually every evangelical over thirty I've talked to is familiar with it, and most have seen it."

After twelve years and twelve pictures together, a disagreement over management and distribution forced Thompson out of Mark IV in 1984. Doughten retained Mark IV Pictures, while Thompson signed on with American Media in Des Moines.

The Christian and secular film industries alike have praised Thompson's work. Harry Bristow of the Christian Film Distributors Association calls him "the finest director in the industry."

Thompson also spent time as a radio disk jockey at KRNT in Des Moines, and did a Christian radio broadcast on KWKY in Des Moines.

He died in 2019 in Iowa.

== Filmography ==
Year	Title	Notes
1969	Candle in the Wind (TV movie)	Producer, director
1972	A Thief in the Night	Producer, director, writer (story)
1974	The Enemy	Director
1974	Blood on the Mountain	Producer, director, writer (screenplay/story)
1975	Survival	Producer, director, writer (story/screenplay)
1976	A Stranger in My Forest	Producer, director, writer (screenplay)
1977	All the King's Horses	Director, writer
1978	A Distant Thunder	Producer, director, writer (screenplay/story)
1979	Paradise Trail	Producer, director, writer (screenplay)
1980	Heaven's Heroes	Producer, director, writer (screenplay)
1980	Image of the Beast	Producer, director, writer (screenplay/story)
1981	Home Safe	Director, writer
1982	Face in the Mirror	Actor
1983	The Prodigal Planet	Producer, director, writer (screenplay/story)
1984	The Shepherd	Producer, director, writer (original story)
1986	The Miracle Man	International Silver Screen Award, New York Times Film Critics' Award
1987	Life Flight: The Movie	Producer, director, writer (screenplay/story)
1993	Alone in the Dark (Short)	Producer, director
