= Religious trauma syndrome =

Lingering symptoms of controlling belief systems

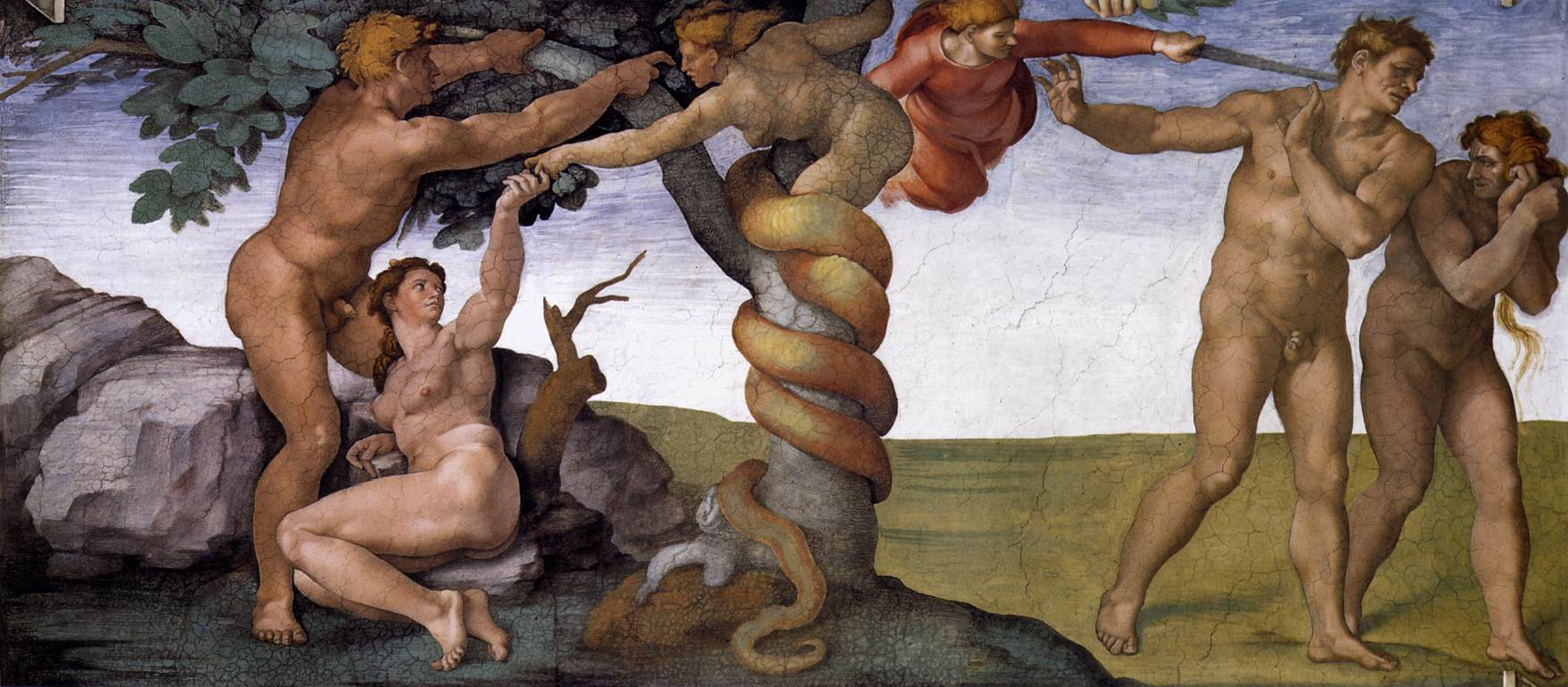

Religious trauma syndrome (RTS) is classified as a set of symptoms, ranging in severity, experienced by those who have participated in or left behind authoritarian, dogmatic, and controlling religious groups and belief systems. It is not present in the Diagnostic and Statistical Manual of Mental Disorders (DSM-5) or the ICD-10 as a diagnosable condition, but is included in Other Conditions That May Be a Focus of Clinical Attention. Symptoms include cognitive, affective, functional, and social/cultural issues as well as developmental delays.

RTS occurs in response to two-fold trauma: first the prolonged abuse of indoctrination by a controlling religious community, and second the act of leaving the controlling religious community. RTS has developed its own heuristic collection of symptoms informed by psychological theories of trauma originating in PTSD, C-PTSD and betrayal trauma theory (which highlight shattered trust and worldview loss) taking relational and social context into account when approaching further research and treatment.

The term "religious trauma syndrome" was coined in 2011 by psychologist Marlene Winell in an article for the British Association for Behavioural and Cognitive Psychotherapies, though the phenomenon was recognized long before that. The term has circulated among psychotherapists, former fundamentalists, and others recovering from religious indoctrination. Winell explains the need for a label and the benefits of naming the symptoms encompassed by RTS as similar to naming anorexia as a disorder: the label can lessen shame and isolation for survivors while promoting diagnosis, treatment, and training for professionals who work with those suffering from the condition.

RTS arises in contexts where individuals are taught they are inherently flawed and unsafe, frequently through doctrines like original sin and eternal punishment, and controlled by fear-based teachings and threats of damnation. Symptoms span cognitive confusion, anxiety, depression, sexual dysfunction, substance abuse, social isolation, and developmental delays caused by restricted critical thinking and information control. Leaving such communities can itself be traumatic, as it often involves losing social support, identity, and meaning while facing institutional betrayal and hostility from family and former friends who remain in the religious institution. RTS disproportionately affects marginalized groups, such as LGBTQ individuals pressured to suppress their identities. Treatment is trauma-informed and holistic, addressing cognitive, emotional, functional, and social recovery through critical thinking development, somatic healing, rebuilding identity, forming supportive communities, and processing grief. Growing awareness, research initiatives, and advocacy—including Religious Trauma Day in Sweden—aim to destigmatize RTS, deepen understanding of its mechanisms, and promote recovery.

== Symptoms ==
As symptoms of religious trauma syndrome, psychologists have recognized dysfunctions that vary in number and severity from person to person.

- Cognitive: Confusion, difficulty with decision-making and critical thinking, dissociation, identity confusion
- Affective: Anxiety, panic attacks, depression, suicidal ideation, anger, grief, guilt, loneliness, lack of meaning
- Functional: Sleep and eating disorders, nightmares, sexual dysfunction, substance abuse, somatization
- Social/cultural: Rupture of family and social network, employment issues, financial stress, problems acculturating into society, interpersonal dysfunction
- Developmental delay: emotional, intellectual, social, and sexual immaturity resulting from the control of information and discouragement of critical thinking within the religious environment.

Religious trauma has also been linked to severe results such as suicide and homicide.

== How RTS develops ==
=== Membership ===
RTS begins in toxic religious environments centered around two basic narratives: "You are not okay" and "You are not safe." These ideas are often enforced by theology such as the doctrines of original sin and hell.

The development of RTS can be compared to the development of complex PTSD (C-PTSD), defined as a psychological disorder that can develop in response to prolonged, repeated experience of interpersonal trauma in a context in which the individual has little or no chance of escape. Symptoms of RTS are a natural response to the perceived existence of a violent, all-powerful God who finds humans inherently defective, along with regular exposure to religious leaders who use the threat of eternal death, unredeemable life, demon possession and many other frightening ideas to control religious devotion and the submission of group members.

Members of the LGBTQIA+ community are at particular risk of RTS and C-PTSD as they attempt, over an extended period of time, to alter their sexual orientation and gender identity to fit the expectations of authoritarian religious communities. The process of attempting to alter one's orientation can create emotionally abusive thought patterns that are prone to exacerbate the C-PTSD-like symptoms of RTS. Chronically living in fear of eternal damnation and lifelong separation from loved ones and religious communities if they fail to comply with sexual identity restrictions can induce long-term symptoms of RTS.

=== Leaving ===
Leaving a controlling religious community, while often experienced as liberating and exciting, can be experienced as a major traumatic event. Religious communities often serve as the foundation for individuals' lives, providing social support, a coherent worldview, a sense of meaning and purpose, and social and emotional satisfaction. Leaving behind all those resources goes beyond a significant loss; it calls on the individual to completely reconstruct their reality, often while newly isolated from the help and support of family and friends who stay in the religion.

In addition, when violent or threatening theology, such as a belief in hell, divine punishment, demons, and an evil "outside world", have been incorporated into the basic structure of an individual's worldview, the threats of engaging the outside world instead of remaining in the safe bubble of the controlling religious community can induce further anxiety.

As individuals identify the harm they are experiencing in authoritarian religious settings, their concerns may be minimized by the religious group itself, but they can also be compounded by society's investment in positive views of religion. Institutional betrayal, first at the hands of beloved religious communities, second at the hands of a world that upholds the utility of religion rather than the experiences of religious abuse survivors, can make symptoms of RTS worse. People leaving religion can experience extreme hostility from their former co-religionists.

== Antecedents to RTS ==
The development of RTS as a diagnosable and treatable set of symptoms relies on several psychological theories that provide an academic framework with which to understand it.

=== PTSD ===
Like all iterations of trauma, the development of RTS is informed by PTSD, defined in DSM V as a mental disorder that can develop after a person is exposed to a traumatic event, such as sexual assault, warfare, traffic collisions, child abuse, or other threats on a person's life. These events can be personally experienced, observed, or imagined. The important element is the perception of life-threatening danger. In the case of RTS, a person can be traumatized by images of burning hellfire; fundamentalist groups are noted for using terrifying stories to indoctrinate children.

The experience of leaving one's faith can be an event that takes place quickly or over a period of time. Because of the overall intensity and major impact of the event, it can be compared with other events that cause PTSD. Key symptoms of PTSD are re-experiencing (flashbacks, nightmares), avoidance (staying away from places, things, and thoughts that are reminders), arousal and reactivity, and cognition and mood disturbances. These symptoms are also true for many experiencing religious trauma.

=== Complex PTSD ===
Complex PTSD is a closely related disorder that refers to repeated trauma over months or years, rather than a one-time event. Any type of long-term trauma can lead to C-PTSD. The term C-PTSD was originated by Judith Herman, who outlines the history of trauma as a concept in the psychological world along with a three-stage approach for recovery (safety, remembrance and mourning, and reconnection). Herman outlines the importance of naming and diagnosing trauma to aid recovery, further legitimizing the need for defining RTS as resulting from specifically religious experiences. Herman also describes C-PTSD with the traumatic complications of surviving captivity. This is a diagnosis comparable to RTS, in which RTS occurs in response to perceived captivity (see #How RTS develops) rather than physical reality.

The symptoms of C-PTSD include those of PTSD plus lack of emotional regulation, disassociation, negative self-perception, relationship issues, and loss of meaning comparable to RTS. Traumatologist Pete Walker sees attachment disorder as one of the key symptoms of Complex PTSD. He describes it as the result of growing up with primary caretakers who were regularly experienced as dangerous. He explains that recurring abuse and neglect habituates children to living in fear and sympathetic nervous system arousal.

=== Betrayal trauma and shattered assumptions theory ===
While the traditional paradigm defining PTSD focuses on fear response to trauma and emphasizes corrective emotional processing as treatment, RTS may be better understood as a set of symptoms comparable to betrayal trauma informed by shattered assumptions theory. Betrayal trauma adds a fourth assumption ("people are trustworthy and worth relating to") to Janoff-Bulman's original three: (the overall benevolence of the world, the meaningfulness of the world, and self worth). Betrayal trauma theory acknowledges that victims unconsciously keep themselves from becoming aware of betrayal in order to keep from shattering that fourth basic assumption, the loss of which would be traumatic.

Religious trauma can be compared to betrayal trauma because of the trust placed in authoritarian communities and religious leaders which causes harm to individuals. Betrayal trauma theory also acknowledges the power of shattered assumptions to cause trauma. With RTS, individuals are not only experiencing betrayal from family, religious community, and trusted faith leaders, they are also experiencing a shattered faith. The potential extremity of feelings in relation to losing one's worldview while also losing emotional and social support to get through any given crisis can cause further trauma.

While fear paradigms tend to focus on treating symptoms of trauma through exposure therapy and attention to emotional regulation, betrayal trauma theory looks at the social context in which the betrayal occurred, placing the pathology in the traumatic event rather than the individual. This affects treatment approaches and also informs the treatment for RTS.

=== Religious harm and trauma ===
The psychological harm that can be caused by authoritarian religion has been addressed by authors prior to the naming of the religious trauma syndrome. These writings have included work by psychologists and therapists (Tarico, Ray, Winell, Kramer & Alstad, Hassan, Cohen, Watters, Greven, Moyers), and many memoirs from former believers, including former pastors (Babinski, Loftus, Barker, DeWitt). The work of cult specialist Steven Hassan applies to any authoritarian group that applies "undue influence". Journalist Janet Heimlich, in her research on child maltreatment in religious communities, identified the most damaging groups as having a Bible-belief system that creates an authoritarian, isolative, threat-based model of reality.

The specific semi-medical metaphors of religion as a memetic virus or of "God as a virus" have gained some attention.

== Related empirical research ==
A study of male Vietnam combat veterans with penetrating traumatic brain injuries found that lesions in the prefrontal cortex (PFC), particularly the ventromedial (vmPFC) and dorsolateral (dlPFC) regions, influence adherence to religious fundamentalism. Individuals with vmPFC damage showed higher fundamentalism scores, while dlPFC lesions indirectly increased fundamentalist beliefs by reducing cognitive flexibility and trait openness. The findings suggest that rigid adherence to religious doctrine is partly supported by PFC-mediated cognitive processes, with fundamentalist thinking reflecting diminished flexibility and lower openness, highlighting the role of the brain in maintaining socially reinforced beliefs.

=== Research on religious trauma ===
To date, most research on religious trauma has been qualitative research with an individualistic, experiential focus. These have been interview-based or case studies from clinical practice.

Jill Aebi-Mytton surveyed former Exclusive Brethren; they experienced higher psychological distress than the general population, primarily due to the trauma of leaving the group, with distress influenced by lost family relationships, group identity internalization, and childhood sexual abuse.

== Treatment and tasks of recovery ==
Mental health professionals, life coaches, and individuals practicing pastoral care have been developing approaches to treating RTS. While exposure therapy is not recommended, trauma-focused cognitive behavioral therapy, group therapy combined with one-on-one sessions, trauma-informed psychoeducation, trauma processing, and grief work can all be beneficial. In Winell's approach, treatment is most effective when holistic and multi-modal. That is, treatment needs to address the cognitive, affective, physiological, and relational dimensions of the person, all in a societal context.

Treatment of RTS has been influenced by modern thinking about treating trauma of all kinds. From this trauma-informed perspective, it is important to recognize individual differences and locate the actual trauma in the nervous system of the individual. According to Walker, importance elements of trauma recovery involve shrinking the inner critic, the role of grieving, and the need to be able to stay self-compassionately present to dysphoric affect.

In medicine, trauma-informed care is defined as practices that promote a culture of safety, empowerment, and healing.

Group support appears to be an effective treatment for recovery from religious trauma and numerous services have developed to offer this, including professional recovery groups, peer support groups, and online forums. These may be effective because 1) those in recovery have lost primary support systems of family and church, 2) social support is a primary human need and relevant in understanding the physiology of trauma, and the social context of treatment helps people feel less alone or at fault.

While some liberal churches offer therapy, professional therapists take the view that treatment should be in a neutral environment, and not in a religious context.

=== Tasks of recovery ===
Healing from religious trauma involves assessing each symptom area for growth and exploration:

- Cognitive tasks:
  - developing critical thinking skills
  - providing psychoeducation about RTS
  - offering decision-making frameworks
  - fostering good mental hygiene (e.g. avoiding black and white thinking or judgmentalism)
  - re-establishing a sense of personal identity
- Affective tasks:
  - exploring coping skills for emotional dysregulation
  - habitual steps for dealing with emotional flashbacks.
- Functional tasks:
  - establishing healthy sleeping and eating patterns
  - providing sex education in an effort to promote healthy sexuality
  - reconnecting with the body through somatic techniques.
- Social/cultural tasks:
  - discovering and/or establishing a community or social network outside of the controlling faith community.
  - cultivating financial stability
  - learning how to acculturate into society
  - developing interpersonal skills such as perspective-taking.

Many developmental tasks overlap with cognitive, affective, functional, and social/cultural tasks. Developmental tasks of recovery focus on recognizing developmental delay and providing necessary education in critical thinking, sexual health, mental hygiene, and socialization to allow natural human development to continue.

== Growing awareness ==
Discussion about religious trauma syndrome is becoming more widespread in the media, including major mainstream outlets and internet sources of news. Awareness is becoming global, in terms of people seeking help and in the news. Education and training on mental health within religious environments, creating inclusive environments, and safe spaces, legal protection and advocacy, advancements through research and promotion of healthier theological interpretations are key in building awareness.

While much of the work on religious trauma has centered on fundamentalist Christianity, RTS analysis has been applied to other groups such as Mormonism, Jehovah's Witnesses, Children of God, Orthodox Judaism, the Unification Church, and some fundamentalist groups in Islam. Personal journeys out of fundamentalist religion have been the subject of numerous films in addition to previously mentioned books and memoirs.

=== 24 May – Religious Trauma Day ===
Religious Trauma Day was initiated in Sweden in 2023 to draw attention to the trauma caused by growing up in or leaving a religious community. The date 24 May is symbolically chosen: it is the same day that the neo-charismatic Christian Word of Life congregation celebrated its 40th anniversary. Word of Life is a controversial congregation that, especially during the 1980s and 1990s, stood for a charismatic theology that attracted attention in the media and other Christian communities; many members left with trauma. Behind the initiative for the religious trauma day was a working group of 150 people with a background in all different types of Christian communities—from the Church of Sweden, The Salvation Army and the Pentecostal Church to Jehovah's Witnesses and The Church of Jesus Christ of Latter-day Saints, as well as a network on social media comprising over 1000 people deconstructing their faith. A petition signed by 89 people was published in Aftonbladet, Sweden's largest evening newspaper. Karin Fahlström, initiator of the theme day, who grew up in the Word of Life, was interviewed by TV4 News together with a psychologist specializing in religious trauma and the general secretary of Sweden's Christian Council. In 2024, a Swedish online conference on religious trauma was organized in collaboration with the study association Bilda. Religious Trauma Day is a recurring awareness day that has spread to the other Nordic countries.

== Further research ==
To recognize RTS, it is not necessary to say that all religion and spirituality is harmful. It appears that certain kinds of religion, typically fundamentalist and patriarchal, have both toxic teachings and toxic practices. The damage done is through these mechanisms.

In 2019, the Religious Trauma Institute was founded by therapists Laura Anderson and Brian Peck. Currently, the institute is conducting a survey on what they are calling adverse religious experiences. While this will provide a point of comparison to the research on adverse childhood experiences, there is a need for longitudinal studies to examine actual patterns of causation.

== See also ==
- Rapture anxiety – Psychological phenomenon characterized by overwhelming fear or general anxiety concerning the Rapture
- Religious abuse – Abuse administered through religion
