= United Nations in popular culture =

Popular representations of the intergovernmental organization

The United Nations (UN) has been portrayed in various works of popular culture, involving the organization, its bodies and agencies, its headquarters, peacekeeping activities, and UN workers. Modern works often portray it in a bureaucratic and sometimes ineffective light.

== Films ==
=== Early years: 1945–1960 ===
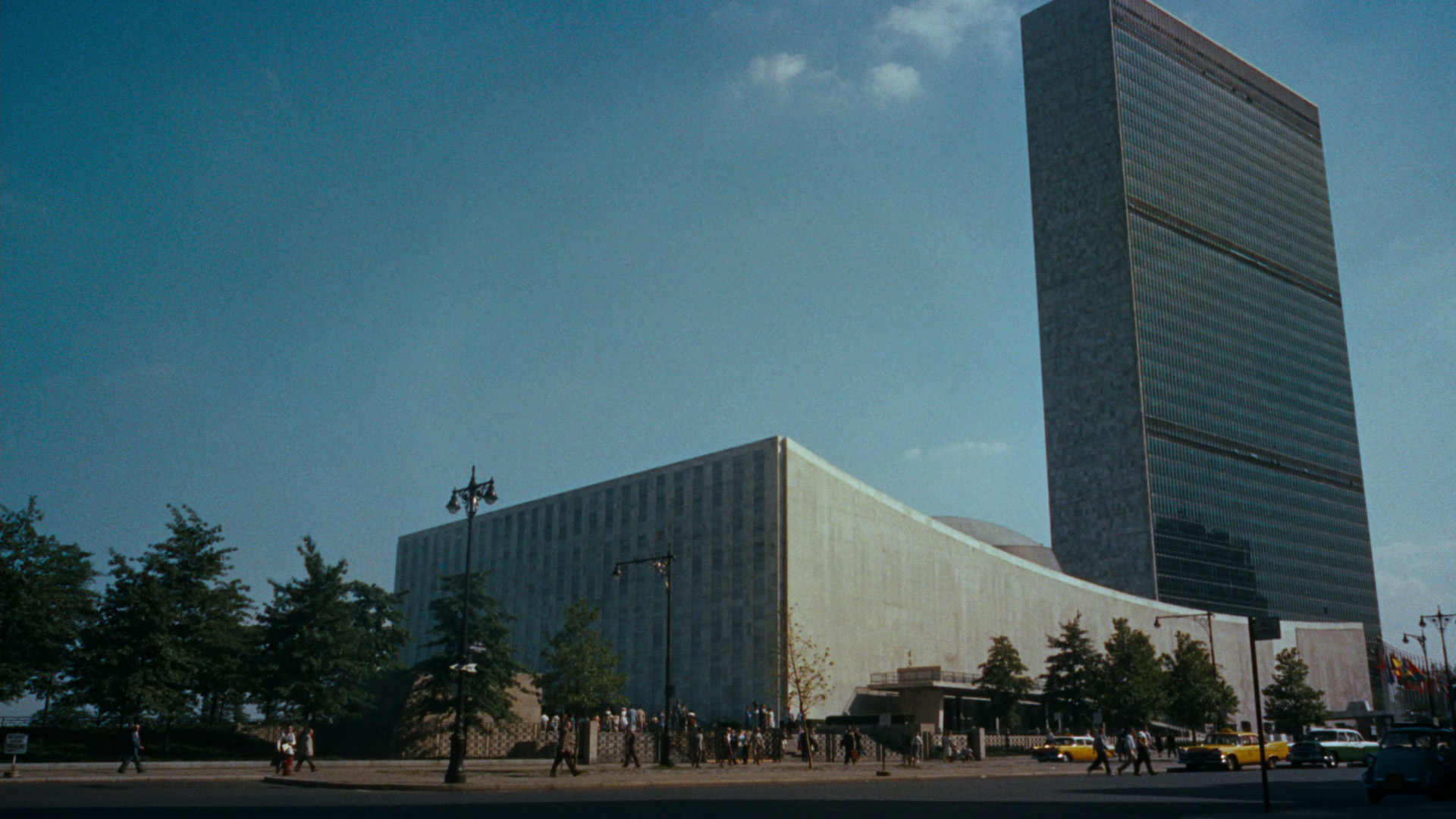
The headquarters of the UN as depicted in the 1959 film North by Northwest

Hollywood established an early relationship with the UN during the latter's inception. Meeting in San Francisco in 1945 at the United Nations Conference on International Organization, several prominent Hollywood personalities, such as Darryl F. Zanuck, lobbied the conference for "world freedom of the screen, along with radio and the press". In February 1946, the United Nations General Assembly voted to establish the United Nations Department of Public Information and its Film Division, on the grounds that the UN could not achieve its goals "unless the peoples of the world are fully informed of its aims and activities". The Film Division sought to stimulate the production of films involving the UN at "little or no cost to the organization" by giving Hollywood and European film centers ideas, research materials, and scripts for potential movies.

The early connection between the world of cinema and the UN gave rise to several films where the organization was integral to the plot. In Mister 880 (1950), Dorothy McGuire portrayed a UN interpreter at Lake Success, the temporary first home of the UN. According to the producer, her role had been switched to the one of a UN interpreter "to show the inner workings of the United Nations General Assembly". In George Pal's disaster film When Worlds Collide (1951), an emergency meeting of the UN is portrayed as the world faces destruction. This was possibly the result of UN "Hollywood ambassador" Mogens Skot-Hansen urging the producer to feature the UN convening to address the disaster, as it would have done in the real world. In Andrew Marton's Storm Over Tibet (1952), the protagonist leads a UNESCO expedition to the Himalayas to return a precious religious artifact to its rightful owners. In The Glass Wall (1953), refugee Peter Kuban seeks to avoid deportation by looking for the only person who can prove the legality of his situation. The film prominently features the aesthetic of the newly constructed glass UN building, where the film culminates, and where Kuban pleads his case and the ones of all refugees in front of an empty auditorium, with the glass wall of the UN building symbolizing both the hope and the obstacle to the protagonist's freedom. In Alfred Hitchcock's The Man Who Knew Too Much (1956), antagonists Lucy and Edward Drayton claim to be UN workers while in reality being agents of an Eastern European country.

The UN headquarters and organization were also prominently featured Alfred Hitchcock's North by Northwest (1959). In the film, protagonist Roger O. Thornhill travels to the UN building to meet with a UN official named Townsend who works for the fictional "UNIPO". Townsend is assassinated on UN premises and Thornhill is framed for the murder, setting the film in motion. Hitchcock was not allowed to film inside the UN building, and therefore the scene where Thornhill is seen traversing the lobby is a model shot in the upper part and a studio shot in the lower part. Some sources claim he was not allowed to film outside the UN building either, and that the scene featuring Cary Grant approaching the building was shot using cameras hidden in a van parked in the vicinity; however, according to assistant director Herbert Coleman, UN security interrupted the filming from the van, and so the scene outside the UN was secretly filmed from a building on the opposite side of the road. At any rate, the advent of the Cold War and rising skepticism against the UN by the United States and the Soviet Union help explain why United Nations secretary-general Dag Hammarskjöld denied permission to film on UN premises, preferring not to tie the increasingly gridlocked institution to a murder plot.

=== Pushback, gridlock, and Cold War: 1960–1991 ===
Already by the late 1950s, the Cold War and the Red Scare had left their mark on the popular representation of the United Nations in film, severely curbing it. Hollywood actress Myrna Loy, who helped found the US chapter of the UNESCO national association in 1948 and was a key internationalist figure in Hollywood circles, had to publicly protest in 1955 due to the difficulty of obtaining a passport, which she attributed to anti-UN sentiment and the accusation of being a communist fellow traveler.

The depiction of the UN in the 1960s significantly impacted the United Nations television film series. Set to be aired to an American audience, the series comprised four television films which portrayed the United Nations in a positive light and where the UN was at the center of the plot: Carol for Another Christmas (1964), Who Has Seen the Wind? (1965), Once Upon a Tractor (1965), and The Poppy Is Also a Flower (1966). Several months after the initial announcement of the series, thousands of protest letters from members of the right-wing John Birch Society flooded Xerox, the sponsor of the series, accusing the UN of being a communist front. CBS declined to participate, citing that it would violate their policy of not airing "propaganda for a particular viewpoint", and NBC imposed strict oversight on the content and postponed the release date, ultimately only leaving ABC to air the series in the United States. All four films received mixed reviews; The Poppy Is Also a Flower won one Emmy Award for best supporting actor, and the film was released to theaters in Europe. The spy story follows UN narcotics agents on a worldwide hunt for a heroin distributor.

Some superhero films of this period also feature the United Nations. In Batman (1966), the Joker, the Riddler, Penguin, and Catwoman kidnap the entirety of the United Nations Security Council. In Destroy All Monsters (1968), Godzilla, while being mind-controlled by the Kilaaks, swam to New York City and unleashed his atomic breath at the United Nations Headquarters. In Superman IV: The Quest for Peace (1987), starring Christopher Reeve, Superman enters the United Nations to make a speech denouncing nuclear weapons as a threat to peace and declaring his desire to eliminate them. The assembly subsequently erupts in applause. In a review, The Christian Science Monitor belittled the speech at the United Nations by comparing it to superheroes wanting media attention.

The influential 1970s and 1980s Christian apocalyptic horror film series A Thief in the Night, beginning with the 1973 film of the same name, prominently features the United Nations. After Jesus Christ raptures all born-again Christians, the UN—a tool of the Antichrist—institutes the United Nations Imperium of Total Emergency (UNITE). UNITE forces everyone left behind, including new Christians, to take the mark of the beast or be executed. Fears of globalism and big government are prominent themes, with "the Antichrist...literally a branch of the United Nations claiming control over the entire world." Among the Christian right, particularly the Protestant right, globalism is an umbrella term which includes perceived secular aspects such as environmentalism, feminism, and socialism; it is believed to underlie the expansion of the New World Order—a prophesied enemy attempting to thwart Christianity – through organizations such as the UN, as well as the European Union and World Trade Organization.

=== Post-Cold War: 1991–present ===
The end of the Cold War was accompanied by unprecedented activity from the United Nations, ranging from reinvigorated Security Council activity to post-conflict peacebuilding.

The 2000s, in particular, saw a multiplication of films depicting the UN. Of note is the first film ever allowed to film on UN grounds, Sydney Pollack's political thriller The Interpreter (2005). The film notably casts a UN interpreter, played by Nicole Kidman, who becomes entangled in a murder plot of an African leader set to deliver a speech at the United Nations. Pollack convinced UN secretary-general Kofi Annan to allow filming to happen on weekends after a 30-minute meeting, with Annan even contributing to the script. The United Nations setting earned broadly positive reviews: Rolling Stone noted that "it's the United Nations building, pushing sixty, that turns on the charisma in its film debut — a smashing one — in The Interpreter", with Variety similarly describing the UN setting as "a spectacle to behold". Two reviews from The New York Times were more critical of the film, with A.O. Scott deploring that ethnic conflicts and geopolitical alliances were not touched upon by the film, preferring instead to limit the exposition of the UN to its architecture, and with Caryn James questioning why the UN was needed in the first place, as it adds "little except self-importance" to the film, and further pointing to "a bizarre lack of UN security". Other reviewers echoed "the lack of disappointingly slim grasp of UN life", and the fact that the movie was "so lofty as if it were made to be screened at the United Nations". The representation of the UN in the Interpreter also divides academics: French law professor Serge Sur believes that one of the facets of the UN proposed by the film is "the UN's indifference towards dictatorships", whereas for the Belgian international law professor Anne Lagerwall, the film "embodies a faith in international institutions and particularly in the United Nations, which is certainly that of Sydney Pollack".

Not all movies were granted the same access, however. Sacha Baron Cohen, producer and protagonist of the political satire The Dictator (2012), for example, declared in an interview that the UN had prevented him from filming on UN premises. According to the UN, however, a scene outside the UN featuring protestors was facilitated by the organization.

The role of the UN in the Rwandan genocide and Bosnian genocide, where the UN deployed "blue helmets" but failed to prevent the violence, has also been portrayed in several films of the 2000s. In the Oscar-winning Bosnian film No Man's Land (2001), UN peacekeepers and UN officials serve as major plot drivers, which the New York Times called a "savage portrait of nervous bureaucratic wheeling and dealing that has little regard for the lives being gambled". UN peacekeepers are also featured in the Academy-nominated Hotel Rwanda (2004), where their force withdraws in the face of escalating violence, although the UN commander's representation has been criticized as historically inaccurate. The British film Shooting Dogs (2005) similarly denounces the abandonment of Tutsi refugees by the ill-equipped, outnumbered UN peacekeepers. The Canadian war drama Shake Hands with the Devil (2007) depicts the genocide from the perspective of blue helmet Roméo Dallaire, head of the UN Assistance Mission for Rwanda. According to one reviewer, the film contrasts the impotence of Dallaire with the unused potential that the UN had in affecting the genocide and saving lives, among other actors. More recently, the Bosnian film Quo Vadis, Aida? (2020) sheds light on the trauma of a Bosnian UN translator during the Srebrenica massacre, which, according to The Intercept, portrays the "cowardice of UN commanders", among other themes.

UN field workers and peacekeepers have also increasingly become the protagonists of their own films beyond genocide. Netflix released The Siege of Jadotville (2016), a war film that depicts the Siege of Jadotville during the Congo Crisis from the perspective of an Irish peacekeeping unit engaged there. The biopic Sergio (2020), also from Netflix, follows the life of United Nations humanitarian Sérgio Vieira de Mello in East Timor and Iraq.

The UN has continued to open its locations to representation by the film industry progressively. The United Nations Office at Vienna was chosen as the location for the signature of the Sokovia Accords in Captain America: Civil War (2016), which is bombed during the signing of the Accord putting the Avengers under UN authority. The UN subsequently became the subject of several pieces exploring its role, mirroring the factions of the film. The academic-oriented international law blog Opinio Juris noted that the UN is portrayed "as a body that is able to enforce such a treaty which requires monitoring, arrests, detention, and prosecution of individuals", and where the UN is seen as "an all-encompassing executive-legislative- and law-enforcement-body – an international world government." In Black Panther (2018), the post-credits scene has the protagonist deliver a speech to the UN in Vienna in his quality of king of Wakanda, to announce the opening of his secretive nation to the world.

== Television ==
=== Documentaries ===
Documentaries about the United Nations have documented the work of individuals within the organization, the peacekeeping activities of the United Nations, or ridicule the organization. The New Zealand documentary My Year with Helen (2017) follows the unsuccessful bid of Helen Clark to become the first female UN secretary-general. Marcel Schüpbach's Carla's List (2006) similarly documents the work of female prosecutor Carla Del Ponte in bringing to justice individuals involved in war crimes and crimes against humanity in former Yugoslavia.

Paul Cowan's documentary The Peacekeepers (2006) examines UN peacekeeping in the Democratic Republic of the Congo, whereas the documentary It Stays with You: Use of Force by UN Peacekeepers in Haiti (2017) by Cahal McLaughlin and Siobhán Wills investigates civilian deaths at the hands of UN peacekeepers in Cité Soleil, Haiti, between 2004 and 2007. The documentary U.N. Me (2009) offers a critique of the United Nations through the travels of its filmmakers, who seek to expose the organization's shortcomings and scandals.

=== TV shows ===
As in films, peacekeepers play a sizeable role in depicting the United Nations in TV shows. In the miniseries Amerika (1987), the Soviet Union takes over the United States through Soviet-controlled United Nations peacekeepers. Before the show aired, UN secretary-general Javier Pérez de Cuéllar and other UN officials complained to ABC about the representation of UN peacekeepers and the use of UN emblems. The showrunners argued that it was not a contemporary representation of the UN, but one of a co-opted UN ten years in the future. UN officials later criticized the depiction of the UN as "murderers, rapists, and arsonists" and hired external legal counsel to issue seven requests for additions or removals, but ultimately decided not to take legal action to impede the airing of Amerika. The British series Warriors (1999), directed by Peter Kosminsky, is similarly centered on peacekeepers, as it follows the British peacekeeping efforts in Bosnia of the early 1990s. In Warriors, the UN is portrayed as monolithic, dedicated to neutrality, and not deviating from the peacekeeping mission's rules of engagement. Kosminsky told reporters he desired to start a debate about the responsibilities of peacekeeping, given that, in Kosminsky's opinion, British peacekeepers in Bosnia were limited to protecting humanitarian relief, and were not meant to interfere in the fighting. United Nations peacekeeping is also explored from the point of view of international criminal justice in Black Earth Rising (2018); in particular, the shortcomings of the UN peacekeeping mission in Rwanda are a subject of scrutiny.

The organs of the United Nations are also central to some TV show plots. In the American TV show The West Wing (1999–2006), the United States, where the protagonists hail from, is confronted with an impending genocide in the fictional African state of Kundu. Canadian legal scholar Amar Khoday, noting the absence of the UN Security Council in the series, wrote that "[t]he U.N., embodied by the General Assembly, is reduced to a quivering mass of indecision and effete inaction in the face of a genocide leaving the United States as the only viable entity to respond." The UN secretary-general is also represented as a powerless, begging figure. In the face of worldwide gridlock and impotence, the US decides to intervene unilaterally. In a similar inclusion of the UN in its plot, the third season of the American political drama House of Cards (2013–2018) prominently features a plan brought forward by US President Frank Underwood to the Security Council to bring peace to the Israeli–Palestinian conflict through the deployment of a UN peacekeeping mission in the Jordan Valley. The plan is opposed by Russia at the Security Council, so Underwood decides to push the issue through the General Assembly instead. The circumvention of the Security Council, the representation of the role of the UN secretary-general (who is implied to be in control of the peacekeeping operation), of African leadership in UN peacekeeping missions, and of the influence wielded by the US ambassador to the UN were criticized as inaccurate. During filming, Russia also denied a request to shoot inside Security Council chambers.

=== Animation ===
In the Japanese mecha anime series Mobile Suit Gundam Wing (1995–1996), Macross (1982–1986), and Neon Genesis Evangelion (1995–1996), the United Nations plays an important role, being depicted "either as government or supreme commander of powerful armies". In The Animatrix anime, following their planned destruction at the hands of world governments, the machines found a new state in the Middle East called Zero One, and apply for UN membership, which the Security Council soundly rejects. Following a war that sees the machines triumph over humanity, the machines detonate a nuclear weapon at the UN headquarters, wiping out humanity's dignitaries gathered to sign a peace accord with the machines.

Throughout the superhero cartoon series Young Justice (2010–2022), the Justice League is forced to deal with UN sanctions and the struggle for influence over the United Nations. The Justice League is also hindered by the election of nemesis Lex Luthor to the position of UN secretary-general.

== Literature ==
=== Novels ===
==== Science fiction ====
Science fiction novels have represented the United Nations in various forms, although this was not always the case. In 1971, for example, an American academic writing in the International Organization journal lamented that the UN and other international organizations were largely missing from science fiction, opining that it was "perhaps more from the authors' unfamiliarity with the nature and operation of such groups" than future conceptions of the UN. This analysis stands in contrast with the one of legal academic Nabil Hajjami, who wrote in 2019 that the UN has been, for half a century, a subject of fascination and of a plurality of representations by writers.

According to Hajjami, representations of the UN in sci-fi literature range from the "most cynical ultra-realism to the most committed idealism". Among the idealist interpretations, Charles Stross' Singularity Sky (2003) describes the UN as "the sole remaining island of concrete stability in a sea of pocket polities". In Kim Stanley Robinson's Blue Mars (1996), following the catastrophic rise of sea levels due to volcanic eruptions, the United Nations "rose like some aquatic phoenix out of the chaos", spearheading and coordinating the planet's emergency efforts. In Liu Cixin's The Dark Forest, the discovery of an antagonistic and belligerent alien species offers humanity the chance to band together under a unity government headed by the United Nations, with the UN progressively taking more responsibility from national governments.

According to Hajjami, several authors of the idealist wave also see the United Nations as a tool through which humankind's material and moral resources are pooled. This is the case of one of the characters of the Isaac Asimov short story Shah Guido G, who marvels at the "extraordinary miracle" that must have been witnessed by the people of the Earth when the United Nations became a world government. Similarly, in Robinson's Red Mars, one of the leaders of the expedition on Mars recalls his counterparts to their duty, stating that their will is dictated by the United Nations, which represents 10 billion people, versus the ten thousand they represent. The United Nations and international law are "how humanity in general wants to treat this planet at this time". United Nations legislation also transcends spatial distance: in Stanisław Lem's Solaris (1961), a distant planet is aware that a UN convention has banned the use of X-rays. Unsurprisingly, extraterrestrials often expect to interact with the United Nations as the supreme, unified, and legitimate polity of humanity, and are often confused about the degree of disunity and decentralization under its banner. This is the case in Stross' Singularity Sky and Bernard Werber's Third Humanity.

Realist interpretations depict the United Nations as the structure of an oppressive universalism, oftentimes the foundation for pervasive social and economic control, and the UN is defined as "alienating, oppressive and militaristic". In Joe Haldeman's The Forever War, the UN owns forty to fifty information channels, tightly regulates the world's food supply, and automatically manages worldwide social insurance from Geneva. In James S. A. Corey's the Expanse series, the UN controls Earth and Luna, while the world currency has become the UN dollar. In the Expanse, the UN represents one of the most powerful factions in the Solar system's political stage and is portrayed as a corrupt and bureaucratic regime. In other science fiction worlds, the UN rules in "authentic totalitarianism": in Pierre Bordage's sci-fi novel Les Dames Blanches, the UN adopts a law to kill newborns, and urges its states to implement capital punishment against possible contraventions. In Larry Niven's Ringworld, the United Nations has established a fertilization committee, whose scope is to determine who can become parent and how many children couples are allowed to have. Finally, in Maurice G. Dantec's Satellite Sisters, the "UN 2.0" has become an intrusive totalitarian regime regulating every aspect of the life of individuals.

A second realist depiction of a futuristic United Nations is the organization's capture by multinationals and conglomerates. This is the case in Robinson's Red Mars, where multinationals instrumentalize and puppeteer the United Nations, and in Alastair Reynolds's Janus, where powerful firms are given seats on the Security Council of the organization that succeeds the United Nations, in parallel to China's exclusion.

As an entity, the United Nations is depicted either as a superstate with humanity as its population (Philip K. Dick, The Three Stigmata of Palmer Eldritch; Cixin's Dark Forest; Werber's Third Humanity), or as a simple coordination body (Bordage's Les Dames Blanches: Cixin's Dark Forest; Stross' Singularity Sky). The latter depiction is often coupled with the organization being "only a tool at the service of state interests" and weak (René Barjavel's The Ice People; Robinson's Red Mars; Ben Bova's Millennium).

The UN's prominent organs and personalities are portrayed in science fiction novels. The General Assembly is in some novels a true legislative entity with a universal mandate, at times capable of raising armies. In Haldeman's Forever War, for example, an elite military corps is raised by the General Assembly. In others, such as in Arthur C. Clarke's Rendezvous with Rama and Barjavel's The Ice People, the General Assembly is a chaotic, ineffective performative chamber. The architecture of the Assembly also leaves characters divided, serving as admirative for some and disenchanting for other. The figure of the secretary-general also receives several representations: sometimes as the antagonist, such as in Isaac Asimov's Shah Guido G, where the figure of the secretary-general is dictatorial and hereditary, and sometimes mistaken as the representative of humanity by aliens, such as in Arthur C. Clarke's Summertime on Icarus. More often than not, the secretary-general mirrors the real world, in that they are represented as a political figure with a nationality, ranging from the idealist to the cynic.

Finally, science fiction depictions of the United Nations generally depict it as a bureaucratic or corrupt institution and underline its legal formalism. Dick, Barjavel and Dantec describe the organization as a bureaucracy. In other novels, it creates subsidiary institutions, task forces and agencies, each with its acronyms, as soon as it faces new challenges. In Dick, Bordage and Dantec's works, UN officials engage in acts of corruption, and in Haldeman's Forever War, the only way to make the organization incorruptible would be to automate it, depriving it of its humanity. Finally, the legal formalism that workers of the United Nations engage in can be found in Robert Heinlein's The Moon Is a Harsh Mistress (1966), as well as in the novels of Dick, Stross, and Clarke.

==== Other ====
Beyond science fiction, other representations of the UN have also been seen in written fiction. In Albert Cohen's Her Lover (2005), the protagonist works for the League of Nations, the predecessor of the United Nations. Romain Gary's L'Homme à la Colombe (1958), written under a pseudonym while its author was working for the French delegation to the United Nations, offers a fictional critique of the organization. More recently, Mischa Berlinski's Peacekeeping: A Novel (2016) offers, through fiction, insights into the work of UN peacekeepers (and of the organization at large) in Haiti around the time of the 2010 Haiti earthquake.

Continuing from the Christian Thief in the Night film series from the 1970s and 1980s, other apocalyptic Christian media has featured the UN as satanic enemy, including the 1990s–2000s Left Behind multimedia franchise, in which the UN is run by the Antichrist, as well as Pat Robertson's 1991 book New World Order and Hal Lindsey's 1994 book Planet Earth 2000 A.D.: Will Mankind Survive?.

=== Comic books ===
The United Nations is also a subject of a variety of portrayals in printed comics. T.H.U.N.D.E.R. Agents superheroes, for example, derive their acronym from "The Higher United Nations Defense Enforcement Reserves". In the comic book series Irredeemable (2009–2012), the United Nations collectively submits to the Plutonian, a superhero turned villain. When a UN delegate from Singapore offends the Plutonian, the latter sinks the city-state into the ocean. In the Marvel universe, Iron Man is seen giving a speech at the United Nations; later, the UN disavows the Avengers' charter.

== Video games ==
In the first-person shooter Call of Duty franchise, the United Nations appears several times. In Call of Duty: Advanced Warfare (2014), antagonist Jonathan Irons, leader of the world's largest private military company, is granted a seat at the UN Security Council. In a speech to the UN, he declares the organization obsolete due to the world having delegated its problems to him. In Call of Duty: Infinite Warfare (2016), the Earth's nations have coalesced to create the United Nations Space Alliance. A similar futuristic organization appears in Deus Ex (2000), where protagonist J.C. Denton works for the fictional United Nations Anti-Terrorist Coalition (UNATCO), a militant police force prominently featured throughout the game.

The government simulation browser game NationStates (2002–), which allows players to decide the political leaning of their countries, featured until 2008 a virtual United Nations body where player nations could approve global legislation. The in-game United Nations was rebranded to the World Assembly after the United Nations sent a cease and desist notification to the game's creator.

In the grand strategy game, Stellaris, the United Nations of Earth is a playable nation in the game.

== Music ==
The punk band United Nations, formed in 2005, received several cease and desist letters from the United Nations organization and was sued for using the same name. While the lawsuit did not achieve its goals, the band's Facebook page was shut down, its publicist resigned, and its label stopped printing the band's first album. The band later released a second album, featuring the organization's cease and desist letters on its cover.

UNRocks is a band comprising diplomats of the UN.

In September 2021, at the 76th session of the United Nations General Assembly, BTS filmed a performance video of Permission to Dance a track from their single album Butter, set inside and around the United Nations Secretariat Building.
