= Tank Battalion (film) =

- Film poster by Albert Kallis
- Directed by: Sherman A. Rose
- Written by: Richard Bernstein; George Waters
- Produced by: Richard Bernstein
- Starring: Don Kelly; Leslie Parrish; Edward G. Robinson Jr. Frank Gorshin
- Cinematography: Frederick Gately
- Edited by: Sherman A. Rose
- Music by: Richard LaSalle
- Production company: Iron Foxhole Inc. Viscount Films - Terry Moore Production
- Distributed by: American International Pictures
- Release date: July 1958
- Running time: 80 min.
- Country: United States
- Language: English

Tank Battalion (also known as Korean Attack) is a 1958 war film directed by Sherman A. Rose and starring Don Kelly, Leslie Parrish and Edward G. Robinson Jr. Four men in their tank, during the Korean War in 1951, find themselves behind enemy lines. American International Pictures originally released the film as a double feature with Hell Squad.

== Plot ==
During the Korean War, four soldiers reminisce about their past romantic adventures. One of them is currently involved with an Army nurse, another with a Eurasian bargirl. When the tank crew takes their girlfriends on a picnic, they make contact with North Korean guerillas who later try to steal medical supplies from their base.

Resuming battle with the North Koreans, their tank breaks down against a cliff. One of the men risks life and limb to sneak out and retrieve a new gear box.

== Soundtrack ==
Richard La Salle's first film score uses pieces of Debussy's Three Nocturnes For Orchestra.

== Cast ==
- Don Kelly as Sgt. Brad Dunne
- Leslie Parrish as Lt. Alice Brent (as Marjorie Helen)
- Edward G. Robinson Jr. as Cpl Corbett
- Frank Gorshin as Pfc. 'Skids' Madigan
- Regina Gleason as Lt. Norma 'Red' O'Brien
- BarBara Luna as Nikko
- Robert Paget as Pfc Danny Collins
- Mark Sheeler as Captain Caswell
- Baynes Barron as Buck the Mechanic
- Tetsu Komai as 'Egg Charlie'
- John Trigonis as Motor Pool Lieutenant
- Don Devlin as Soldier
- Troy Patterson as Soldier
- Warren Crosby as Soldier
