= Henry Felsen =

American writer

- Born: August 16, 1916; Brooklyn, New York
- Died: March 2, 1995 (aged 78)
- Occupation: Writer
- Years active: 1940 - 1977
- Notable work: Hot Rod

Henry Gregor Felsen (August 16, 1916 – March 2, 1995) was an American writer, particularly of middle grade (MG) and teen (YA) books. He wrote both under his own name and a title under the pen name of Angus Vicker.

== Biography ==
Felsen was born and attended school in Brooklyn, the son of Harry and Sabina Bedrick Felsen. He attended the University of Iowa for two years, where he met his first wife Penny, from whom he was later divorced.

He taught part-time at Drake University (1964–1969), and in 1977 left Iowa to spend his remaining years travelling. His second wife Karen Kangas survived him, as did a son (Dan) and daughter (Holly) from his first marriage, and two stepchildren.

== Career ==
After struggling financially during the Great Depression, Felsen sold nine books and hundreds of stories in his first eighteen months of full-time freelance writing in the early 1940s. After war service with the Marine Corps, during which he edited the Corps magazine Leatherneck and also wrote magazine articles while stationed in the Pacific, he returned to Iowa where he lived for most of the rest of his life.

His best-selling book was Hot Rod, one of a rodding series that also included Street Rod and Crash Club and sold about eight million copies in all. He wrote about 60 books, many of them moralistically exploring the evils of drugs, sexism and racism.

He is also credited with one screenplay, for the 1968 film Fever Heat, based on his novel of the same name which had been published under the pen name of Angus Vicker.

== Bibliography ==
- He's in Submarines Now. McBride. 1942.
- He's in the Coast Guard Now. McBride. 1942.
- Jungle Highway. E.P. Dutton & Company. 1942.
- Navy Diver. E.P. Dutton & Company. 1942.
- Struggle is Our Brother. E.P. Dutton & Company. 1942.
- Submarine Sailor. E.P. Dutton & Company. 1942.
- Vicar, Henry; Felsen, Henry Gregor (1942). The Company Owns the Tools. Westminster Press.
- Pilots All. Harper. 1943.
- Some Follow the Sea. E.P. Dutton & Company. 1943.
- Bertie Comes Through. E.P. Dutton & Company. 1947.
- Flying Correspondent. E.P. Dutton & Company. 1947.
- Bertie Takes Care. E.P. Dutton & Company. 1948.
- Bertie Makes a Break. E.P. Dutton & Company. 1949.
- Davey Logan, Interne. E.P. Dutton & Company. 1950.
- Hot Rod. E.P. Dutton & Company. 1950. ISBN 978-0-525-32245-0. Archived from the original on March 26, 2012.
- Cub Scout at Last!. Scribners. 1952.
- Two and the Town. Charles Scribner's & Sons. 1952.
- Doctor, It Tickles!. Prentice-Hall. 1953.
- Street Rod. Random House. 1953.
- Anyone for Cub Scouts?. Charles Scribner's & Sons. 1954.
- Vicker, Augus; Felsen, Henry Gregor (1954). Fever Heat. Dell. ISBN 978-0-917473-09-8.
- The Cup of Fury, AKA Rag Top. Random House. 1954. ISBN 978-0-917473-08-1.
- The Boy Who Discovered the Earth. Charles Scribner's & Sons. 1955.
- Medic Mirth. Ace Books. 1956.
- Crash Club. Random House. 1958.
- Boy Gets Car, AKA Road Rocket. Random House. 1960. ISBN 978-0-394-90976-9.
- Letters to a Teen-Age Son. Dodd, Mead & Company. 1962.
- To My Son, the Teen-Age Driver. Dodd, Mead & Company. 1964.
- Here is Your Hobby: Car Customizing. G. P. Putnam's & Sons. 1965.
- A Teen-Ager's First Car. Dodd, Mead & Company. 1966.
- Why Rustlers Never Win. Scholastic Book Service. 1966.
- To My Son in Uniform. Dodd, Mead & Company. 1967. ISBN 978-0-396-05468-9.
- The Spaceman Cometh. Perfection. 1971.
- Necktie Party, The and Some Other Comic Western Tales. Perfection. 1971.
- Why Outlaws Rue the Day, The Little Texas Stranger, Why Banks is Robbed in Texas. Perfection. 1971.
- Living With Your First Motorcycle. G. P. Putnam's & Sons. 1976. ISBN 978-0-399-60978-7.
- Can You Do It Until You Need Glasses: The Different Drug Book. Dodd, Mead & Company 1977. 1977. ISBN 978-0-396-07483-0.
