= Ami Horowitz =

American filmmaker

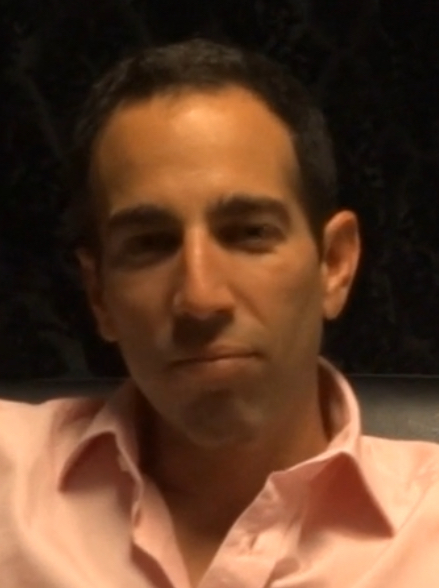
Horowitz in 2012

Ami Horowitz is an American conservative documentary filmmaker and activist. He is the writer, producer, and director of Ami on the Loose, a satirical short film series made for Fox News. Horowitz co-wrote, co-directed, and starred in the 2012 documentary U.N. Me, a critical examination of the United Nations.

Horowitz came to some prominence after the release of his 10-minute documentary Stockholm Syndrome, on the relationship between immigration and crime in Sweden. Horowitz's commentary appears to have influenced President Donald Trump's rhetoric on the same subject. Some of Horowitz's statements about Sweden in the film and in subsequent interviews were described as false by fact-checkers, news organizations, criminologists, and by Swedish authorities.

== Early life ==
A native of Los Angeles, Horowitz graduated from the University of Southern California with majors in political science and philosophy. Horowitz's mother is from Israel. He is a Modern Orthodox Jew, and spent a year at the Hebrew University of Jerusalem in Israel.

== Career ==
After graduating from USC, Horowitz managed a Democratic candidate's unsuccessful campaign for state comptroller of Maryland. Then, taking the candidate's advice to "make money and go into politics later," he went into investment banking, and spent sixteen years in that field. During that period, he worked at Lehman Brothers. Asked by Brian Lamb on C-SPAN about his political views, Horowitz described himself as "right-of-center" but "not reflexively" so.

=== Executive order against antisemitism ===
Horowitz released a video from a Middle East conference hosted by Duke University and UNC-Chapel Hill, that was largely paid for by the U.S. government. The video showed edited clips of a performance by Palestinian-Israeli rapper Tamer Nafar of a satirical song called "Mama, I fell in love with a Jew". Because of Horowitz's video, the Department of Education sued the universities and President Trump signed an executive order against antisemitism.

=== U.N. Me ===
Horowitz's film U.N. Me, released in theaters in 2012, was produced, directed, and written by Horowitz and Matthew Groff. Neil Genzlinger of The New York Times called U.N. Me "a sassy documentary that suggests the United Nations is doing more harm than good", saying "Mr. Horowitz, the on-camera gadfly, finds ways to work wit into decidedly unpleasant subject matter."

=== Short films ===
Under the titles of Ami on the Street, Ami on the Loose, and An Ami Horowitz Digital Short, Horowitz created satirical short films that have appeared on FOX News and YouTube. The films include "Do cops' lives matter?", "Do liberals even know what's in the Iran deal?", "Ferguson Protestors Call for Darren Wilson's Death", "What do you know about the IRS and ObamaCare?", and exposing "anti-Israel companies in Ireland".

==== ISIS flag at UC Berkeley ====
In one of Horowitz's videos, he acted as "an ISIS supporter" while shouting terrorist rants and waving an ISIS flag inside UC Berkeley. According to the video, most of the students ignored his "terrorist rants", but a "few gave him a thumbs-up, wished him luck and smiled". Horowitz later switched to a "Zionist tirade" and began waving an Israeli flag. The video then shows students expressing their outrage toward Israel, cursing and giving Horowitz obscene gestures. How long the videos took to create, and what edits were made is unclear, but Horowitz does appear in different outfits during the two parts of the video.

==== Portland State University students raise money for Hamas ====
In May 2016, Horowitz released a video on FoxNews.com to "see just how far America's liberal students in the Pacific Northwest were willing to take the BDS Movement (Boycott, Divestment and Sanctions Movement) against our ally, Israel". Posing as a volunteer for the faux-organization American Friends of Hamas, Horowitz said he raised several hundred dollars from students to "wipe Israel off the map". He told Fox News afterward, "Let's be clear. It's not that these kids are stupid or misinformed or ignorant—I could not have spelled it out more specifically, that we want to use this money to kill Jews".

==== Stockholm Syndrome ====
In December 2016, Horowitz's 10-minute film Stockholm Syndrome, which explores the "cultural and religious clashes between liberal Swedes and the recent influx of refugee immigrants", was released on FoxNews.com and YouTube. Filmed in September 2016 in Sweden it features what Horowitz described as "no-go zones". Horowitz said police told him that "when we're pursuing a suspect, and they cross that threshold, and there's about 30 or 40 of them in Sweden, they will not pursue". The film includes audio footage that he says is of himself being "punched, kicked and choked" by Arabic-speaking men that he was trying to film in Husby, Stockholm. on February 17, 2017, Horowitz appeared on the Fox News program Tucker Carlson Tonight to discuss the documentary; President Donald Trump referred to the interview indirectly in a speech the next day.

Some of Horowitz's statements about Sweden in the film and in subsequent interviews were described as false by fact-checkers, news organizations and criminologists as well as Swedish authorities. Two policemen who were featured in Horowitz's film said that Horowitz edited answers and questions to misrepresent them. Two cameramen involved in the project later concurred, after reviewing the raw film, that the footage had been unethically edited to misrepresent the subjects. Horowitz denies it, but refused to show the raw material.

=== 2020 presidential campaign ===
On May 8, 2019, Horowitz announced on Twitter that he was running for president of the United States in 2020, stating that he was running as a Democrat because "all their current candidates are insane" and would be soliciting $1 donations in order to qualify for the Democratic presidential primary debates.

Horowitz did not qualify for any of the Democratic presidential debates. He filed a report with the Federal Election Commission that his campaign had terminated as of July 31, 2019.
