= The Prodigal Planet =

- Directed by: Donald W. Thompson
- Written by: Russell S. Doughten Jr.; Donald W. Thompson; William Wellman Jr.
- Produced by: Peg Courter; Russell S. Doughten Jr
- Starring: William Wellman Jr.; Lynda Beatie; Terri Lynn Hall; Thom Rachford
- Cinematography: James L. Berry
- Edited by: Wes Phillippi
- Music by: Bob Jenkins
- Production company: Mark IV Pictures
- Distributed by: Mark IV Pictures
- Release date: 1983
- Running time: 127 minutes
- Country: United States
- Language: English

The Prodigal Planet is a 1983 American evangelical Christian horror film produced, directed and co-written by Donald W. Thompson. It is the fourth and final installment in the Thief in the Night series, based on an evangelical interpretation of Bible prophecy and the rise of the Antichrist.

Unlike the previous three films in the series filmed entirely in Iowa, The Prodigal Planet included filming locations in Omaha, Colorado, and New Mexico.

== Plot ==
During the final years of the Antichrist's reign, a nuclear war has devastated the earth. The Antichrist and his world government find their grip on power slowly slipping away as Jesus Christ's return draws near.

One of the lead characters from the previous film, David Michaels (played by William Wellman Jr.), is now part of a growing underground movement of Christian believers trying to stay out of the government's hands and thus escape execution. The government is using underground agents to infiltrate this movement. David's mission is to take an RV across a nuclear-devastated landscape to Albuquerque, where he will meet with other underground believers to await Jesus Christ's final return. The earth by this time is populated by doomsday people, mutants as a result of the nuclear exchanges. After rescuing one of them, Jimmy, David leads him to Jesus Christ. Jimmy later bravely dies to save the others from Jerry, and leaves Jerry their temporary captive.

Connie Wright (played by Terri Lynn Hall) is a government agent pretending to be a Christian. She rescues David from his internment at the United Nations Imperium of Total Emergency (UNITE), then tries to get David to reveal the believers' secret hideout. Along the way, they rescue Linda and her daughter, Jody. Linda is a scientific researcher, brilliant, but terrified. Jody is a spoiled brat who, after being told off by Jimmy, begins to change. She even starts to slowly accept David's preaching. The same cannot be said of Linda, who is too rational a scientist to accept David's faith. But Linda is actually evidence of divine providence, because her scientific specialty is radiation. As they travel through the war-ravaged nation, Linda's knowledge keeps them alive and provides crucial guidance. She feels guilty, though, because she was part of the team that helped create the mutant doomsday people.

David suspects Linda of being a spy, since it seems that government agents always know where they are. But Linda is the only trustworthy one: Jody is discovered to have been transmitting their position inadvertently, and Connie did so deliberately. Connie is later picked up by a senior UNITE officer (dubbed "General Goon" by David in Image of the Beast). They are soon killed as their van goes out of control and runs into a train. At the end of the movie, Jody accepts Jesus Christ as her Savior, while Linda still thinks about the matter, or at least she does not yet openly receive Jesus Christ on camera.

The movie ends with a badly wounded and sobbing Jerry in the ruins of the UNITE military base. Feeling defeated and regret for all he has done, he rips off his UNITE armband before he is killed when the base is then destroyed by explosions.

== Cast ==
- William Wellman Jr. as David Michaels
- Lynda Beatie as Linda
- Terri Lynn Hall as Connie Wright
- Thom Rachford as Jerry Bradford
- Robert Chestnut as Jimmy
- Cathy Wellman as Jodi
- Russell S. Doughten Jr. as Rev. Matthew Turner

== Production ==
=== Filming ===
Unlike the previous three films in the series that were filmed entirely in Iowa, this one included filming locations in Omaha, Colorado, and New Mexico.

== See also ==
- Nuclear weapons in popular culture
- United Nations in popular culture
