= Fever Heat =

1968 film by Russell S. Doughten

- Theatrical release poster
- Directed by: Russell S. Doughten
- Screenplay by: Henry Gregor Felsen
- Based on: novel by Felsen
- Produced by: Russell S. Doughten
- Starring: Nick Adams; Jeannine Riley; Norman Alden; Vaughn Taylor; Daxson Thomas; Robert Broyles
- Cinematography: Gary Young
- Edited by: Tom Boutross
- Music by: Jaime Mendoza-Nava
- Production company: Heartland Productions
- Distributed by: Paramount Pictures
- Release date: May 1968
- Running time: 109 minutes
- Country: United States
- Language: English

Fever Heat is a 1968 American drama film directed by Russell S. Doughten and written by Henry Gregor Felsen. The film stars Nick Adams, Jeannine Riley, Norman Alden, Vaughn Taylor, Daxson Thomas and Robert Broyles. It was released in May 1968 by Paramount Pictures.

== Plot ==
Ace Jones is a talented but hot-tempered former stock car driver who's been banned from professional racing after a dangerous incident. Drifting through a small Iowa town, he stops at a rundown garage for truck repairs and meets Sandy Richards, a young widow struggling to keep the business afloat after her husband's death in a racing accident. With the help of Sandy's brother-in-law and an eccentric mechanic named Toad, Ace gets drawn into the local dirt-track stock car racing scene.

As Ace works on cars and starts racing again on a small scale, he develops a romance with Sandy while navigating rivalries, unscrupulous competitors, and the high-stakes dangers of the track. The story builds around his efforts to turn the garage into a success, redeem himself, and confront the risks of the racing world he can't escape.

== Cast ==
- Nick Adams as Ace Jones
- Jeannine Riley as Sandy Richards
- Norman Alden as Herbert Herpgruve
- Vaughn Taylor as Toad Taplinger
- Daxson Thomas as Ronnie Richards
- Robert Broyles as Loren Peale
- Al Ruscio as Al Demarco
- Skip Nelson as Track Announcer
- Walt Reno Jr. as Makin
- Ron Foreman as Duke Ossman
- Mary Walker as Irma Peale
- Alvin Meyer as Customer
- John Doughten as Driver #1
- Art Breese as Bob Towner
- Cliff Carr as Cliff
- Matt Moro as Matt
- Lon Parsons as Chip Van
- Sharon Baum as Lois Towner
- Dwayne Bacon as Driver #2
- Robert McClelland as Driver #3
- Art Greco as Jensen

== Production ==
The screenplay was written by Henry Gregor Felsen, based on his novel of the same name originally published under the pen name Angus Vicker.

The film was shot in Dexter, Iowa.

== See also ==
- List of American films of 1968
