= Rapture anxiety =

Psychological phenomenon

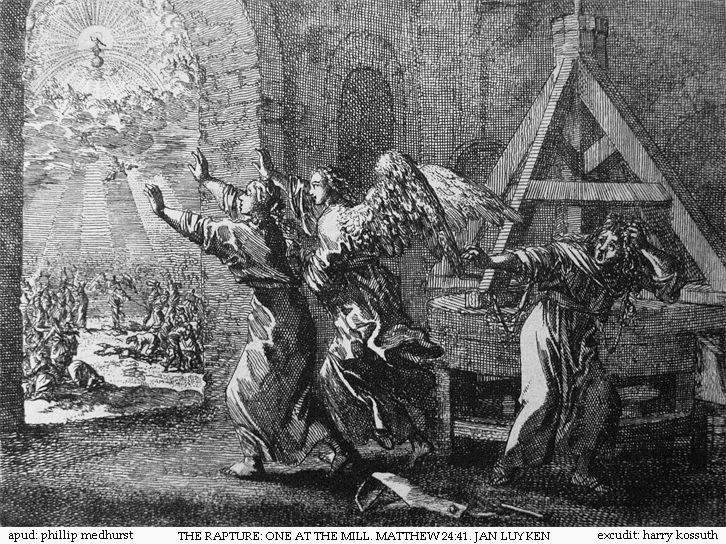
Teachings of Jesus 39 of 40. the rapture. one at the mill. Jan Luyken etching. Bowyer Bible

Rapture anxiety is a psychological phenomenon characterized by an overwhelming fear or general anxiety concerning the Rapture, an event in dispensational and premillennial Christian eschatologies where it is believed that Jesus Christ will return to Earth and raise faithful Christians into heaven before the apocalypse.

In many popular depictions of the Rapture, Christians physically rise into the sky, sometimes leaving their clothes behind. Many children raised with the concept of the rapture report having fears that they will be left behind, or that they will be raptured before being able to live their full life. This anxiety can follow many into adulthood.

== Background ==
In the Gospel of Matthew, Jesus tells his disciples that no one will know the day and time when the second coming will happen.

"But about that day or hour no one knows, not even the angels in heaven, nor the Son, but only the Father."

— Matthew 24:36

The concept of the rapture has been widely criticized. It is not accepted by either the Catholic or Eastern Orthodox Church, who purport that the calling of Christians into heaven as described in verses such as 1 Thessalonians will not be a literal, physical ascension. They also dispute the exact timing relative to the second coming when this event will happen, or if it will even be a single event at all. Furthermore, historic Protestant denominations espouse eschatological positions, such as amillennialism or postmillennialism, which also do not accept the concept of rapture.

Despite this, many children fear that because of some minor sin or transgression, they will be left behind on Earth while their loved ones enter heaven. There are numerous reports of children coming home to empty houses, and fearing that they have been condemned.

This fear may also be influenced by popular works of fiction such as the Christian book and film series Left Behind or the 1972 film A Thief in the Night, which both depict the collapse of society and suffering following the rapture. One filmmaker has commented, "Thanks to [A Thief in the Night] whole generations of impressionable pre-teen Christian girls now worry every time their mothers take longer than usual to return from shopping." Musician Marilyn Manson has spoken about experiencing fear of having missed the Rapture after watching Thief as a child.

Many who suffer from rapture anxiety are hesitant to voice their fears due to their belief that only sinners should fear judgement.

== See also ==
- List of dates predicted for apocalyptic events
- Predictions and claims for the Second Coming
- Religious trauma
- 2011 end times prediction
- Christian eschatology
