= Shoot Out at Big Sag =

1962 film

- Lobby card
- Directed by: Roger Kay
- Screenplay by: Roger Kay
- Story by: Walter Coburn
- Produced by: Andy Brennan
- Starring: Walter Brennan; Chris Robinson; Luana Patten; Les Tremayne; Virginia Gregg; Leif Erickson; Constance Ford; Don O'Kelly
- Cinematography: Lothrop B. Worth
- Edited by: Bud S. Isaacs
- Music by: Jack Cookerly; Bill Loose
- Production company: Brennan Productions
- Distributed by: Parallel Film Distributors Inc.
- Release date: 1962
- Running time: 64 minutes
- Country: USA
- Language: English

Shoot Out at Big Sag is a 1962 American Western film. It starred Walter Brennan and was made for Brennan's production company.

The film was produced by Brennan's son Andy and based on a story by Walter Coburn. It was meant to be a television pilot called Barbed Wire, and would have also starred Leif Erickson and Constance Ford. Shot in 1960, the pilot was to be called Rawhide Halo.

The pilot was eventually released as a film. In Mexico the film was titled Los Magnificos McCoy as a tie-in to Walter Brennan's American television series The Real McCoys.

== Plot ==
"Preacher" Hawker is the pawn of his bossy wife Sarah Treadway Hawker, who wants to start a range war with their neighbor Sam Barbee. It doesn't help that Preacher's daughter Hannah and Barbee's son Lee have fallen in love. Preacher hires Chan Bartholomew, a lowlife saloon owner, to ensure that the outcome is in the Hawker family's favor.

== Cast ==
- Walter Brennan as "Preacher" Hawker
- Leif Erickson as Sam Barbee
- Luana Patten as Hannah Hawker
- Chris Robinson as Lee Barbee
- Constance Ford as Goldie Bartholomew
- Virginia Gregg as Sarah Treadway Hawker
- Les Tremayne as Chan Bartholomew
- Don O'Kelly as Fargo
- Andy Brennan as Townsman
- Bill Coontz as Beale Hawker
- Hal Needham as Saloon Brawler (uncredited)
- Buddy Roosevelt as Barfly (uncredited)
