= Hell Squad (1958 film) =

- Theatrical release poster by Albert Kallis
- Directed by: Burt Topper
- Written by: Burt Topper
- Produced by: Burt Topper
- Starring: Wally Campo; Brandon Carroll
- Cinematography: Erik Daarstad; John Arthur Morrill
- Edited by: Marvin Walowitz
- Production company: Rhonda Productions
- Distributed by: AIP
- Release date: July 1958 (USA)
- Running time: 64 minutes
- Country: United States
- Language: English
- Budget: $11,500

Hell Squad is a 1958 American World War II film, produced, written and directed by Burt Topper. It was his very first film. AIP originally released the film as a double feature with Tank Battalion.

== Plot ==
During World War II, a squad of five American soldiers become lost in Tunisia and are killed one by one in fights with German units. Finally only one man, Private Russo, is left, in the midst of a mine field, together with a German officer, locked in a stalemate. Russo has water, while the German claims to have a map revealing the mine positions. So Russo agrees to swap water for the map, but the German officer tries to double-cross him.

== Main cast ==
- Wally Campo as Private Russo
- Brandon Carroll as German Officer
- Fred Gavlin as Sergeant Clemens
- Gregg Stewart as Private Nelson
- Leon Schrier as Private Roth
- Cecil Addis as Private Lippy

== Production and release ==
The film was shot in Indio, California in 1957 on 16mm. Shooting took six months and was done mostly on weekends. It cost Topper $11,500 to make.

The film was originally titled The Ground They Walk, but was retitled Hell Squad when American International Pictures bought the cinema distribution rights. It was released in July 1958 as part of a double feature with the Korean War film Tank Battalion.
