= Asking Jesus into one's heart =

Description of Christian conversion

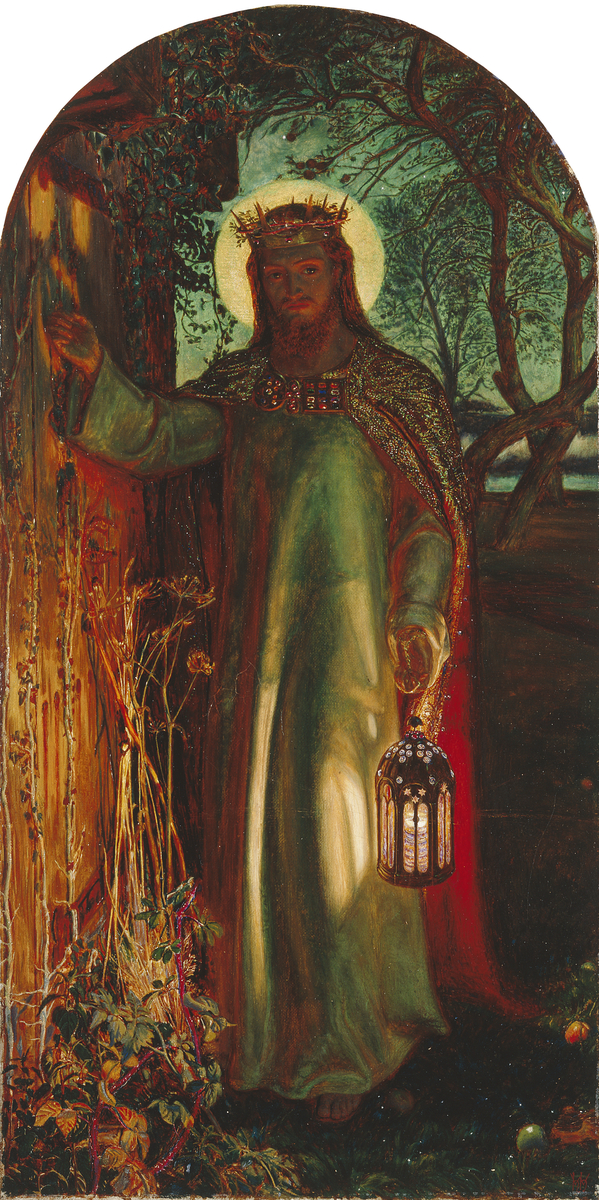
William Holman Hunt's The Light of the World is an allegory of Jesus knocking on the door of the sinner's heart.

Asking Jesus into one's heart is a description of personal conversion used in evangelicalism. It is often regarded as a component of the sinner's prayer. Paul Chitwood notes that the concept "does not occur readily before the turn of the twentieth century", but had "become the common way of expressing conversion by the mid-part of the twentieth century." The phrase does not occur in the Bible, and it has frequently been criticized.

R. Larry Moyer lists "If you want to be saved, just invite Jesus into your heart" as one of the things that God never said. Moyer suggests that Revelation 3:20 ("Behold, I stand at the door, and knock: if any man hear my voice, and open the door, I will come in to him, and will sup with him, and he with me", KJV) is the only verse that could be considered to support the concept, but notes that the verse is addressed to Christians rather than non-Christians. Moyer argues that the phrase "often conveys the idea that one is saved by saying a prayer instead of trusting Christ."

In his book Stop Asking Jesus Into Your Heart: How to Know for Sure You Are Saved, J. D. Greear argues that asking Jesus into one's heart is not the same as believing the gospel. Greear relates how he asked Jesus into his heart several thousand times "until he came to put his faith in the truth of the gospel instead."

Writing from a Calvinist perspective, Michael Horton regards asking Jesus into one's heart as a "popular misconception of the gospel", on the basis that "it is the objective work of Christ outside of us" that "makes the gospel truly Good News". Horton goes on to argue that "salvation by asking Jesus into your heart typically assumes that the Good News is merely something that God offers, but the hearer is then commanded to do something—however small—in order to actually make this salvation effective."

== In media ==
Asking Jesus into one's heart is depicted in the 1970s evangelical Christian horror film A Thief in the Night, serving as a template for viewers.
