= The Hostage (1967 film) =

1966 film by Russell S. Doughten

- Theatrical poster
- Directed by: Russell S. Doughten Jr.
- Written by: Robert Laning (screenplay); Henry Farrell (novel)
- Produced by: Russell S. Doughten Jr.
- Starring: Don O'Kelly; Harry Dean Stanton; John Carradine
- Cinematography: Ted V. Mikels
- Edited by: Gary Kurtz; Ron Honthaner
- Music by: Jaime Mendoza-Nava
- Production company: Heartland Productions
- Distributed by: Crown International Pictures
- Release date: October 23, 1966
- Running time: 84 minutes
- Country: United States
- Language: English

The Hostage is a 1966 Crown International low-budget motion picture starring Don O'Kelly, James Almanzar and Joanne Brown, with Leland Brown, John Carradine, and Harry Dean Stanton.

The film was directed by Russell S. Doughten Jr. It was adapted for the screen by Robert Laning, based on the 1959 novel The Hostage by Henry Farrell.

When it was made, Don O'Kelly was a TV actor. His career was cut short when he died shortly after making this movie. This was one of Harry Dean Stanton's earliest films.

== Plot ==
The plot centers on a young boy who becomes a hostage after he is accidentally closed inside a moving van.

== Production ==
The film was shot in Des Moines, Iowa.
