= Russell Doughten =

American filmmaker

- Born: February 16, 1927; Carlisle, Iowa
- Died: August 19, 2013 (aged 86); Carlisle, Iowa
- Education: Drake University, Yale University
- Occupations: Producer; director; writer
- Years active: 1958–1988

Russell S. Doughten Jr. (February 16, 1927 – August 19, 2013) was an American filmmaker and a producer of numerous short and feature-length films. His film work is credited under numerous variations of his name: with or without the "Jr." suffix or middle initial, and sometimes using the informal "Russ" instead of "Russell".

Doughten made both secular and Christian films. His work included the 1958 science fiction classic The Blob. He was best known for his four-part series A Thief in the Night. Nearly all of his Christian films were shot in various locales in his home state of Iowa. He has been referred to as being "the godfather of independent film in Iowa" and his body of work ranks him as the leading filmmaker in the state. He mentored many indie filmmakers in Iowa.

== Early life ==
Russell Doughten, Jr. was born February 16, 1927, while his parents were on the way to the hospital in Iowa Falls, Iowa. His father was a rural mail carrier. Although he grew up going to church, he said that he was baptized three times before he was "born again". After living in several small Iowa towns, Doughten graduated from Chester High School.

Immediately after Doughten reached enlistment age, he enlisted in the U.S. Navy. One of the places at which he was stationed was Naval Station Great Lakes in Illinois. He was honorably discharged in 1946.

Doughten was active in the Methodist church and served in youth ministry and boys' camps as a recreational director and swimming instructor. After his discharge from the Navy, Doughten attended Drake University on an athletic scholarship, but he became more interested in studying drama. After completing a fine arts degree at Drake in 1949, he began teaching English and drama in Williamsburg, Iowa in 1950.

Doughten and Gertrude Spraugue married on June 2, 1950, in Evanston, Illinois, while Doughten was performing summer stock theater in Chicago. They met while attending Drake. He left teaching high school in Iowa to study drama at Yale University in New Haven, Connecticut.

== Career ==
After completing graduate studies at Yale, while still living on the East Coast, he began working for Good News Productions in Pennsylvania as a producer, director, editor, and writer. There he learned from Irvin Yeaworth. With Good News, Doughten produced feature films, a children's gospel hour, and a Salvation Army recruiting film.

Good News Productions partnered with Jack H. Harris and Valley Forge Films to make the 1958 sci-fi classic The Blob. Doughten worked as associate producer on the film. In 1958, he returned to teaching English and drama, as well as supervising and directing student productions at South Pasadena High School. His former students report that he was exacting in demanding their best efforts, but they were proud of the results and the quality of the productions he directed.

=== Launch of Heartland Productions ===
In 1964, he resigned from teaching in California. Having become disillusioned with Hollywood, Doughten returned to Des Moines, initially planning to produce a film called Heartland about an Iowa farm family. He started his first production company, Heartland Productions, in 1965. He formed Heartland to make quality, low-budget films saying, "there are two ways of making movies these days, either expensive blockbusters or low-budget pictures. Since we obviously could not make Ben-Hur, the low-budgeters seemed the answer." Heartland concentrated on good stories rather than star-quality actors.

His first movie with Heartland, The Hostage (1966), was the first feature-length movie made entirely in Iowa. Doughten employed about 100 Iowans as either extras or in technical slots. The film premiered in Des Moines October 26, 1966. The film was distributed by Crown International Pictures.

Next, Doughten directed Fever Heat in 1968. He was also a producer and made the film under the Heartland label. A story about the excitement of stock car racing, Fever Heat is about a big-time driver who gets into small-town dirt track racing. The film was shot in Dexter, Iowa, using the Stuart Speedway. The production company converted a former boat factory in Dexter into a soundstage used for interior scenes in the film. Doughten had planned to film the entire picture in three weeks, but heavy rain right before filming started turned the dirt speedway to mud. He changed the film schedule to shoot interior scenes until races could resume on the dirt track. Forty Iowans from Des Moines were extras and also three local race drivers were in the movie. Fever Heat was distributed by Paramount Pictures.

Although Doughten eventually produced eight feature films through Heartland, the first two films lost money, forcing Doughten to take out a Small Business Administration (SBA) loan. The terms of the loan prohibited him from making movies, so the company shifted to acquiring and managing theaters.

=== A Thief in the Night ===
Seeing the decline in B movies, Doughten decided to shift his focus toward the Christian market, in part with the goal of using film for evangelistic purposes. In 1972, Doughten launched Mark IV Productions in partnership with co-founder Donald W. Thompson. They later produced 12 feature-length Christian films over a 12-year period, including the films that Doughten is best known for, the Thief In The Night series. The series dramatizes the Rapture and Tribulation and the struggles of a small band of believers against an increasingly hostile worldwide Antichrist dictatorship. The tetrad included A Thief in the Night (1972), A Distant Thunder (1978), Image of the Beast (1980), and The Prodigal Planet (1983).

Doughten appears in all four films as Reverend Matthew Turner, a survivalist who has an elaborate chart of the End Times events, but did not fully believe in the Bible until after the Rapture, even if not accepting Christ as his savior. With his long, graying hair usually worn in a ponytail and shaggy beard, he did not look the part of the stereotypical Christian fundamentalist, a fact that is credited with earning him secular fans, as is his use of unusual camera angles and layered audio.

While there had been feature-length Christian films before including the End Times film If Footmen Tire You, What Will Horses Do? directed by Ron Ormond in 1971, a sweeping, ambitious project like Thief—with three sequels telling one continuous story over the course of a decade—had never been undertaken even in Hollywood. Doughten identifies the Antichrist not with communism as Ormond had done, nor with Jack Chick's sinister view of the Vatican, but rather with a worldwide government which initially acts as a global peacemaker, i.e. the United Nations (UN). The UN as satanic enemy is a theme in other apocalyptic Christian media including the 1990s–2000s Left Behind series, Pat Robertson's 1991 New World Order, and Hal Lindsey's 1994 book Planet Earth 2000 A.D.: Will Mankind Survive?.

In 2012 it was estimated by Christianity Today that 300 million people had seen A Thief in the Night; Thompson claimed 4 million conversions to Christianity. Tim LaHaye and Jerry B. Jenkins cite A Thief in the Night as being the primary influence for their million-selling Left Behind series of books and films. Doughten's films have been frequently shown in churches and on Christian television stations.

== Later years ==
Doughten continued to produce films through Heartland Productions even during the time the Thief franchise was continuing. Some of his later credits through Heartland were Sammy (1977), Nite Song (1978), Whitcomb's War (1980), and Face in the Mirror (1988).

The volume of work Doughten produced through Heartland Productions, Mark IV Productions, and Russell Doughten Productions ranks him as the leading filmmaker from Iowa. In 2001, Doughten was awarded the Lifetime Achievement Award at the WYSIWYG Film Festival, and the National Religious Broadcasters Association presented him the Milestone Award for 50 years of achievement in presenting the gospel through film. Casting agent Kimberly Busbee referred to Doughten as "the godfather of independent film in Iowa." He was a regular attendee at Wild Rose Independent Film Festival in Des Moines and had mentored many indie filmmakers in Iowa.

Doughten died from a cardiac-related illness on August 19, 2013.

== Filmography ==
Year	Title	Notes
1958	The Blob	Associate producer
1960	Teenage Diary	Writer, director
1967	The Hostage	Producer, director
1968	Fever Heat	Producer, director
1972	A Thief in the Night	Executive producer, writer (story), actor
1974	Blood on the Mountain	Executive producer, writer (screenplay/story)
1975	Survival	Executive producer, writer (story)
1975	Happiness Is...	Producer, writer (screenplay), director
1976	A Stranger in My Forest	Executive producer, writer (screenplay)
1977	Ride the Wind	Producer, director
1977	Sammy	Producer, director
1977	All the King's Horses	Producer, writer
1978	A Distant Thunder	Executive producer, writer (screenplay/story), actor
1978	Nite Song	Producer, director
1979	Paradise Trail	Executive producer, writer (screenplay)
1980	Heaven's Heroes	Executive producer, writer (screenplay)
1980	Whitcomb's War	Producer, writer (story), director, actor
1980	Image of the Beast	Executive producer, writer (screenplay/story), actor
1981	Brother Enemy	Producer, director
1981	Home Safe	Writer
1982	Face in the Mirror	Producer, director
1982	Rock	
1983	The Healing	Producer, director
1983	The Prodigal Planet	Executive producer, writer (screenplay/story), actor
1983	Coach	
1984	The Shepherd	Executive producer, writer (original story)
1987	Test of Faith	
