= A Thief in the Night (film series) =

US film series directed by Donald W. Thompson

- Directed by: Donald W. Thompson
- Written by: Russell S. Doughten, Jr. Jim Grant; Donald W. Thompson
- Produced by: Donald W. Thompson
- Starring: Patty Dunning; Mike Niday; Colleen Niday; Maryann Rachford; Thom Rachford; Duane Coller; Russell S. Doughten, Jr. Clarence Balmer
- Cinematography: John P. Leiendecker, Jr.
- Edited by: Wes Phillippi
- Country: United States
- Language: English

A Thief in the Night is an evangelical Christian horror film series by Donald W. Thompson, Russell Doughten, and Jim Grant, about the rapture and the Tribulation. It consists of four films: A Thief in the Night (1972), A Distant Thunder (1978), Image of the Beast (1981), and The Prodigal Planet (1983). Three additional films were planned but never produced.

The series focuses on the difficulties of those who miss out on the rapture by having not trusted Jesus as savior and thus find themselves in the Tribulation. Interspersed throughout the four films are many presentations of the Christian gospel.

== Plot ==
Patty Myers is a young woman who considers herself a Christian because she occasionally reads her Bible and goes to a theologically liberal church regularly, although her pastor is actually an unbeliever. She refuses to believe the warnings of her friends and family that she will go through the Great Tribulation if she does not accept Jesus as her Savior. One morning she awakens to find that her husband – a born-again Christian – and millions of others have suddenly disappeared. Gradually, Patty realizes that the rapture has happened. The United Nations establishes an emergency government system called the United Nations Imperium of Total Emergency (UNITE), and those who do not receive the mark of the beast identifying them with UNITE are arrested. Patty is conflicted: she refuses to trust Jesus as her Savior, but also refuses to take the mark. She desperately tries to avoid the law and the mark but is captured by UNITE. She escapes but is cornered by UNITE on top of a dam and falls to her death.

Patty then awakens in bed and realizes that all she had experienced was only a dream. Her relief is short-lived when the radio announces that millions of people have disappeared. Horrified, Patty frantically searches for her husband only to find him missing too. Traumatized and distraught, Patty realizes that the rapture has indeed occurred and that she has been left behind.

A Distant Thunder tells Patty's story in a flashback which itself includes flashbacks. It begins with Patty awaiting her execution, and after Christians also awaiting execution ask her how she got there, she begins to tell her story and a flashback commences. It begins where the previous film left off, with Patty awakening from her dream to realize that the rapture has actually occurred. The film ends dramatically with Patty witnessing her friend Wenda being executed and arguing with Wenda's younger sister Sandy (who, along with Jerry and Diane, urges Patty to take the mark) who betrayed them—and being prepped for her own execution.

The third film, Image of the Beast, begins with Patty being forced by UNITE soldiers to decide to take the mark or to be publicly executed by guillotine. The soldiers strap her down to the guillotine, speechless and in shock, lying face-up. A sudden storm and earthquake occur, and the soldiers and others nearby run for safety, leaving Patty strapped to the guillotine. She cries, "I want the mark!", but nobody is nearby to hear or unstrap her. Alone, she attempts to unstrap herself, but the earthquake causes the hook holding up the guillotine blade to slip, and she dies.

The film then turns to a new story—that of David, Leslie, and Kathy. Leslie was with Patty at the guillotine, waiting her turn, when she escaped because of the earthquake. She runs, goes down into an underground room, and meets David there and falls in love with him. David's plan seems to be to develop a counterfeit mark so that a person can buy and sell without using the actual Beast's mark.

The fourth film, The Prodigal Planet, involves life after a nuclear war, in which mutants roam the Earth. David continues with his plan to destroy the master computer of the Beast by injecting a destructive code into it, which is in fact the hymn Onward, Christian Soldiers. The story is presented with action scenes interspersed with long conversations.

A fifth installment, The Battle of Armageddon, was planned even with a finished script, but never finished due to financial reasons as confirmed by actor Thom Rachford in an interview conducted by his grandson in 2023.

== Filming ==
Filming for A Thief in the Night and A Distant Thunder was largely done in and around Des Moines, Iowa, and surrounding areas. The rapture scene in A Thief in the Night (the missing letters from the marquee) was filmed at the First Church of the Open Bible, which is located at the corner of Hickman Road and Beaver Avenue in Des Moines. The climactic ending scene was filmed at the Red Rock Dam, which is located southeast of Des Moines. The UNITE center, along with the guillotine scenes, shown in A Distant Thunder, were filmed at the Providence Reformed Church and the Redeemer Lutheran Church, both located at the corner of University Avenue and 37th Street in Des Moines.

== Legacy ==
A Thief in the Night has been seen by an estimated 100 to 300 million people worldwide. It was a pioneer in the genre of Christian film, bringing rock music and elements of horror film to a genre then dominated by family-friendly evangelism. A quarter century later, the authors of the broadly successful Left Behind series of books and films acknowledged their debt to Thief. Indeed, even the title Left Behind echoes the refrain of Larry Norman's theme song for A Thief in the Night, "I Wish We'd All Been Ready," in which he sings, "There's no time to change your mind, the son has come and you've been left behind."

The series has been criticized by some Christians for its use of "scare tactics" in service of evangelism. Thompson defended his methods, saying, "The whole purpose is to scare them now if they’ve got to be scared, so they can make a decision before it’s too late."

Two Christian metal bands have used the film's news reports of the rapture event as intros to their songs. Barren Cross, The second track on the album, State of Control, "Out of Time" features the rapture newscast being played before the song begins. The first track on the Trytan album Sylentiger, "Take Cover" begins with a young man listening to a couple of news reports, one of which is from the movie, before receiving a phone call confirming the rapture.

== See also ==
- United Nations in popular culture
