= Timothy Beal =

American scholar

Timothy Beal is a writer and scholar in the field of religious studies whose work explores matters of religion, ecology, and technology. He is Distinguished University Professor, Florence Harkness Professor of Religion, and Director of h.lab at Case Western Reserve University in Cleveland, Ohio, USA. He has been Interim Dean of the university’s College of Arts and Sciences (2019), Chair of the Department of Religious Studies (2015–2021), and Director (2003–2007) and Associate Director (2002–2003) of the Baker-Nord Center for the Humanities.

== Biography ==
Beal was born in Hood River, Oregon, and was raised in Anchorage, Alaska. He went to college at Seattle Pacific University where he earned a B.A. in English in 1986. He earned a Master of Divinity at Columbia Theological Seminary in 1991, and a Ph.D. in Religion and Certificate in Women's and Gender Studies at Emory University in 1995. Before joining the faculty of Case Western Reserve University, he was an assistant professor of religious studies at Eckerd College in St. Petersburg, Florida (1994–1999). He has been visiting faculty at the Nida School for Translation Studies, the University of Denver, and the University of Glasgow. He is married to Clover Reuter Beal, a minister in the Presbyterian Church (USA). They have two grown children, Sophie and Seth.

Beal was named Distinguished University Professor in 2021. He received a Public Scholar Award from the National Endowment for the Humanities in 2016 and the Baker-Nord Center Award for Distinguished Scholarship in the Humanities in 2019.

== Books ==
- Religion and Its Monsters, Second Edition (Routledge, 2022)
- When Time Is Short: Finding Our Way in the Anthropocene (Beacon Press, 2022)
- An On-going Imagination: A Conversation about Scripture, Faith, and the Thickness of Relationship, by Walter Brueggemann and Clover Reuter Beal (edited by Timothy Beal; Louisville: Westminster John Knox, 2019)
- The Book of Revelation: A Biography (Princeton University Press, 2018)
- The Oxford Encyclopedia of the Bible and the Arts (Editor-in-Chief; Oxford University Press, 2015)
- The Rise and Fall of the Bible: The Unexpected History of an Accidental Book (Houghton Mifflin Harcourt, 2011)
- The Fate of King David: The Past and Present of a Biblical Icon (co-edited with Claudia Camp and Tod Linafelt; Festschrift for David M. Gunn; New York: Continuum, 2010)
- Biblical Literacy: The Essential Bible Stories Everyone Needs to Know (HarperOne, 2009)
- Religion in America: A Very Short Introduction (Oxford University Press, 2008)
- Mel Gibson’s Bible: Religion, Popular Culture, and The Passion of the Christ (co-edited with Tod Linafelt; University of Chicago Press, 2006)
- Roadside Religion: In Search of the Sacred, the Strange, and the Substance of Faith (Beacon, 2005)
- Theory for Religious Studies (co-authored with William E. Deal; Routledge, 2004)
- Religion and Its Monsters (Routledge, 2002)
- Esther (Liturgical Press, 1999)
- God in the Fray: Essays in Honor of Walter Brueggemann (co-edited with Tod Linafelt; Fortress, 1998)
- The Book of Hiding: Gender, Ethnicity, and Annihilation in Esther (Routledge, 1997)
- Reading Bibles, Writing Bodies: Identity and The Book (co-edited with David M. Gunn; Routledge, 1996)

== Other writings ==
In addition to scholarly articles, Beal has published essays on religion and culture for magazines and newspapers including The Wall Street Journal, Harper's Magazine, The New York Times, The Chronicle of Higher Education, The Washington Post, and The Cleveland Plain Dealer. He has been featured on radio shows including NPR's All Things Considered and The Bob Edwards Show.
