= Don O'Kelly =

American actor (1924-1966)

- Born: March 17, 1924
- Died: October 2, 1966 (aged 42)

Don O'Kelly (né Donald Patrick Kelly; March 17, 1924 – October 2, 1966) was an American actor prominent in the 1950s and 1960s mostly on television. Though credited as "Don Kelly" in earlier performances, his billing was changed to "Don O'Kelly" in 1960.

== Background ==
Donald Patrick Kelly was born in the Sheepshead Bay neighborhood of Brooklyn, New York to Robert Kelly, an Irish-American father (Robert J. Kelly) and Norwegian-American mother (Rachel Marie Knudsen).

Kelly enlisted in the United States Navy on June 17, 1941 just prior to World War II and saw active duty aboard the USS Stanton and USS Palmer. He saw convoy duty at San Juan, Puerto Rico, Iceland, England, Scotland, North Africa, and Italy. He served four years, three months, and 17 days of active duty. Kelly received an honorable discharge after the war and upon separation joined his cousin's ice skating show. O'Kelly used his GI Bill of Rights to study acting with the Strasberg company in Hollywood, California.

== Career ==
Don O'Kelly began his career starring in Tank Battalion with Marjorie Hellen (later Leslie Parrish). O'Kelly was a familiar face to series television fans during the 1950s and 1960s. His last starring role was in The Hostage, made in 1966 and released in 1967, for which he received very favorable reviews.

== TV and film credits ==
- The Hostage (1967) ... Bull
- Shoot Out at Big Sag (1962) ... Fargo
- Frontier Uprising (1961) ... Kilpatrick
- Tank Battalion (1958) ... Sgt Brad Dunne aka Korean Attack
- The Notorious Mr. Monks (1958) ... Dan Flynn
- Bombers B-52 (1957) ... Master Sergeant Darren McKind aka No Sleep Till Dawn (UK)
- The Crooked Circle (1957) ... Joe Kelly
- The Big Land (1957)... Billy Tyler aka Stampeded (UK)
- The Wild Wild West (1965) episode The Night of a Thousand Eyes ... Peavey
- Gunsmoke (1965) episode Eliab's Aim ... Dealer
- Ben Casey (1964) episode One Nation Indivisible ... George Zybsko
- Bonanza (1964) episode The Lila Conrad Story
- The Virginian (1963) episode The Evil That Men Do ... Deke
- The Dakotas (1963) episode Fargo ... Paul Young
- The Gallant Men (1963)episode The Leathernecks ... Captain Barlow
- 77 Sunset Strip (1963) episode Crashout ... Arnie Martin
- The Gallant Men (1962) episode One Moderately Peaceful Sunday
- 77 Sunset Strip (1962) episode Terror in a Small Town ... Sheriff Farger
- The Beachcomber (1962) episode The Fugitive ... Womack
- Ripcord (1961) episode High Jeopardy ... Johnny Grimes
- 77 Sunset Strip (1961) episode The Turning Point ... Nate Minton
- Bat Masterson (1961) episode Meeting at Mimbers ... Green River Tom Smith
- Riverboat (1960) episode Zigzag ... Clyde
- Bat Masterson (1960) episode The Elusive Baguette as “Reed Morgan”
- The Deputy (1960) episode Lady for a Hanging ... Hunter
- Bat Masterson (1960) episode The Last of the Night Raiders ... Jack Doolin
- Tombstone Territory" (1960) episode Girl From Philadelphia" ... as outlaw Ben Quade
- The Twilight Zone (1960) episode The Mighty Casey ... Monk
- Overland Trail (1960) episode Fire in the Hole ... Red
- 77 Sunset Strip (1960) episode Vacation with Pay ... Adams
- Bourbon Street Beat (1960) episode Neon Nightmare ... George Johnson
- Lawman (1960) episode The Truce
- M Squad (1960) episode Race to Death ... Joe Calhoun
- Laramie (1960) episode Duel at Alta Mesa
- The Alaskans (1960) episode The Trial of Reno McKee ... Carl
- The Alaskans (1960) episode Black Sand
- Have Gun – Will Travel (1960) episode The Day of the Bad Man ... Amos Saint
- Bonanza (1960) episode El Toro Grande
- The Restless Gun (1959) episode A Very Special Inspector ... Blair Weeks
- Tales of Wells Fargo (1959) episode The Daltons ...Bob Dalton
- Black Saddle (1959) episode Client: Reynolds ... Harry Briggs
- Lawman (1959) episode The Souvenir ... Virgil Carey
- Disneyland (6 March 1959) episode The Slaughter Trail ... Jed
- Texas John Slaughter (1959) episode (#1.5) The Slaughter Trail ... Jed
- Disneyland (20 March 1959) episode Man from Bitter Creek ... Jed
- Texas John Slaughter" (1959) (#1.6) Man from Bitter Creek" ... Jed
- Sugarfoot (1959) episode The Giant Killer ... Tracy
- The Texan (1959) episode A Quart of Law
- Maverick (1958) episode Holiday at Hollow Rock ... Ira Swain
- 77 Sunset Strip (1958) episode The Court Martial of Johnny Murdo ... Sergeant Bannock
- Lawman (1958) episode The Oath ... Lou Menke
- Broken Arrow (1958) episode War Trail ... Captain Baker
- Have Gun – Will Travel (1958) episode The Teacher ... Coley
- Maverick (1958) episode Trail West to Fury ... Jett
- Wire Service (1957) episode Misfire
- Frontier (1956) episode A Somewhere Voice ... Jim
- Death Valley Days (1956) episode The Sinbuster
- Frontier (1956) episode The Well ... Jim
