= Jehovah's Witnesses in Sweden =

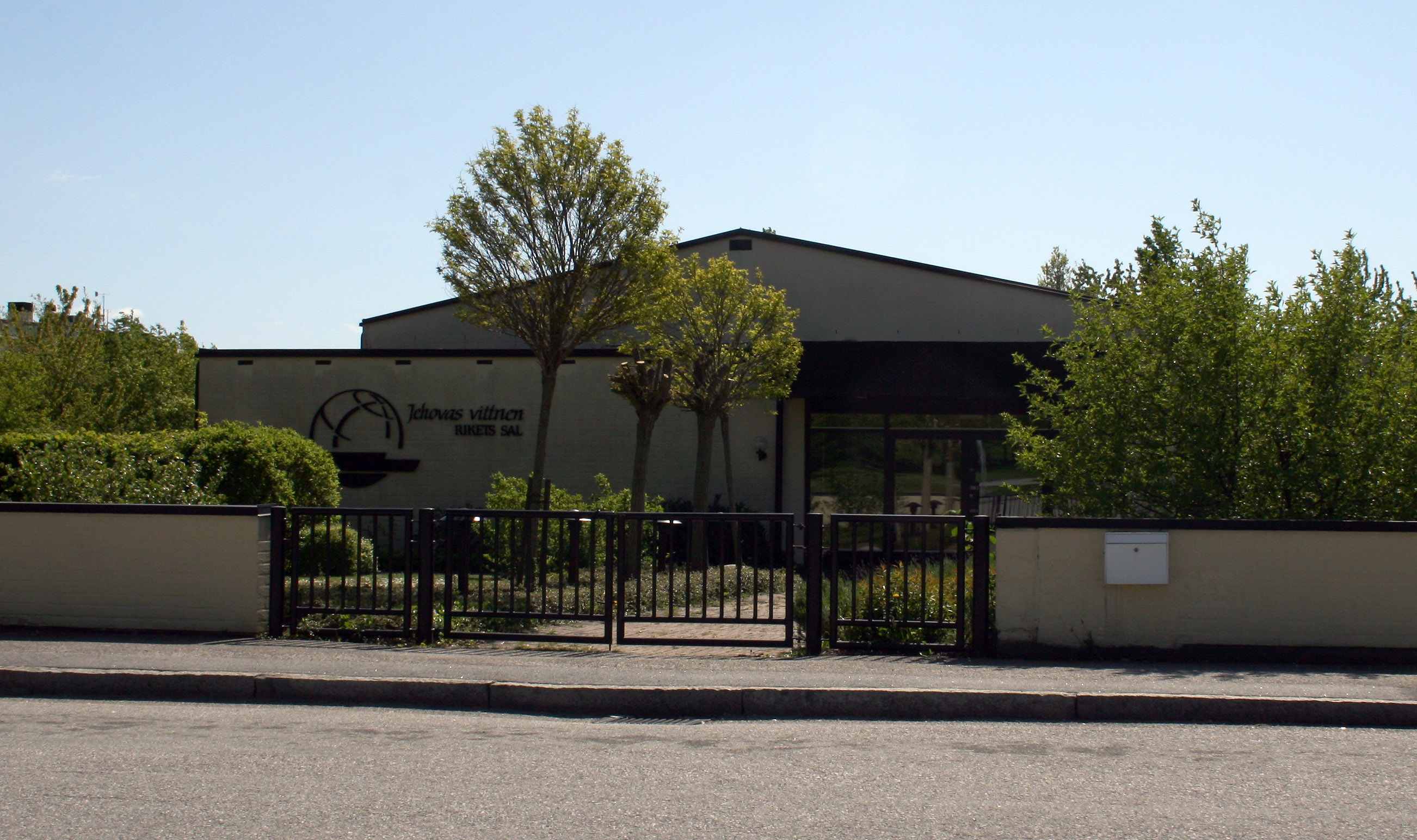
- The Kingdom Hall in Lund
- Classification: Nontrinitarian Restorationism
- Orientation: Jehovah's Witnesses
- talesman (Speaker): Georg Svensson
- Headquarters: Denmark
- Origin: 1899 or 1909
- Members: 23,000 (1992)
- Publications: Vakttornet

The Jehovah's Witnesses in Sweden (Swedish: Jehovas vittnen i Sverige) is a branch of the international Jehovah's Witnesses organization, which is directed by the Governing Body of Jehovah's Witnesses in New York. The organization has been active in Sweden since 1909, or 1899. The Swedish branch had 23 thousand members in 1992, of which roughly one-tenth were immigrants; immigrant members often conducted religious activities in other languages.

The Swedish branch maintained its headquarters in Arboga, before it moved to its new Scandinavian headquarters in Holbaek, Denmark, in 2012.

== Criticism ==
The Swedish government and civil authorities have criticized Jehovah's Witnesses for their pacifism and refusal to become involved in military struggles. Conflicts were particularly severe during World War II.

Swedish Jehovah's Witnesses have also been criticized for allegedly not following the Convention on the Rights of the Child.
