= U.N. Me =

- theatrical release poster
- Directed by: Ami Horowitz; Matthew Groff
- Produced by: Ami Horowitz; Matthew Groff
- Cinematography: Bob Richman; Wolfgang Held
- Production company: Disruptive Pictures
- Distributed by: Samuel Goldwyn Films
- Release date: November 2009
- Running time: 90 minutes
- Country: United States
- Language: English

U.N. Me is a documentary film about the United Nations by first-time filmmakers Ami Horowitz and Matthew Groff. It premiered at the International Documentary Film Festival Amsterdam in November 2009.

The documentary – or "docutainment" according to Horowitz – which began production in 2006, is a critique that depicts the United Nations as an organization that has drifted from its founding principles to the point where it now "enables evil and sows global chaos." The film follows Horowitz and Groff as they travel and look to expose the numerous scandals and cases of abuse of the U.N. Through interviews with involved parties and archived footage, they provide a look into events such as a shooting that has gone forgotten, where UN soldiers opened fire on unarmed protestors and the “Oil-for-Food” program. Also featured is evidence of the use of UN funds and equipment to support terrorist activity through complacency or complicity, including video footage of insurgents loading assault rifles and RPGs into a UN vehicle to make an escape.

Some scenes of U.N. Me were shot inside the headquarters of the United Nations in New York City.

== Background ==
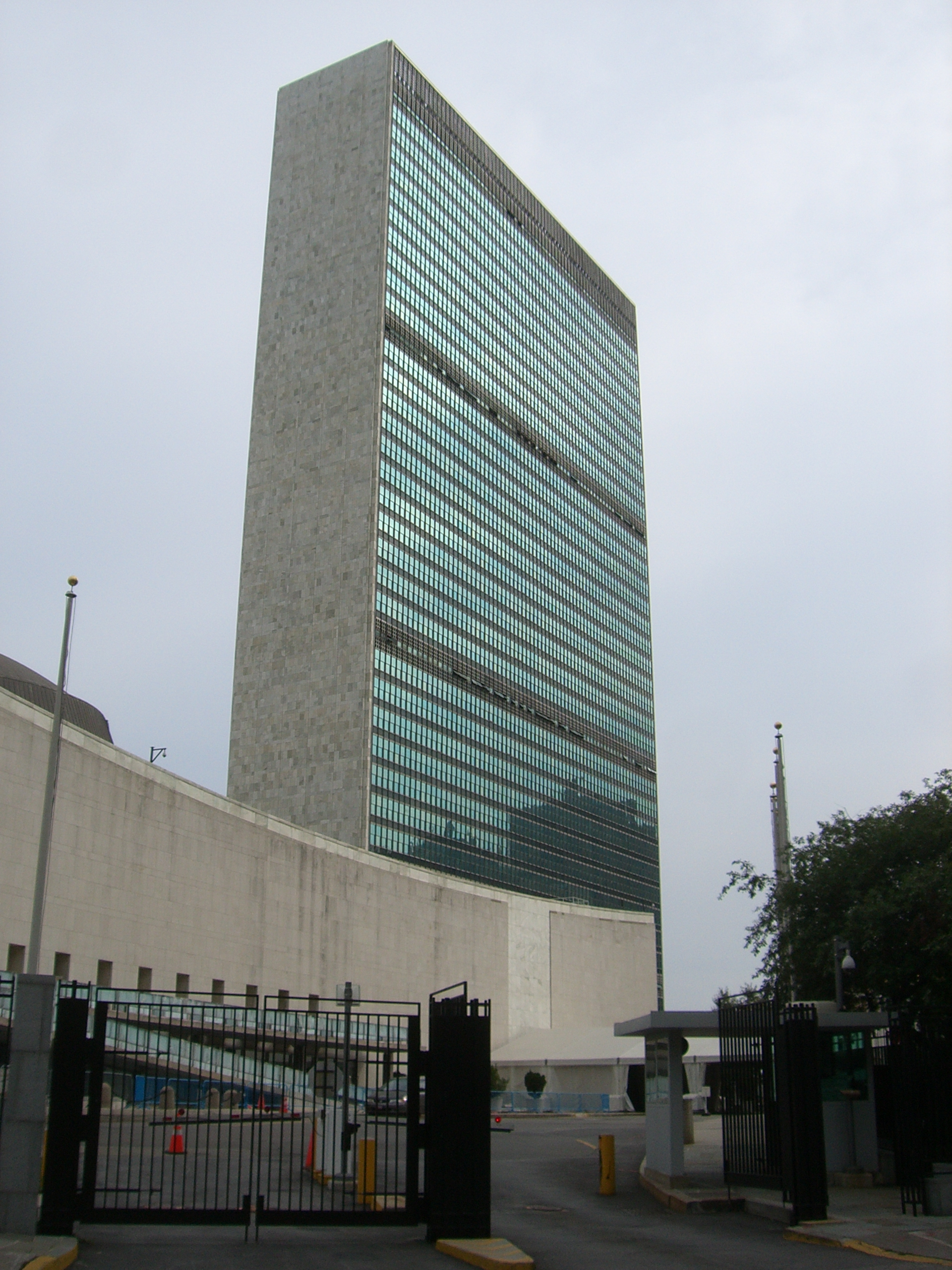
Some scenes were filmed inside the headquarters of the United Nations in New York City

Horowitz is a former investment banker who has written for the National Review and the Weekly Standard; Matthew Groff has been a post-production supervisor and assistant producer.

Horowitz cites the idea for the film coming from being upset with the unrest in Rwanda and the lack of involvement from the United Nations. Horowitz told Brian Lamb on C-SPAN that “within two weeks” of seeing Moore's film, “I had quit my job [at Lehman Brothers] and started raising money to make the [movie].”

In addition to admiring Michael Moore's documentary style, Horowitz has confessed to being influenced by Sacha Baron Cohen's interviewing technique, and has said that he "was so enamored with" both Moore's and Baron Cohen's approaches to filmmaking that he "hired much of their teams." Writers from The Daily Show, The Onion, and from Michael Moore's films contributed to the documentary.

== Views ==
Horowitz has said that some people at the UN “actively want to move the world in a bad direction” while others "move around in a moral fog". As an example of UN bureaucrats' “foggy moral vision” he cites Kofi Annan's comment, apropos of Rwanda, that “the UN must stay impartial even in the face of genocide.”

In another segment, about the organization's failure to stop the killings in Darfur, Horowitz asks Sudan’s UN ambassador why his country stones gays after one sexual act but lesbians after four. “'No, no, no,' the ambassador corrects him. 'Woman, if she is married, she will be stoned immediately.'”

== Reception ==
The film had a limited U.S. release in June 2012, to mixed reviews. Owing to its limited release, the film was unable to recoup its $4 million budget at the box office.

Neil Genzlinger of The New York Times called U.N. Me "a sassy documentary that suggests the United Nations is doing more harm than good", saying "Mr. Horowitz, the on-camera gadfly, finds ways to work wit into decidedly unpleasant subject matter."

The New York Daily News described U.N. Me as a "Michael Moore-style exposé of the United Nations" and singled out a scene in which co-director Horowitz wandered through the halls of the UN building "searching for someone actually working at their desk". Some critics, however, were not entirely impressed by Horowitz's attempts to emulate Michael Moore's style: "Covering a lot of ground in colorful, pacey fashion, the docu is nonetheless somewhat compromised itself by co-director Ami Horowitz's insistence on playing the Michael Moore/Morgan Spurlock role of onscreen provocateur...These japes only do a disservice to the film's many serious allegations."

Brian Brooks, the editor of IndieWire, said "I have to say, this is one of those rare moments when a film seriously has challenged my personal view" and called the movie "funny and engaging". Matthew Lee was shocked to see that Horowitz was able to enter the Security Council. Horowitz has noted that while both conservatives and liberals in the U.S. responded enthusiastically to the film, “Europeans generally are particularly hostile to the movie” because they are put off by “the idea of a moral high ground” and consider “preaching against a particular ideology, for instance radical Islam, is dubious, possibly even racist.”

== Awards and honors ==
U.N. Me won the "Best Documentary" award at the 2010 New Hampshire Film Festival.
