= Heather Hendershot =

American historian

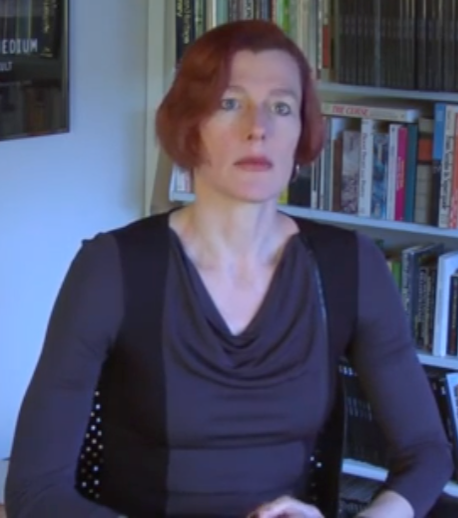
- In an MIT video in 2015
- Born: Birmingham, Alabama
- Occupation: Historian
- Awards: Guggenheim Fellowship (2009)

Academic background
- Education: Yale University; University of Rochester
- Thesis: Endangering the dangerous: the regulation and censorship of children's television programming, 1968-1990 (1995)

Academic work
- Discipline: History
- Sub-discipline: Television studies; American film
- Institutions: Queens College; Massachusetts Institute of Technology; Northwestern University

Heather Hendershot is an American historian. A 2009 Guggenheim Fellow, she has written several books on television studies – Saturday Morning Censors (1998), Shaking the World for Jesus (2004), What's Fair on the Air? (2011), Open to Debate (2016), and When the News Broke (2022) – and edited one volume: Nickelodeon Nation (2004). She is Cardiss Collins Professor of Communication Studies and Journalism at the Northwestern University School of Communication, and she has previously served as the editor of Journal of Cinema and Media Studies.

== Biography ==
Hendershot grew up in Birmingham, Alabama, to a Quaker family. Hendershot has described her upbringing as shaping her views on gender.

Hendershot attended Yale University, where she obtained her BA in French and Film Studies, and was part of Berkeley College. She later did her graduate studies at the University of Rochester, where she obtained an MA and PhD, both in English and part of the film program. Her doctoral dissertation was titled Endangering the dangerous: the regulation and censorship of children's television programming, 1968-1990. In 1998, she published her first book, Saturday Morning Censors, based on her doctoral thesis.

Hendershot originally worked at Queens College as an associate professor within the Department of Media Studies, as well as at CUNY Graduate Center's Film Studies Certificate Program, where she was coordinator. She was Wolf Visiting Professor of Television Studies at University of Pennsylvania in late-2009. Following her time at Queens College, she became a professor of film and media at the Massachusetts Institute of Technology. She later moved to the Northwestern University School of Communication, where she held a full professorship. In 2025, she was appointed Cardiss Collins Professor of Communication Studies and Journalism.

Hendershot specializes in television studies, as well as mid-20th-century Hollywood cinema. She released two books in 2004: an edited volume about the cable channel Nickelodeon titled Nickelodeon Nation and a monograph about evangelical Christianity product marketing called Shaking the World for Jesus. In 2009, Hendershot was awarded a Guggenheim Fellowship. She later published two more monographs: What’s Fair on the Air? (2011), centered on the era of Cold War right-wing broadcasters Billy James Hargis, H. L. Hunt, Carl McIntire, and Dan Smoot; and Open to Debate (2016), centered on the conservative talk show Firing Line. She served as the editor of Journal of Cinema and Media Studies for five years.

In 2022, Hendershot released When the News Broke, a book on the impact of the 1968 Democratic National Convention on accusations of media bias in the United States, it was shortlisted for the Newberry Library's 2023 Pattis Family Foundation Chicago Book Award.

== Bibliography ==
- Saturday Morning Censors: Television Regulation before the V-Chip. Duke University Press, 1998.
- (ed.) Nickelodeon Nation: The History, Politics, and Economics of America's Only TV Channel for Kids. New York University Press, 2004.
- Shaking the World for Jesus: Media and Conservative Evangelical Culture. University of Chicago Press, 2004.
- What's Fair on the Air?: Cold War Right-Wing Broadcasting and the Public Interest. University of Chicago Press, 2011.
- Open to Debate: How William F. Buckley Put Liberal America on the Firing Line. Broadside Books, 2016.
- When the News Broke: Chicago 1968 and the Polarizing of America. University of Chicago Press, 2022.
